= George Grenville (disambiguation) =

George Grenville (1712–1770) was Prime Minister of Great Britain.

George Grenville may also refer to:

- George Grenville (died 1595), MP for Launceston, Camelford, Weymouth and Melcombe Regis
- George Grenville (fl. 1571–1572), MP for Launceston

== See also ==
- George Nugent-Grenville, 2nd Baron Nugent (1789–1850), British politician
- George Nugent-Temple-Grenville, 1st Marquess of Buckingham (1753–1813)
