= James Deakin =

James Deakin may refer to:

- James Deakin (journalist) (1929–2007), American journalist and TV host
- James Henry Deakin (politician, born 1823) (1823–1880), Manchester merchant, briefly Member of Parliament for Launceston
- James Henry Deakin (politician, born 1851) (1851–1881), son of the above, who replaced him as Member for Launceston
- James Deakin (host, born 1972), Filipino-British television host
- Seamus Deakin (James Aubrey Deakin, 1874–1952), president of the Irish Republican Brotherhood

== See also ==
- James Deakins, fictional character in Law & Order: Criminal Intent
