= John Greville =

John Greville may refer to:

- John Greville (died 1444), English Member of Parliament
- John Greville (died 1480) (1427–1480), son of John Greville (died 1444)
- John Greville (died 1547) (by 1492–1547), English Member of Parliament

== See also ==
- John Grenville (disambiguation)
