= 1898 Launceston by-election =

UK Parliamentary by-election

The 1898 Launceston by-election was held on 3 August 1898. It was held due to the death of the incumbent Liberal MP Thomas Owen. It was retained by the Liberal candidate Sir John Fletcher Moulton.

Launceston by-election, 1898
Party	Candidate	Votes	%	±%
Liberal	John Fletcher Moulton	3,951	58.0	+3.0
Liberal Unionist	Sir Frederick Wills	2,863	42.0	−3.0
Majority		1,088	16.0	+6.0
Turnout		6,814	71.7	+1.6
Liberal hold		Swing	+3.0	
