= 1874 Launceston by-election =

UK Parliamentary by-election

The 1874 Launceston by-election was fought on 3 July 1874. The byelection was fought due to the void Election of the incumbent Conservative MP, James Henry Deakin (senior). It was won by his son, the Conservative candidate James Henry Deakin (junior).

1874 Launceston by-election
Party	Candidate	Votes	%	±%
Conservative	James Henry Deakin (junior)	417	64.1	−3.6
Liberal	John Dingley	233	35.8	+3.5
Conservative	Hardinge Giffard	1	0.2	N/A
Majority		184	28.3	−7.1
Turnout		651	82.4	−2.3
Registered electors		790		
Conservative hold		Swing	-3.5	
