= Cokeworthy =

Cokeworthy is a surname. Notable people with the surname include:

- John Cokeworthy (disambiguation), multiple people
- Ralph Cokeworthy, MP for Liskeard (UK Parliament constituency)
