= Lord Percy =

Lord Percy is the name of:

- Baron Percy created firstly in 1066, a title associated though not exclusively with the Earls of Northumberland and their predecessors
- Earl Percy, a subsidiary title of the Duke of Northumberland used as a courtesy by the Duke's heir
- Eustace Percy, 1st Baron Percy of Newcastle (1887–1958), British diplomat
- Hugh Percy, 2nd Duke of Northumberland (1742-1817), British general during the American Revolutionary War.
- Lord Percy Percy, fictional character in the British comedy series, Blackadder
- Lord Henry Percy (1817–1877), VC KCB (22 August 1817 – 3 December 1877) was an English recipient of the Victoria Cross, the highest and most prestigious award for gallantry in the face of the enemy that can be awarded to British and Commonwealth forces
- Lord Josceline Percy (1811–1881)
- Lord Algernon Percy (1851–1933), British career soldier and Conservative politician who sat in the House of Commons from 1882 to 1887
- Lord Percy Seymour
