= Josceline Percy =

Josceline Percy may refer to:

- Josceline Percy, 11th Earl of Northumberland (1644–1670), peer who supported the Parliamentary cause in the English Civil War
- Josceline Percy (Royal Navy officer) (1784–1856), Royal Navy admiral and a Member of Parliament
- Lord Josceline Percy (1811–1881), British Conservative politician
