= George Seymour (Royal Navy officer) =

Royal Navy Admiral (1787–1870)

Admiral of the Fleet The Right Honourable Sir George Seymour GCB GCH
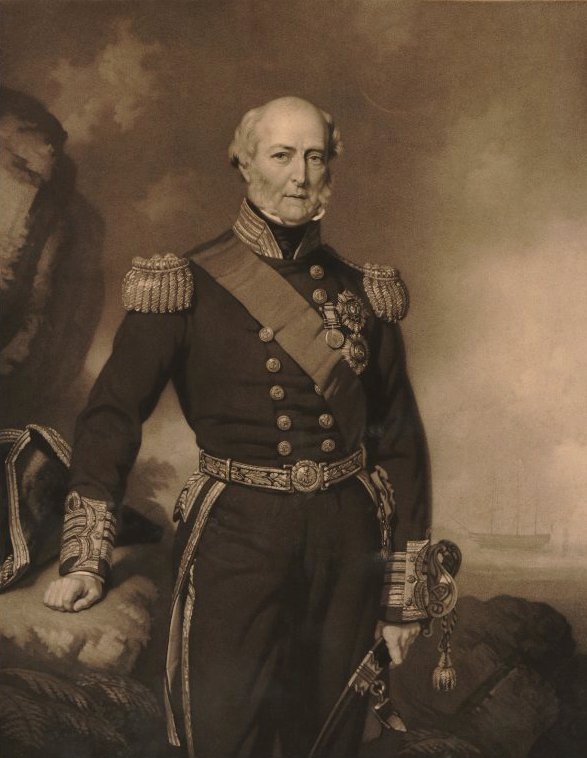
- Sir George Francis Seymour
- Born: 17 September 1787; Berkeley, Gloucestershire
- Died: 20 January 1870 (aged 82); Eaton Square, London
- Burial place: Holy Trinity Church, Arrow, Warwickshire
- Children: 7, including Francis, Henry, William, and Laura
- Military career
- Allegiance: United Kingdom
- Branch: Royal Navy
- Service years: 1797–1868
- Rank: Admiral of the Fleet
- Commands: Portsmouth Command (1856–1859); North America and West Indies Station (1851–1853); Pacific Station (1844–1847); HMS Briton; HMS Leonidas; HMS Fortunée; HMS Manilla; HMS Pallas; HMS Aurore; HMS Kingfisher; HMS Northumberland
- Conflicts: French Revolutionary Wars; Napoleonic Wars; War of 1812
- Awards: Knight Grand Cross of the Order of the Bath; Knight Grand Cross of the Royal Guelphic Order

Admiral of the Fleet Sir George Francis Seymour, GCB, GCH, PC (17 September 1787 – 20 January 1870) was a Royal Navy officer. After serving as a junior officer during the French Revolutionary Wars, Seymour commanded the third-rate HMS Northumberland under Admiral Sir John Duckworth at the Battle of San Domingo during the Napoleonic Wars. He also commanded the sloop HMS Kingfisher at the blockade of Rochefort and the fifth-rate HMS Pallas under Admiral Lord Gambier at the Battle of the Basque Roads. He then saw active service during the War of 1812.

Seymour became Third Naval Lord in the Second Peel ministry and went on to be Commander-in-Chief Pacific Station. In late 1844 the French Admiral Abel Aubert du Petit-Thouars entered into a confrontation with Queen Pōmare IV of Tahiti and with the English missionary and consul George Pritchard, expelling the consul and establishing a French protectorate over the territory during the Franco-Tahitian War. This matter became known as the "Pritchard Affair". Seymour handled this matter tactfully and avoided a confrontation with the French Government, which had already denounced Thouars' actions. Seymour later served as Commander-in-Chief North America and West Indies Station and then as Commander-in-Chief, Portsmouth.

== Early career ==
Seymour was the eldest son of Vice-Admiral Lord Hugh Seymour and Anna Horatia Waldegrave (a daughter of James Waldegrave, 2nd Earl Waldegrave) and joined the Royal Navy in October 1797. He was assigned to the Royal yacht HMY Princess Augusta and then transferred to the third-rate HMS Sans Pareil in the Channel Squadron in March 1798 and to the second-rate HMS Prince of Wales in the West Indies later that year. He was present when the Batavian Republic surrendered Suriname to British forces in August 1799 during the French Revolutionary Wars and, having been promoted to midshipman, transferred to the fifth-rate HMS Acasta early in 1800. He joined the fifth-rate HMS Endymion in 1802 and then transferred to the first-rate HMS Victory, flagship of the Mediterranean Squadron, in 1803, to the fourth-rate HMS Madras in February 1804 and, having been promoted to lieutenant on 12 October 1804, to the third-rate HMS Donegal later that month. In HMS Donegal he took part in the pursuit of the French Fleet, under the command of Admiral Pierre-Charles Villeneuve, to the West Indies and back in Summer 1805 during the Napoleonic Wars before seeing action at the capture of the Spanish 100-gun Rayo in October 1805.

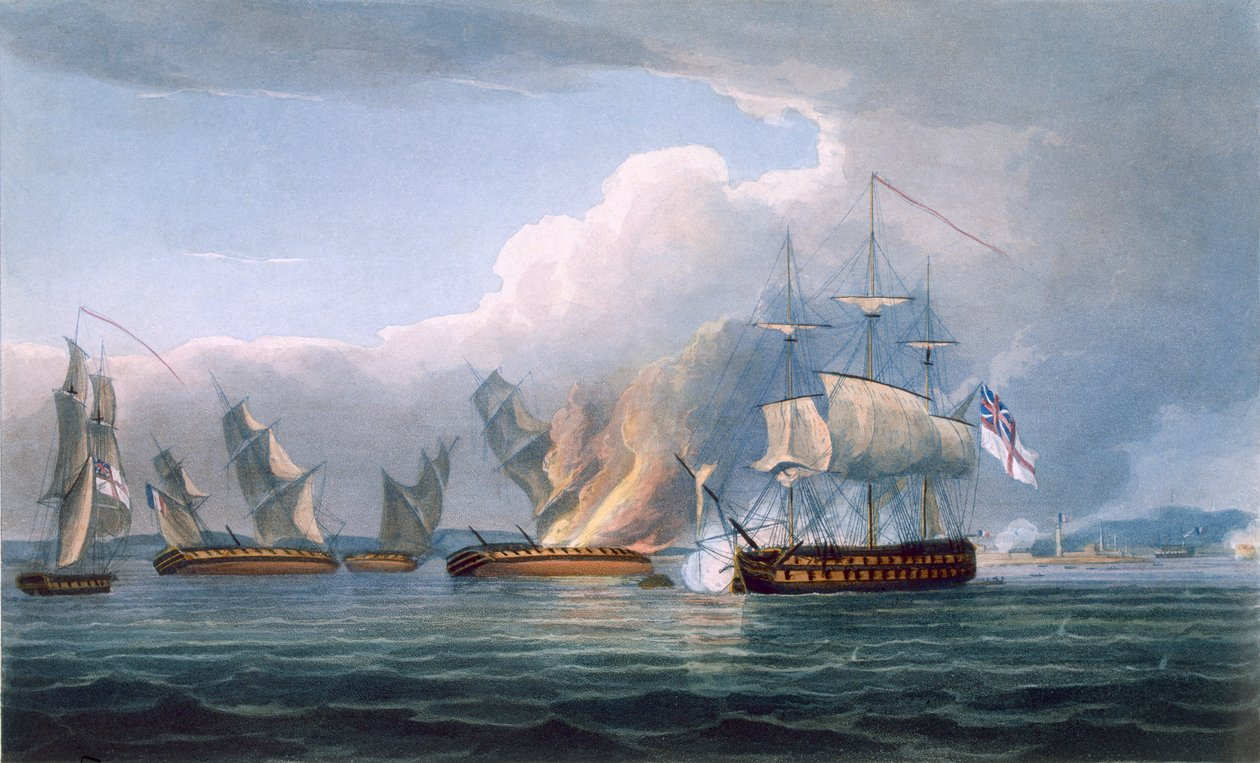
The third-rate HMS Northumberland (right), which Seymour commanded in the West Indies

Promoted to commander on 23 January 1806, Seymour became commanding officer of the third-rate HMS Northumberland, flagship of the West Indies Squadron, in January 1806 and fought under Admiral Sir John Duckworth at the Battle of San Domingo where he was wounded off the southern coast of the French-occupied Spanish colony San Domingo in the Caribbean Sea in February 1806. He went on to be commanding officer of the sloop HMS Kingfisher and took part in the blockade of Rochefort. He became commanding officer of the sloop HMS Aurora in the Mediterranean Squadron in June 1806 and, having been promoted to captain on 29 July 1806, he was given command of the fifth-rate HMS Pallas in February 1808. In HMS Pallas he fought under Admiral Lord Gambier at the Battle of the Basque Roads in April 1809. In the summer of 1809 he was called as a witness at the Court-martial of James, Lord Gambier which assessed whether Gambier had failed to support Captain Lord Cochrane at the battle. Gambier was controversially cleared of all charges. He went on to be commanding officer of the fifth-rate HMS Manilla in September 1809.

Seymour became commanding officer of the fifth-rate HMS Fortunée in June 1812 and of the fifth-rate HMS Leonidas in January 1813 during the War of 1812. In HMS Leonidas he captured the privateer USS Paul Jones in May 1813. He was appointed a Companion of the Order of the Bath on 4 June 1815. He became Serjeant-at-Arms to the House of Lords in 1818 and was given a short leave of absence to undertake a tour as commanding officer of the fifth-rate HMS Briton on "particular service" in 1827. He was appointed a Knight Commander of the Royal Guelphic Order in 1831, awarded a British knighthood on 23 March 1831 and advanced to Knight Grand Cross of the Royal Guelphic Order on 9 December 1834. In June 1837 he attended the funeral of King William IV, Seymour's last act as Master of the Robes to the King.

== Senior command ==
Seymour was appointed Third Naval Lord in the Second Peel ministry in September 1841. Promoted to rear admiral on 23 November 1841, he became Commander-in-Chief Pacific Station, with his flag in the third-rate HMS Collingwood, in May 1844. Later that year the French Admiral Abel Aubert du Petit-Thouars entered into a confrontation with Queen Pōmare IV of Tahiti and with the English missionary and consul George Pritchard, expelling the consul and establishing a French protectorate over the territory in the Franco-Tahitian War. The expulsion of the consul became known as the "Pritchard Affair", a business which Seymour handled tactfully avoiding a confrontation with the French Government who had already denounced Thouars' actions. Tensions with United States were high as a result of the Oregon boundary dispute and Seymour avoided inflaming this situation in discussions over fisheries.

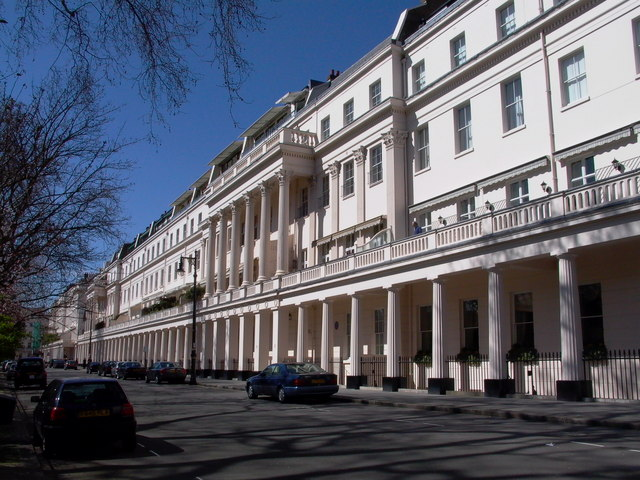
Eaton Square in London: Seymour lived at No. 115

Promoted to vice-admiral on 27 March 1850, Seymour became Commander-in-Chief North America and West Indies Station, with his flag in the third-rate HMS Cumberland, in January 1851. He was advanced to Knight Commander of the Order of the Bath on 6 April 1852 and became Commander-in-Chief, Portsmouth, with his flag in the first-rate HMS Victory in 1856. Promoted to full admiral on 14 May 1857 and advanced to Knight Grand Cross of the Order of the Bath on 18 May 1860, he was appointed Rear-Admiral of the United Kingdom on 16 May 1863 and Vice-Admiral of the United Kingdom on 23 September 1865. Promoted to Admiral of the Fleet on 20 November 1866, he died of bronchitis at his home at Eaton Square in London on 20 January 1870. Seymour's body was placed in a tomb, on which rests a recumbent marble sculpture of him by Victor Gleichen, at Holy Trinity Church in Arrow, not far from the Seymour family seat at Ragley Hall in Warwickshire.

== Family ==
In March 1811 Seymour married Georgiana Mary Berkeley (a daughter of Sir George Berkeley) and they had three sons:

- Francis Seymour, 5th Marquess of Hertford
- Vice-Admiral Henry Seymour
- General Lord William Seymour

and four daughters including:

- Laura Williamina Seymour, a Princess by marriage with a nephew of Queen Victoria

== Recognition ==
Seymour Narrows in British Columbia, where he commanded the Pacific Station from 1844 to 1848, is named for Seymour.

== Sources ==
- Heathcote, Tony (2002). The British Admirals of the Fleet 1734 – 1995. Pen & Sword. ISBN 0-85052-835-6.
- O'Brien, Patricia (April 2006). Think of Me as a Woman: Queen Pomare of Tahiti and Anglo-French Imperial Contest in the 1840s Pacific. Gender and History, Vol. 18 No. 1. Archived from the original on 22 February 2015.

Court offices
| Preceded by Sir Charles Morice Pole, Bt | Master of the Robes; 1830–1837 | Last permanent holder |
Military offices
| Preceded by Sir Samuel Pechell, Bt | Third Naval Lord; 1841–1844 | Succeeded by William Bowles |
| Preceded by Richard Thomas | Commander-in-Chief, Pacific Station; 1844–1847 | Succeeded by Phipps Hornby |
| Preceded by The Earl of Dundonald | Commander-in-Chief, North America and West Indies Station; 1851–1853 | Succeeded by Arthur Fanshawe |
| Preceded by Sir Thomas Cochrane | Commander-in-Chief, Portsmouth; 1856–1859 | Succeeded by William Bowles |
Honorary titles
| Preceded by Sir William Parker | Rear-Admiral of the United Kingdom; 1863–1865 | Succeeded by Sir William Bowles |
| Preceded by Sir Thomas Cochrane | Vice-Admiral of the United Kingdom; 1865–1866 | Succeeded by Sir William Bowles |
