= Earl of Halsbury =

Title in the Peerage of the United Kingdom

Earldom of Halsbury
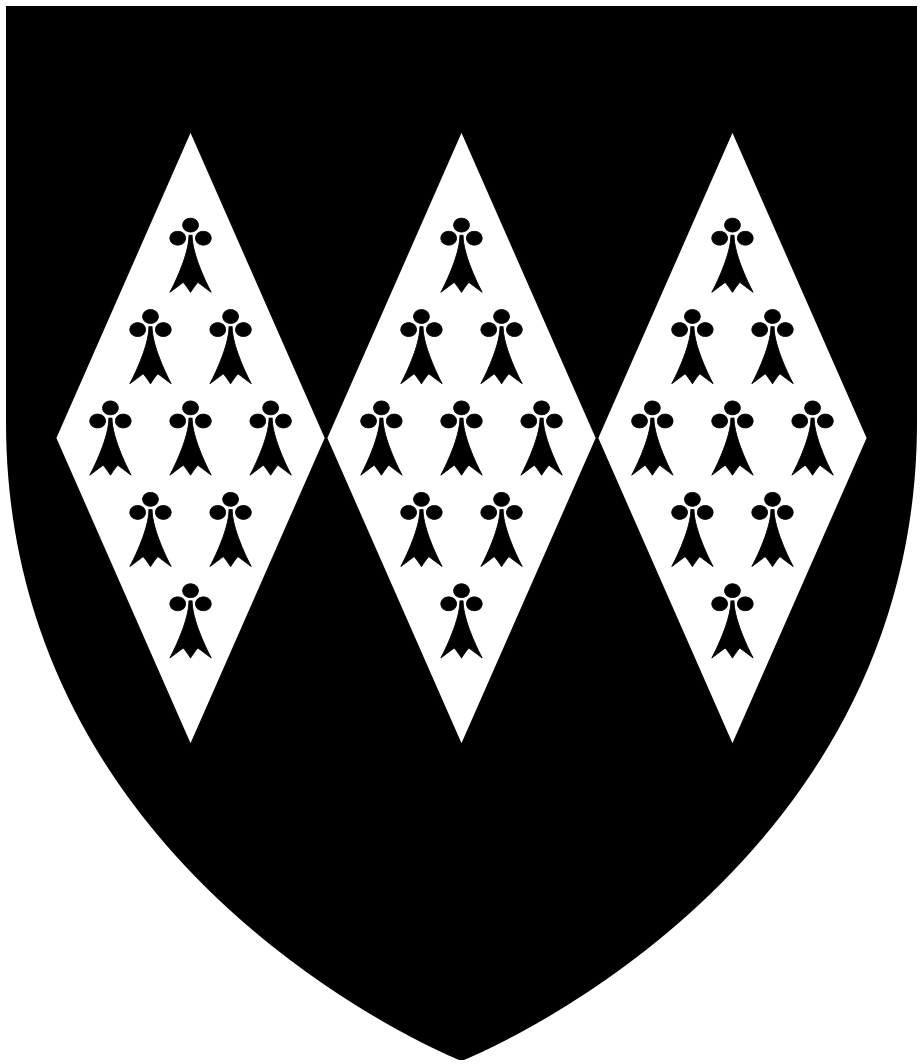
- Sable, three lozenges conjoined in fess ermine
- Creation date: 19 January 1898
- Created by: Queen Victoria
- Peerage: Peerage of the United Kingdom
- First holder: Hardinge Giffard, 1st Baron Halsbury
- Last holder: Adam Giffard, 4th Earl of Halsbury
- Remainder to: 1st Earl's heirs male of the body lawfully begotten
- Subsidiary titles: Viscount Tiverton; Baron Halsbury
- Status: Extinct
- Extinction date: 2010

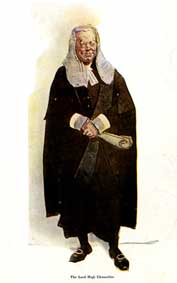
Hardinge Giffard, 1st Earl of Halsbury

Earl of Halsbury, in the County of Devon, was a title in the Peerage of the United Kingdom. Halsbury is a historic manor in the parish of Parkham, near Bideford, Devon, long the seat of the Giffard family and sold by them in the 18th. century. The title was created on 19 January 1898 for the lawyer and Conservative politician Hardinge Giffard, 1st Baron Halsbury, and son of Stanley Lees Giffard, the first editor of the Evening Standard newspaper. Hardinge Giffard was Lord High Chancellor of Great Britain from 1885 to 1886, 1886 to 1892 and 1895 to 1905, and had already been created Baron Halsbury, of Halsbury in the County of Devon, on 26 June 1885, and was made Viscount Tiverton, of nearby Tiverton, at the same time he was given the earldom. Those titles were also in the Peerage of the United Kingdom. He was descended from the family of Giffard of Brightley, Chittlehampton, a junior line of Giffard of Halsbury. A younger son of the first of the Brightley family was Roger Giffard (d.1603) who purchased Tiverton Castle which he made his home. The 1st Earl in fact had no close connection with Halsbury, as the closest of his ancestors born there was Sir Roger Giffard of Brightley (d.1547) and even less with Tiverton, the home of none of his ancestors but only of a very distant cousin, but nevertheless chose these places as his titles.

The 2nd Earl styled himself "Lord Tiverton" until his succession to the title in 1921, and as a major in the Royal Navy Air Service during World War I produced in September 1917 the first comprehensive plan for strategic bombing that became a major influence for plans and doctrine used by British and American air forces in World War II. Halsbury's grandson, the third Earl (who succeeded his father), was a scientist and the first Chancellor of Brunel University, the coat of arms of which to this day includes an element, an ermine lozenge, alluding to the role of the Earl in its founding as a university.

The fourth Earl did not use his title and did not use the courtesy title of Viscount Tiverton which he was entitled to from 1943 to 2000. All the titles became extinct on his death in 2010.

The title of the earldom was pronounced "Hauls-bry".

== Earls of Halsbury (1898–2010) ==
- Hardinge Stanley Giffard, 1st Earl of Halsbury (1823–1921)
- Hardinge Goulburn Giffard, 2nd Earl of Halsbury (1880–1943)
- John Anthony Hardinge Giffard, 3rd Earl of Halsbury (1908–2000)
- Adam Edward Giffard, 4th Earl of Halsbury (1934–2010)
