= John Grenville (disambiguation) =

John Grenville is a historian.

John Grenville may also refer to:

- John Grenville, High Sheriff of Devon in 1395
- John Granville, 1st Earl of Bath (1628–1701), born John Grenville
- John Grenville (MP for Exeter), MP for Exeter
- John Grenville (MP for Devon), MP for Devon (UK Parliament constituency)

== See also ==
- John Greville (disambiguation)
