= HMS Manilla (1809) =

Royal Navy fifth-rate frigate

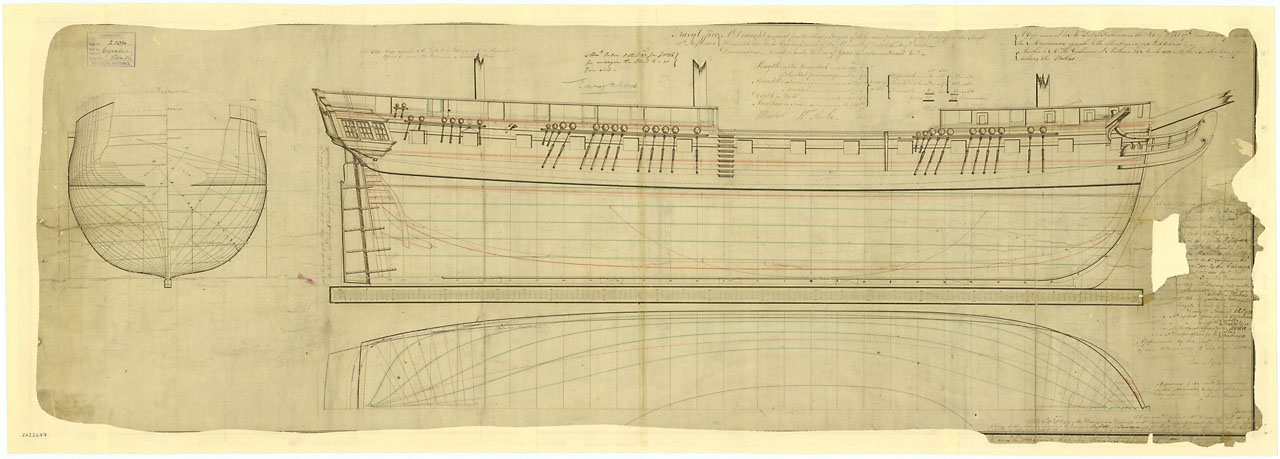
- 1803 plan of the Apollo class

History

United Kingdom
- Name: Manilla
- Namesake: Manila
- Ordered: 29 December 1806
- Builder: Woolwich Dockyard
- Laid down: October 1807
- Launched: 11 September 1809
- Completed: 18 October 1809
- Commissioned: September 1809
- Fate: Wrecked, 28 January 1812

General characteristics
- Class & type: Fifth-rate Apollo-class frigate
- Tons burthen: 94720/94 (bm)
- Length: 145 ft (44.2 m) (upper deck); 121 ft 8 1/2 in (37.1 m) (keel)
- Beam: 38 ft 3 in (11.7 m)
- Draught: 10 ft 3 in (3.1 m) (forward); 14 ft 6 in (4.4 m) (aft)
- Depth of hold: 13 ft 3 in (4 m)
- Propulsion: Sails
- Complement: 264
- Armament: UD: 28 × 18-pounder guns; QD: 2 × 9-pounder guns + 10 × 32-pounder carronades; Fc: 2 × 9-pounder guns + 4 × 32-pounder carronades

HMS Manilla was a 36-gun fifth-rate Apollo-class frigate of the Royal Navy. Commissioned by Captain George Seymour in September 1809, Manilla's first service was in a squadron operating in the Tagus. She conveyed Lieutenant-General Sir John Sherbrooke to Halifax, Nova Scotia, in late 1811, returning to England with Lieutenant-General Gordon Drummond.

In January 1812 Manilla was sent to the Texel to ascertain the fates of two warships lost there in December. On 28 January a navigational error by one of Manilla's pilots caused the ship to run aground on the Haak Sands, near where Hero had been wrecked. After attempts to dislodge the frigate failed, distress signals were fired and seen from Vice-Admiral Jan Willem de Winter's Dutch squadron in the Texel. After several days of battling against the poor weather, Dutch boats evacuated the 243 survivors from Manilla on 31 January. The ship was left to be destroyed by the sea, and the crew was held as prisoners of war in France for the remainder of the Napoleonic Wars.

== Design ==
Manilla was a 36-gun, 18-pounder Apollo-class frigate. Designed by Surveyor of the Navy Sir William Rule, the Apollo class originally consisted of three ships constructed between 1798 and 1803. The class formed part of the Royal Navy's response to the French Revolutionary Wars and need for more warships to serve in it. The original Apollo design was then revived at the start of the Napoleonic Wars in 1803, with twenty-four ships ordered to it over the next nine years. This order came about as the threat from the French fleet against Britain began to dissipate, especially after the Battle of Trafalgar in 1805. The Royal Navy stopped ordering specifically large and offensively capable warships, and instead focused on standardised classes of ships that were usually more moderate in size, but through larger numbers would be able to effectively combat the expected increase in global economic warfare.

The Apollo class became the standard frigate design for this task, alongside the Vengeur-class ship of the line and Cruizer-class brig-sloop. The Apollo class was chosen to fulfil the role of standardised frigate because of how well the lone surviving ship of the first batch, HMS Euryalus, had performed, providing "all-round excellence" according to naval historian Robert Gardiner. Trials of ships of the class showed that they were all capable of reaching around 12 knots (22 km/h) and were very well balanced, although prone to pitching deeply in heavy seas. They also had a high storage capacity, allowing for upwards of six months' provisions.

== Construction ==
In this second batch of Apollo-class frigates, half were ordered to be built at commercial shipyards and half at Royal Navy Dockyards. Manilla, in the latter group of ships, was ordered on 29 December 1806 to be built by shipwright Edward Sison at Woolwich Dockyard. She was the thirteenth frigate to be ordered to the renewed design.

Manilla was laid down in October the following year, and launched on 11 September 1809 with the following dimensions: 145 feet (44.2 m) along the upper deck, 121 feet 8 1/2 inches (37.1 m) at the keel, with a beam of 38 feet 3 inches (11.7 m) and a depth in the hold of 13 feet 3 inches (4 m). The ship had a draught of 10 feet 3 inches (3.1 m) forward and 14 feet 6 inches (4.4 m) aft, and measured 94720/94 tons burthen. She was named after Manila, with the Royal Navy's use of the name dating back to 1781, and christened by Sampson Eardley, 1st Baron Eardley.

The fitting out process for Manilla was completed on 18 October, also at Woolwich. With a crew complement of 264, the frigate held twenty-six 18-pounder long guns on her upper deck. Complimenting this armament were ten 32-pounder carronades and two 9-pounder long guns on the quarterdeck, with an additional two 9-pounder long guns and four 32-pounder carronades on the forecastle. Manilla's equipment stayed generally true to the original design; soon after her launch the Navy Board attempted to have several experimental iron water tanks, designed by Richard Trevithick, added to her for trials but Manilla's captain successfully petitioned to have them removed, arguing that they were too large for the frigate.

== Service ==
Manilla was commissioned in September 1809 by Captain George Seymour, and then sailed to Portugal on 14 January 1810, where she served with a squadron in the Tagus. Manilla recaptured the American ship Agenoria on 12 September that year. By August 1811 the ship was employed escorting convoys of merchant ships through parts of the English Channel. In September Seymour was temporarily replaced in command by Captain John Joyce while the former was absent. Manilla subsequently sailed from Portsmouth to Halifax, Nova Scotia, carrying Lieutenant-General Sir John Sherbrooke to take up post as Lieutenant Governor of Nova Scotia. The ship departed on 9 September and arrived at Halifax on 16 October.

Manilla left Halifax on 24 October with Lieutenant-General Gordon Drummond and his family on board. They had arrived in England by 22 November. Still under the command of Joyce, the ship began to cruise off the Texel. Her orders were to ascertain the fates of the 74-gun ship of the line HMS Hero and 18-gun brig-sloop HMS Grasshopper, the former having been wrecked off the Texel on 25 December and the latter stranded and captured in the same incident. While off the Texel Manilla at some point captured the Dutch ship Onverwagt.

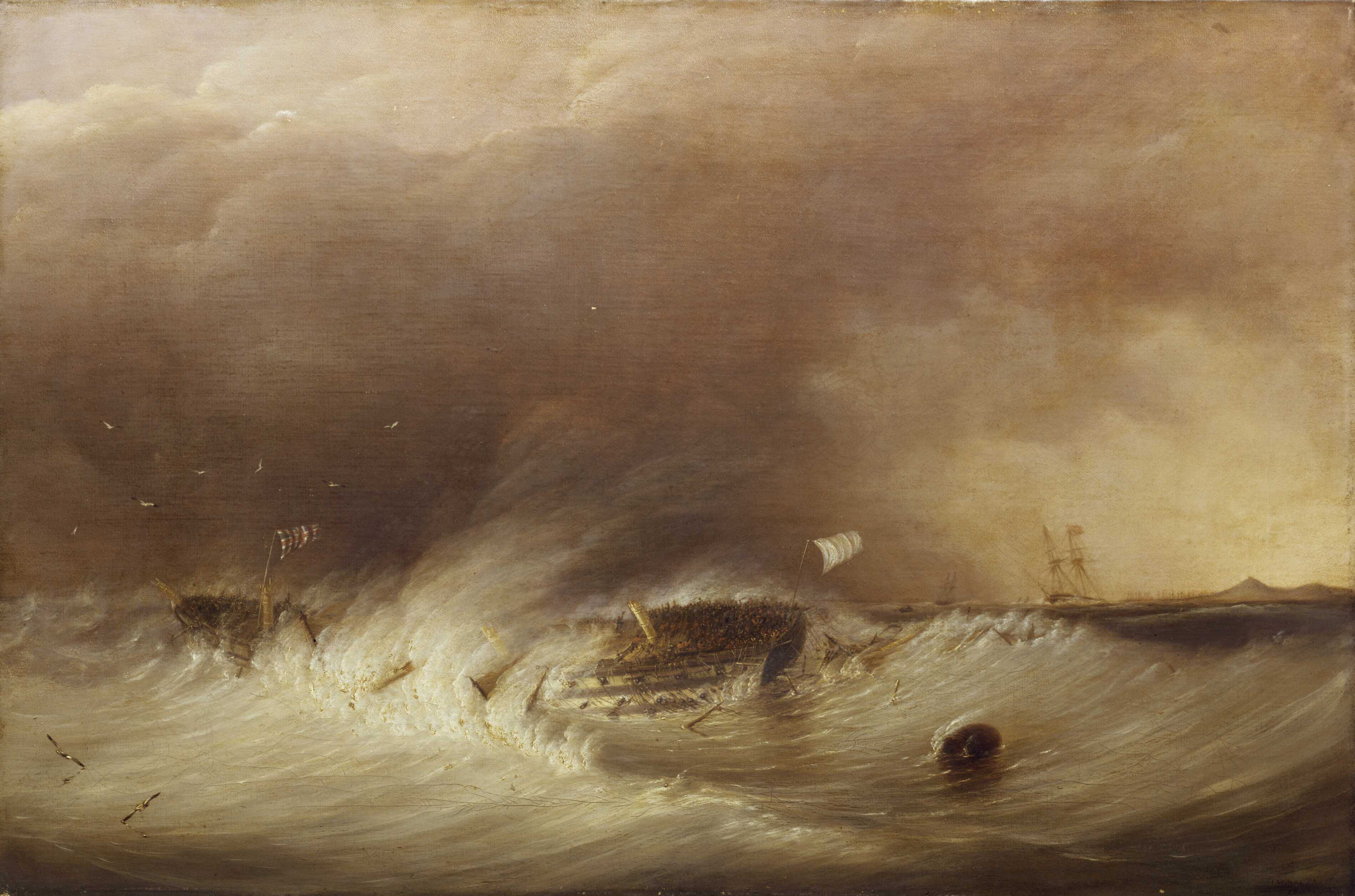
HMS Hero wrecked one month before Manilla also in the Texel

On 28 January 1812, at about 6:30pm, a gale was blowing when the ship's pilot calculated that Manilla was sailing further out to sea than she actually was. As a result of this mistake the frigate struck the Haak Sands, at the mouth of the Texel. This was close to where Hero had been wrecked one month previously. Joyce began attempts to remove Manilla from the sand bank she was stuck on, but having been wrecked at high tide the precarious position of the ship only increased as the tide went out again. Joyce sent three of Manilla's boats with thirty-six men in an attempt to use an anchor to dislodge the ship; the boats disappeared and the men were assumed killed. With the ship unmovable and the danger to the crew increasing, at 9pm Joyce had several distress signals fired from the guns.

Vice-Admiral Jan Willem de Winter, commanding the Dutch squadron in the Texel, saw Joyce's signals and sent his small boats out to assist the frigate. As the gale increased in strength the Dutch boats were unable to get close to Manilla, returning to shore at 3am. Joyce had the ship's masts cut away and ordered the building of a raft which thirty-six men then got on, abandoning hope of saving the frigate. Come the morning of 29 January no British ships were in sight of Manilla and the Dutch boats were unwilling to attempt to close with the ship while she still flew British colours. Joyce called a council of his officers who agreed that they had no other immediate form of rescue available to them, and a French ensign was raised above the British.

The Dutch advanced on the ship, despite the sea still being very rough, and reached the shallows around her. From there the boat commanded by the Dutch chief pilot got close enough that Manilla's crew were able to lower their raft down, whence the thirty-six men transhipped into the Dutch boats. One of the rescued men died before they could reach shore, with two more severely injured. The poor weather meant that the Dutch were unable to complete any further rescue that day, but six boats were left anchored nearby to take advantage of any improvement.

During the rescue attempts a box of cartridges exploded when a spark from one of Manilla's blue signal lights landed on it, killing eight members of the crew, wounding eight others, and destroying the forecastle. The ship's drunken gunner was blamed for the incident. The weather abated in the evening of 29 January and the Dutch restarted their rescue attempts, being guided in the dark by guns fired from Manilla. The boats reached the frigate in the morning of 31 January and took off the whole crew, Joyce leaving last. On 1 February the three supposedly lost boats from Manilla landed on Texel Island "with some men", according to de Winter.

The 243 men saved from Manilla, as prisoners of war, were taken to Amsterdam, and from there sent by land to Verdun where they spent the remainder of the war. (Note: Joyce had been expected to return command of Manilla to Seymour when the frigate next visited Deal, Kent, with the former then taking command of the 22-gun post-ship HMS Cossack instead.) The wreck of Manilla was left on the Haak Sands, with the waves frequently covering the entire ship. De Winter expected on 1 February that the ship would be completely destroyed by the sea within a day. One of Manilla's pilots escaped from Amsterdam in March, reaching Yarmouth by boat later in the month. In the subsequent court martial for the loss of Manilla, Joyce was reprimanded for not altering course sooner and warned for his conduct, while both pilots received severe reprimands.
