= Edward Underhill =

English politician and Protestant evangelical

Edward Underhill (1512 – 1576 or later), of Hunningham and Baginton, Warwickshire and Limehouse, Middlesex, was an English politician. He was Lord of the Manor of Hunningham.

Underhill was a gospeller. He was an MP for Tavistock in March 1553.

== Royal wedding at Winchester ==
It was said that Underhill was allowed to attend the wedding of Mary I of England and Philip of Spain in Winchester and serve at the feast at Wolvesey Castle, after Humphrey Radcliffe, Lieutenant of the Gentlemen Pensioners, spoke in his favour. Underhill's presence at Winchester was questioned by the gentleman usher John Norris. Underhill wrote that Philip of Spain was not pleased to see that English aristocrats were better dancers.
