= William Bowles (Royal Navy officer) =

Royal Navy Admiral of the Fleet (1780-1869)

Admiral of the Fleet Sir William Bowles KCB
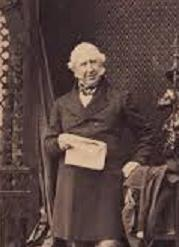
- Sir William Bowles
- Born: 25 May 1780; Salisbury, Wiltshire
- Died: 2 July 1869 (aged 89); Hill Street, London
- Military career
- Allegiance: United Kingdom
- Branch: Royal Navy
- Service years: 1796–1860
- Rank: Admiral of the Fleet
- Commands: HMS Zebra; HMS Warspite; HMS Medusa; HMS Aquilon; HMS Nemesis; South America Station; HMY William & Mary; Portsmouth Command
- Conflicts: French Revolutionary Wars; Napoleonic Wars
- Awards: Knight Commander of the Order of the Bath

Admiral of the Fleet Sir William Bowles, KCB (25 May 1780 – 2 July 1869) was a senior Royal Navy officer and Conservative Party politician. After serving as a junior officer in the French Revolutionary Wars, he became commanding officer of the sloop HMS Zebra and took part in the bombardment of Copenhagen in September 1807 during the Napoleonic Wars. As commanding officer of the fifth-rate HMS Medusa, he took part in operations off the north coast of Spain and led a naval brigade in a raid on Santoña.

Bowles went on to be Commander-in-Chief, South America Station before becoming Third Naval Lord in the Second Peel ministry as well as Member of Parliament (MP) for Launceston in Cornwall. He published a number of papers arguing for innovations in naval warfare and naval administration before becoming Commander-in-Chief, Portsmouth.

== Early career ==
The sloop HMS Zebra (centre) which Bowles commanded during the bombardment of Copenhagen

Born the son of William Bowles and Dinah Bowles (daughter of Admiral Sir Thomas Frankland), Bowles joined the Royal Navy in September 1796. He was assigned to the third-rate HMS Theseus in the Channel Squadron and saw action off Cádiz during the French Revolutionary Wars. Promoted to midshipman, he transferred to the third-rate HMS Captain in June 1797, to the corvette HMS Daphne in the North Sea early in 1798 and to the fifth-rate HMS Hydra in November 1800. After that, he moved to the fifth-rate HMS Acasta in the Mediterranean Fleet and then to the sloop HMS Driver. Promoted to lieutenant on 30 August 1803, he transferred to the fifth-rate HMS Cambrian on the North America and West Indies Station, then to the fourth-rate HMS Leander and then to the fifth-rate HMS Milan.

Promoted to commander on 22 January 1806, Bowles became commanding officer of the sloop HMS Zebra in March 1807 and took part in the bombardment of Copenhagen in September 1807 during the Napoleonic Wars. Promoted to captain on 13 October 1807, he went on to command the third-rate HMS Warspite in June 1809 and the fifth-rate HMS Medusa in June 1810. In HMS Medusa, he took part in operations off the north coast of Spain and led a naval brigade in a raid on Santoña. He next became commanding officer of the fifth-rate HMS Aquilon in March 1811 and saw action in the Baltic Sea before becoming commanding officer of the sixth-rate HMS Nemesis in April 1811 and sailing with her for duties off the West Coast of Africa. He served on trade protection duties off the Río de la Plata during 1813.

Promoted to commodore, Bowles became Commander-in-Chief, South America Station, with his broad pennant in the fifth-rate HMS Amphion, in 1816 and then became commanding officer of the yacht HMY William & Mary early in 1822 before moving on to be Comptroller-General of the Coast Guard in July 1822. In a paper published in 1830 entitled Remarks on the Conduct of the Naval Administration of Great Britain he argued for the introduction of steam warships and the creation of a gunnery school: the latter ambition was realised with the formation of HMS Excellent later that year. He was appointed a Companion of the Order of the Bath on 12 April 1839.

== Senior command ==
Hill Street, London: Bowles lived at No. 8

Promoted to rear admiral on 23 November 1841, Bowles became Commander of the Squadron of Evolution (formerly known as the Experimental Squadron), with his flag in the first-rate HMS Caledonia in May 1843 and was instructed to test various innovations in naval warfare. He became Third Naval Lord in the Second Peel ministry in May 1844 and was also elected Conservative Party Member of Parliament (MP) for Launceston in Cornwall following a by-election brought about by the resignation of Field Marshal Sir Henry Hardinge that same month. When the Government fell in July 1846 Bowles resigned from office. In a republished paper issued in 1847 he additionally called for a centrally organised system of naval recruitment and in a paper published in 1848 entitled Thoughts on National Defence he argued for a system of fortifications 10 miles deep around the United Kingdom.

Promoted vice-admiral on 8 March 1852, Bowles published a paper entitled Considerations on the Late Naval War in 1856 and, having been promoted to full admiral on 28 November 1857, he published another paper entitled A Recommendation for Abolishing the Rank of Commander in the Royal Navy in 1858. He became Commander-in-Chief, Portsmouth in March 1859 but was obliged to resign after mishandling the response to an alleged mutiny in the second-rate HMS Princess Royal in November 1859. Bowles had wanted to court-martial the offenders but the Government would not authorise that course of action. He was advanced to Knight Commander of the Order of the Bath on 10 November 1862, appointed Rear-Admiral of the United Kingdom on 23 September 1865 and appointed Vice-Admiral of the United Kingdom on 26 November 1866. Promoted to Admiral of the Fleet on 15 January 1869, he died at his home at 8 Hill Street, London on 2 July 1869.

== Family ==
On 9 August 1820, Bowles married The Hon. Frances Temple, daughter of the late Henry Temple, 2nd Viscount Palmerston and sister of the Henry John Temple, 3rd Viscount Palmerston who became Secretary at War and later Prime Minister; they had no children.

== Sources ==
- Craig, F. W. S. (1989) [1977]. British parliamentary election results 1832–1885 (2nd ed.). Chichester: Parliamentary Research Services. ISBN 0-900178-26-4.
- Heathcote, Tony (2002). The British Admirals of the Fleet 1734 – 1995. Pen & Sword. ISBN 0-85052-835-6.
- Winfield, Rif (2007). British Warships in the Age of Sail, 1714 to 1792. Seaforth Publishing, London. ISBN 978-1-84415-700-6.

Parliament of the United Kingdom
Preceded by Sir Henry Hardinge	Member of Parliament for Launceston; 1844–1852	Succeeded by Josceline William Percy
Military offices
Preceded by Sir George Seymour	Third Naval Lord; 1844–1846	Succeeded by Sir Maurice Berkeley
Preceded by Sir George Seymour	Commander-in-Chief, Portsmouth; 1859–1860	Succeeded by Sir Henry Bruce
Honorary titles
Preceded by Sir George Seymour	Rear-Admiral of the United Kingdom; 1865–1866	Succeeded by Sir Phipps Hornby
Preceded by Sir George Seymour	Vice-Admiral of the United Kingdom; 1866–1869	Succeeded by Sir George Sartorius
