= John Cokeworthy =

John Cokeworthy may refer to:

- John Cokeworthy I, English politician
- John Cokeworthy II, MP for Wareham (UK Parliament constituency)
