= Hardinge Giffard, 1st Earl of Halsbury =

British politician and Chancellor (1823–1921)

The Right Honourable The Earl of Halsbury PC
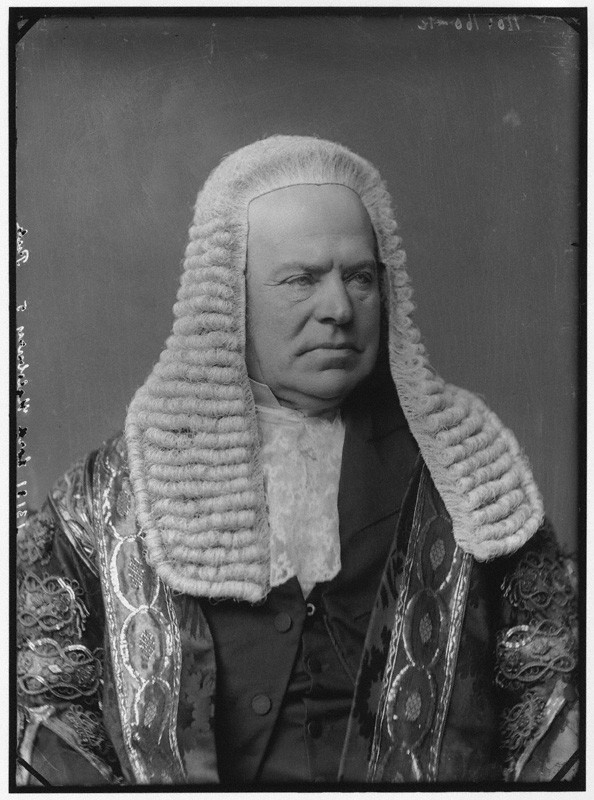
- The 1st Earl of Halsbury (1883)

Lord Chancellor Lord High Steward for the trial of: List: The Earl Russell
- In office 24 June 1885 – 28 January 1886
- Monarch: Victoria
- Prime Minister: The Marquess of Salisbury
- Preceded by: The Earl of Selborne
- Succeeded by: The Lord Herschell
- In office 3 August 1886 – 11 August 1892
- Monarch: Victoria
- Prime Minister: The Marquess of Salisbury
- Preceded by: The Lord Herschell
- Succeeded by: The Lord Herschell
- In office 29 June 1895 – 4 December 1905
- Monarchs: Victoria; Edward VII
- Prime Minister: The Marquess of Salisbury; Arthur Balfour
- Preceded by: The Lord Herschell
- Succeeded by: The Lord Loreburn

Personal details
- Born: 3 September 1823 Pentonville, London
- Died: 11 December 1921 (aged 98)
- Party: Conservative
- Spouses: Caroline Humphreys (m. 1852; died 1873) Wilhelmina Woodfall (m. 1874)
- Children: Hardinge Goulburn Giffard, 2nd Earl of Halsbury
- Parent: Stanley Lees Giffard (father)
- Education: Merton College, Oxford

Hardinge Stanley Giffard, 1st Earl of Halsbury (3 September 1823 – 11 December 1921) was a British barrister and Conservative politician. He served three times as Lord High Chancellor of Great Britain, for a total of seventeen years, a record not equalled by anyone except Lords Hardwicke and Eldon.

The son of a newspaper editor, Giffard was called to the English bar in 1850 and acquired a large criminal practice, defending the likes of Governor Eyre and Arthur Orton, the Tichborne claimant. He was chosen as solicitor-general by Disraeli in 1874, despite not securing a seat in the House of Commons until three years later. In 1885, he was appointed to the lord chancellorship by Lord Salisbury, and was created Baron Halsbury, serving until the following year. He then held the lord chancellorship again from 1886 until 1892, and from 1895 until 1905, when he resigned, aged 86. In 1898, he was further honoured with an earldom and a viscounty, becoming the Earl of Halsbury.

After relinquishing the lord chancellorship, Halsbury continued to sit as a law lord, delivering a judgement aged 93 in 1916. During the constitutional crisis over the Parliament Act 1911, Halsbury was one of the principal leaders of the rebel faction of Tory peers—labelled the "Ditchers"—that resolved on all out opposition to the government's bill limiting the House of Lords' veto whatever happened. He was also the first editor of the legal encyclopaedia which today bears his name, Halsbury's Laws of England.

During his tenure on the woolsack, Halsbury was accused of favouring conservative lawyers for judicial appointments, although the consideration of political allegiances for judicial appointments was a common practice at the time, and later commentators have blamed bad luck for the failure of several of the judges he appointed. He was also accused of allowing political considerations affect his decisions as a judge, in particularly as they related to trade unions. He was, however, sympathetic to working men seeking workmen's compensation. In the realm of legal reform, he was responsible for enacting the Land Transfer Act 1897 (60 & 61 Vict. c. 65) and the Criminal Evidence Act 1898 (61 & 62 Vict. c. 36).

== Early life and career ==
Born in Pentonville, London, Giffard was the third son of Stanley Lees Giffard, editor of the London Evening Standard, by his wife Susanna, daughter of Francis Moran, Downhill, Ballina, County Mayo. Hardinge attended Merton College, Oxford. During his time at Merton, he rowed in four seat of the Merton College Boat Club in 1844. His mother died when he was five, and his father married his cousin, Mary Anne Giffard. He was educated by his father at home, before entering Merton College, Oxford, where he obtained a fourth-class degree in literae humaniores in 1845. Between 1845 and 1848, he helped his father edit the Standard.

Having entered the Inner Temple as a student in 1848, he was called to the bar there in 1850. Giffard joined the Westen, then the South Wales circuits. Afterwards he had a large practice at the Central Criminal Court and the Middlesex sessions, and he was for several years junior prosecuting counsel to the Treasury, and working treasurer in 1881. He was engaged in most of the celebrated trials of his time, including the Overend and Gurney and the Tichborne cases. He became Queen's Counsel in 1865, and a bencher of the Inner Temple.

== Solicitor-General and House of Commons, 1874–1885 ==
Giffard twice contested Cardiff for the Conservatives in 1868 and 1874, but he was still without a seat in the House of Commons when he was appointed Solicitor-General by Disraeli in 1875 and received the customary knighthood. He also failed to gain a seat in a by-election in Horsham in 1876.

In 1877 he succeeded in obtaining a seat, when he was returned for Launceston, which he continued to represent until his elevation to the peerage.

Between 1883 and 1919, he had been the constable of Launceston Castle, he was appointed by Edward VII, Duke of Cornwall.

== Lord Chancellor and House of Lords, 1885–1905 ==
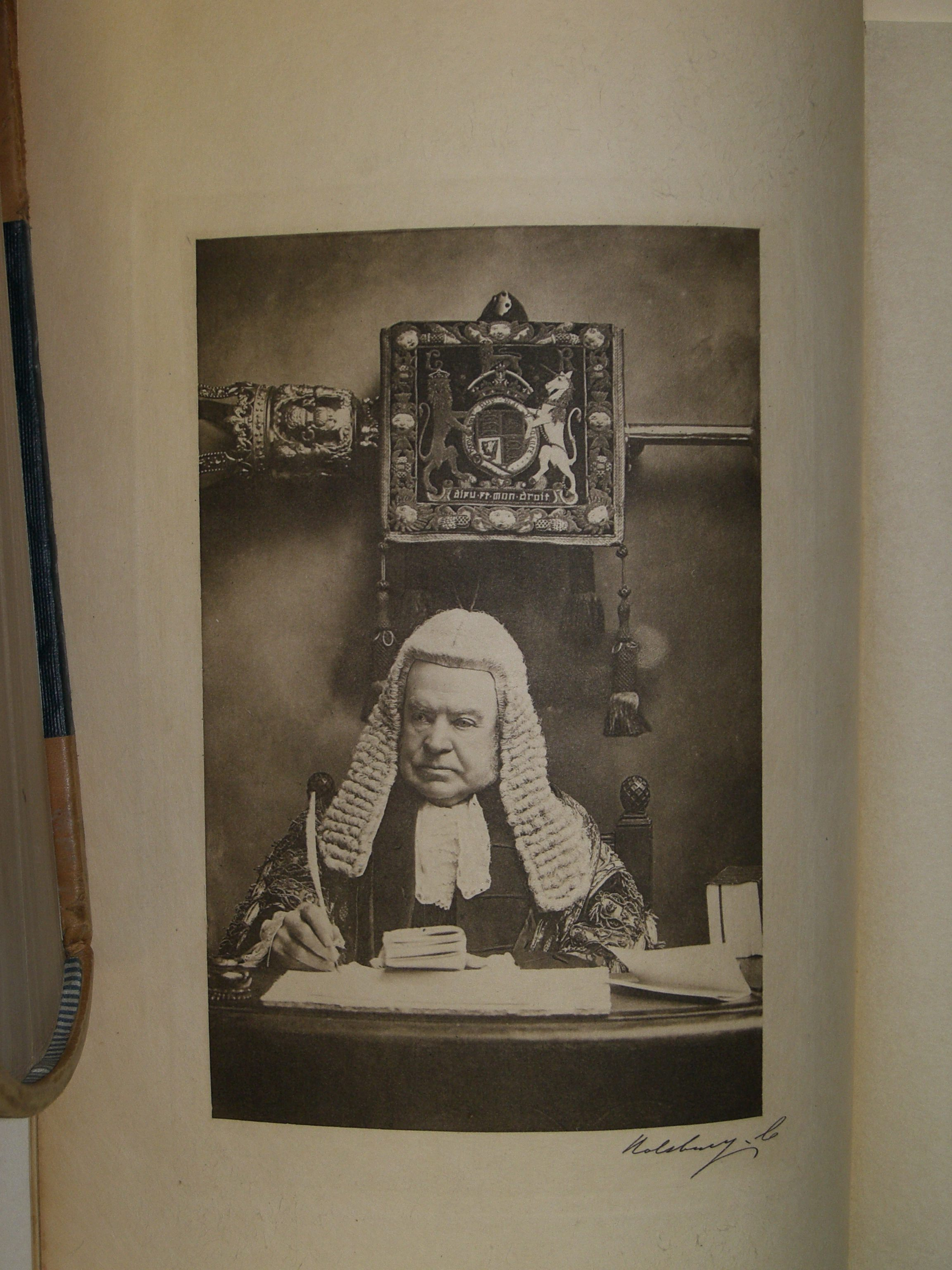
Image of Hardinge Giffard, 1st Earl of Halsbury from Halsbury's Laws of England, 1st ed, Vol 1.

In 1885, Giffard was appointed Lord High Chancellor of Great Britain in Lord Salisbury's first administration, and was created Baron Halsbury, of Halsbury in the County of Devon, thus forming a remarkable exception to the rule that no criminal lawyer could ever reach the woolsack. He resumed the position in 1886 and held it until 1892 and again from 1895 to 1905, his tenure of the office, broken only by the brief Liberal ministries of 1886 and 1892–1895, being longer than that of any Lord Chancellor since Lord Eldon. In 1898 he was created Earl of Halsbury and Viscount Tiverton, of Tiverton, Devon.

Halsbury was an opponent of the British trade union movement and used his position to appoint anti-union justices in the judicial system, leading to decisions such as Taff Vale Rly Co v Amalgamated Society of Rly Servants and Quinn v Leathem which restricted the unions' right to strike. The legal threats to trade unions at this time drove them to form the Labour Party to seek parliamentary representation.

== Later career and leader of the "ditchers", 1905–1921 ==
During the crisis over the Parliament Act 1911, Halsbury was one of the principal leaders of the rebel faction of Tory peers—labelled the "Ditchers"—that resolved on all out opposition to the government's bill limiting the House of Lords' veto whatever happened. At a meeting of Conservative peers on 21 July of that year, Halsbury shouted out "I will divide even if I am alone". As Halsbury left the meeting a reporter asked him what was going to happen. Halsbury immediately replied: "Government by a Cabinet controlled by rank socialists".

Halsbury was also President of the Royal Society of Literature, Grand Warden of English Freemasons, and High Steward of the University of Oxford, and warden of guild of undergraduates in University of Birmingham. He also became the chairman of guilds in the London institute, president of royal society of literature in 1911–12.

Halsbury's lasting legacy was the compilation of a complete digest of "Halsbury's Laws of England" (1907–1917), a major reference work published in many volumes and often called simply "Halsbury's". "Halsbury's Laws" was followed by a second multiple-volume reference work in 1929, "Halsbury's Statutes", and later by "Halsbury's Statutory Instruments".

Lord Halsbury died on 11 December 1921, aged 98.

== Family ==
Halsbury married firstly Caroline, daughter of William Corne Humphreys, in 1852. There were no children from this marriage. Caroline died in September 1873. Halsbury married secondly Wilhelmina, daughter of Henry Woodfall, in 1874. He died in December 1921, aged 98, and was succeeded by his only son from his second marriage, Hardinge. The Countess of Halsbury died in December 1927.

== Character and assessment ==
=== Appearance ===
According to Herbert Stephen, "Halsbury's features were good, and expressive of power and resolution; his short and stoutly built figure lent itself to caricature." To G. R. Rubin, writing later, "In physical appearance he was somewhat plain and unprepossessing. He had a broad body, and a large head without eyelashes and with an upraised nose. His short legs accentuated his dumpy and pugnacious appearance. But he exuded an expression of power and resolution."

=== Assessments ===
Assessments of Halsbury have varied over the decades. Halsbury's death was not acknowledged in the pages of the Law Quarterly Review, whereas Lord Lindley, who had died two days before Halsbury, was the subject of a tribute.

== In popular culture ==
Halsbury was portrayed by T. P. McKenna in the Granada Television series Lady Killers, in an episode depicting the trial of Kate Webster.

== Notable judgments ==
Among cases in which Halsbury delivered judgment are:

- Salomon v Salomon
- Mogul Steamship Co Ltd v McGregor, Gow & Co [1892] AC 25
- British South Africa Co v Companhia de Moçambique [1893] AC 602 – the House of Lords overturned a Court of Appeal decision and by so doing established the Mozambique rule, a common law rule in private international law that renders actions relating to title in foreign land, the right to possession of foreign land, and trespass to foreign land non-justiciable in common law jurisdictions.
- Bray v Ford [1896] AC 44
- Taff Vale Railway Co v Amalgamated Society of Railway Servants [1901] AC 426
- Daimler Co Ltd v Continental Tyre and Rubber Co (Great Britain) Ltd [1916] 2 AC 307

Parliament of the United Kingdom
Preceded by James Henry Deakin	Member of Parliament for Launceston; 1877–1885	Succeeded by Richard Webster
Legal offices
Preceded by Sir John Holker	Solicitor General for England and Wales; 1875–1880	Succeeded by Sir Farrer Herschell
Political offices
Preceded by The Earl of Selborne	Lord High Chancellor of Great Britain; 1885–1886	Succeeded by The Lord Herschell
Preceded by The Lord Herschell	Lord High Chancellor of Great Britain; 1886–1892	Succeeded by The Lord Herschell
Preceded by The Lord Herschell	Lord High Chancellor of Great Britain; 1895–1905	Succeeded by The Lord Loreburn
Peerage of the United Kingdom
New creation	Earl of Halsbury; 1898–1921	Succeeded by Hardinge Giffard
New creation	Baron Halsbury; 1885–1921	Succeeded by Hardinge Giffard
