= George Blyth (MP) =

16th-century English politician

George Blyth (died 1581), of Cambridge and London and York, was an English politician.

He was a member (MP) of the parliament of England for Huntingdon in 1563; Maldon in 1571 and Dunheved in 1572.
