= 1877 Launceston by-election =

UK Parliamentary by-election

The 1877 Launceston by-election was fought on 3 March 1877. The by-election was fought due to the resignation of the incumbent Conservative MP, James Henry Deakin (junior). It was won by the Conservative candidate Sir Hardinge Stanley Giffard.

1877 Launceston by-election
Party	Candidate	Votes	%	±%
Conservative	Hardinge Giffard	392	58.9	−8.8
Liberal	Robert Collier	274	41.1	+8.8
Majority		118	17.8	−16.6
Turnout		666	80.6	−4.1
Registered electors		826		
Conservative hold		Swing	-8.8	
