= Edward Leigh, 5th Baron Leigh =

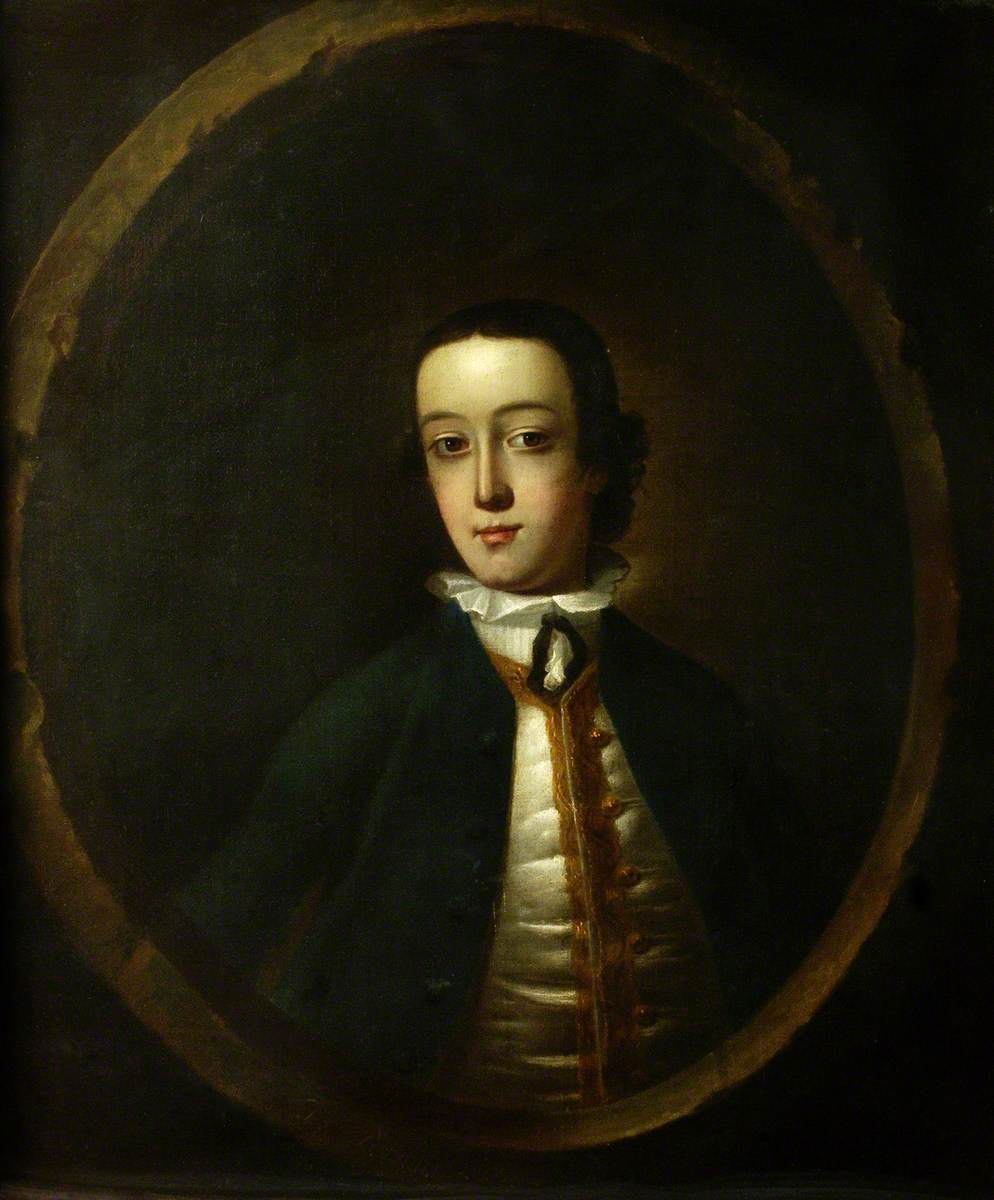
Edward (1742–1786), Lord Leigh, Aged 11, painting by artist from circle of Thomas Hudson, c. 1753.

Edward Leigh, 5th Baron Leigh (1742–1786) was descended from Thomas Leigh, Lord Mayor of London in 1558, and inherited the Leigh family seat at Stoneleigh Abbey, Stoneleigh, Warwickshire following the death of his father, Thomas Leigh, 4th Baron Leigh, in 1749. He was Lord of the Manor of Hunningham.

Leigh spent his early years under the guardianship of his mother's family, the Cravens of Coombe Abbey. He attended Westminster School and matriculated as a gentleman commoner at Oriel College in 1761, receiving his MA in 1764. Aged 25, Leigh was elected High Steward of the University of Oxford and was made a Doctor of Civil Law.

At the same time, he was active at Stoneleigh: collecting art, furniture and books, he also made architectural plans for the house. In 1766 and 1797 payments are recorded to Bedlam Hospital and John Munro or his son Thomas Munro, the mad-doctors who later attended to George III, and in 1774 an Inquisition of Insanity found that Leigh had been 'a Lunatick of unsound mind' over the previous five years and committed him to the guardianship of his sister, Hon. Mary Leigh, his uncle Reverend John Craven, and his cousin William, Lord Craven at which point he vanished from public view. A prayer written by his sister Mary in about 1775 survives:

O Lord look down from Heaven, in much pity and compassion, upon thy afflicted servant, who is not able to now look up to thee, hear O most merciful Father my Prayers on his behalf, and preserve him from doing any harm to himself or to any other: be pleased to remove all frightfull imaginations far from him, and if it be the blessed will, O our God restore him to his reason and understanding, so will we all give thanks to thee for ever and ever. Amen.

Leigh died unmarried and without heirs in 1786, leaving a complex will that would create legal disputes into the 19th century. Among the provisions, the will gave Leigh's scientific instruments and his library of about 1,000 books to his alma mater, Oriel College. After Leigh's death, his personal papers were deliberately destroyed by John Dodson, a Fellow of Oriel, who had been sent to Stoneleigh to sort Leigh's books. The destruction was sanctioned by Leigh's uncle and sister.

== Sources ==
- Purcell, Mark, 'A lunatick of unsound mind': Edward, Lord Leigh (1742–86) and the refounding of Oriel College Library p. 246-260. Bodleian Library Record. Vol. 17, no. 3-4 (Apr-Oct 2001).

Peerage of England
Preceded by Thomas Leigh	Baron Leigh; 1749–1786	Extinct
