= Launceston (constituency) =

Former parliamentary constituency in the United Kingdom

- Former borough constituency for the House of Commons

1295–1885
- Seats: Two (1295–1832); one (1832–1885)
- Replaced by: Launceston

Cornwall, North-Eastern or Launceston
- Former county constituency for the House of Commons

1885–1918
- Seats: One
- Created from: East Cornwall, Launceston
- Replaced by: North Cornwall (Majority), Bodmin (Part)

Launceston, also known at some periods as Dunheved, was a parliamentary constituency in Cornwall which returned two Members of Parliament to the British House of Commons from 1295 until 1832, and one member from 1832 until 1918. It was a parliamentary borough until 1885, and a county constituency thereafter.

== Boundaries ==
1832–1885: The old Borough of Launceston and the Parish of St Stephen, and all such parts of the several Parishes of Lawhitton, St Thomas the Apostle, and South Petherwin as are without the old Borough of Launceston.

1885–1918: The Sessional Division of East Middle, East North, Lesnewth, and Stratton, and part of the Sessional Division of Trigg.

== History ==
Launceston was one of 21 parliamentary boroughs in Cornwall between the 16th and 19th centuries; unlike many of these, which had been little more than villages even when established and were rotten boroughs from the start, Launceston had been a town of reasonable size and importance though much in decline by the 19th century. The borough consisted of only part of the present town, as Newport was a separate borough in itself from 1554, though Newport and Launceston were joined as Dunheved, collectively returning members, earlier in that century.

The right to vote was vested theoretically in the mayor, aldermen and those freemen of the borough who were resident at the time they became freemen; but in practice the vote was exercised only by members of the corporation, who were chosen mainly with a view to maintaining the influence of the "patron". Up to 1775, this was generally the head of the Morice family, who also controlled Newport, but in that year Humphry Morice sold his interest in both boroughs to the Duke of Newcastle, whose family retained hold on both until the Great Reform Act 1832. There were about 17 voters in Launceston in 1831, by which time the borough was as rotten as any of the others in Cornwall.

In 1831 the borough had a population of 2,669 and 429 houses. Under the Great Reform Act 1832 the boundaries were extended to encompass the whole town (including Newport, which was abolished as a separate borough), bringing the population up to 5,394. This was sufficient for Launceston to retain one of its two seats.

The borough was eventually abolished in 1885, but the name of the town was transferred to the new county constituency in which it was placed, strictly the North-Eastern or Launceston Division of Cornwall, which also elected a single member. This covered a much larger, rural, area including Callington, Calstock and Bude-Stratton. This constituency in its turn was abolished in 1918, being absorbed mostly into the new Cornwall North constituency.

A list of MPs for Launceston appears in "The Histories of Launceston and Dunheved, in the County of Cornwall." by Richard Peter and Otho Bathurst Peter. 1885. p.387, and many of the names differ from those in the list below.

== Members of Parliament ==
=== Launceston borough ===
==== MPs 1295–1629 ====
- Constituency created (1295)

Parliament	First member	Second member	
1358	John Hamely		
1386	John Cokeworthy I	Roger Leye	
1388 (Feb)	John Cokeworthy I	William Bodrugan	
1388 (Sep)	Thomas Trereise	Thomas Treuref	
1390 (Jan)	John Cokeworthy I	John Syreston	
1390 (Nov)			
1391	John Cokeworthy I	Richard Lovyn	
1393	John Cokeworthy I	Richard Lovyn	
1394			
1395	John Cokeworthy I	Richard Lovyn	
1397 (Jan)	John Cokeworthy I	Richard Tolle	
1397 (Sep)	Roger Menwenick	William Holt	
1399	John Cokeworthy I	John Goly	
1401			
1402	Thomas Colyn	Richard Raddow	
1404 (Jan)			
1404 (Oct)			
1406	Walter Tregarya	John Colet	
1407	Richard Brackish	?John Pengersick	
1410	Edward Burnebury	John Cory	
1411	Edward Burnebury	Richard Trelawny	
1413 (Feb)			
1413 (May)	Edward Burnebury	John Mayhew	
1414 (Apr)			
1414 (Nov)	Edward Burnebury	John Cory	
1415			
1416 (Mar)	Oliver Wyse	Edward Burnebury	
1416 (Oct)			
1417	Edward Burnebury	John Cory	
1419	Edward Burnebury	Edward Burnebury	
1420	Simon Yurle	Edward Burnebury	
1421 (May)	Simon Yurle	John Cory	
1421 (Dec)	John Treffriowe	Edward Burnebury	
1431	Nicholas Aysshton		
1432	Nicholas Aysshton		
1510–1523	No names known		
1529	Sir Edward Ryngley	John Rastell	
1536	?		
1539	?		
1542	?		
1545	William Cordell	Robert Taverner	
1547	William Cordell	Nicholas Carminowe	
First Parliament of 1553	William Ley alias Kempthorne	John Ley alias Kempthorne I	
Second Parliament of 1553	Robert Monson	John Ley alias Kempthorne I	
Parliament of 1554	Arthur Welsh	John Ley alias Kempthorne I	
Parliament of 1554–1555	William Bendlow	John Ley alias Kempthorne I	
Parliament of 1555	Robert Grenville	John Ley alias Kempthorne II	
Parliament of 1558	Thomas Roper	Robert Monson	John Heydon
Parliament of 1559	George Basset	Ayshton Aylworth	William Gibbes
Parliament of 1563–1567	Richard Grenville	Henry Chiverton	
Parliament of 1571	George Grenville	Sampson Lennard	
Parliament of 1572–1581	George Blyth	George Grenville	
Parliament of 1584–1585	Roland Watson	John Glanville	
Parliament of 1586–1587	Roland Watson	John Spurling	
Parliament of 1588–1589	Roland Watson	John Spurling	
Parliament of 1593	Roland Watson	George Grenville	
Parliament of 1597–1598	Herbert Croft	Sir William Bowyer	
Parliament of 1601	John Parker	Gregory Downhall	
Parliament of 1604–1611	Sir Thomas Lake	Ambrose Rous	
Addled Parliament (1614)	Sir Charles Wilmot	William Croft	
Parliament of 1621–1622	John Harris	Thomas Bond	
Happy Parliament (1624–1625)	Sir Francis Crane	Miles Fleetwood	
Useless Parliament (1625)	Sir Bevil Grenville	Richard Scott	
Parliament of 1625–1626	Sir Bevil Grenville	Richard Scott	
Parliament of 1628–1629	Sir Bevil Grenville	Richard Scott	
No Parliament summoned 1629–1640

==== MPs 1640–1832 ====
Year	First member	First party	Second member	Second party
April 1640	Sir Bevil Grenville	Royalist	Ambrose Manaton	Royalist
November 1640	William Coryton		Ambrose Manaton	Royalist
1641	John Harris	Parliamentarian	Ambrose Manaton	Royalist
January 1644	John Harris	Parliamentarian	Manaton disabled from sitting – seat vacant	
1645	John Harris	Parliamentarian	Thomas Gewen	
December 1648	Harris and Gewen excluded in Pride's Purge – both seats vacant			
1653	Launceston was unrepresented in the Barebones Parliament			
1654	Robert Bennet		Launceston had only one seat in the First and Second Parliaments of the Protectorate	
1656	Thomas Gewen		Launceston had only one seat in the First and Second Parliaments of the Protectorate	
January 1659	Thomas Gewen		Robert Bennet	
May 1659	Not represented in the restored Rump			
April 1660	Edward Eliot		Thomas Gewen	
June 1660	John Cloberry		Thomas Gewen	
1661	Richard Edgcumbe		Sir Charles Harbord	
February 1679	Bernard Granville		Sir Charles Harbord	
September 1679	Sir John Coryton		Sir Hugh Piper	
1680	Lord Lansdowne		Sir Hugh Piper	
1681	William Harbord		Sir Hugh Piper	
1685	John Granville		Sir Hugh Piper	
1689	William Harbord		Edward Russell	Whig
1690	William Harbord		Bernard Granville	
1692	Lord Hyde	Tory	Bernard Granville	
1695	Lord Hyde	Tory	William Cary	Tory
1710	Lord Hyde	Tory	Francis Scobell	Tory
1711	George Clarke		Francis Scobell	Tory
1713	Edward Herle		John Anstis	
1721	Alexander Pendarves	Tory	John Anstis	
1722	Alexander Pendarves	Tory	John Freind	
1724	Alexander Pendarves	Tory	John Willes	
1725	John Freind		John Willes	
1726	John Freind		Henry Vane	Whig
1727	Hon. John King		Arthur Tremayne	
1734	Hon. John King		Sir William Morice	Tory
1735	Sir William Irby		Sir William Morice	Tory
1747	Sir John St Aubyn	Tory	Sir William Morice	Tory
1750	Sir John St Aubyn	Tory	Humphry Morice	Whig
1754	Sir George Lee		Humphry Morice	Whig
1758	Sir John St Aubyn	Tory	Humphry Morice	Whig
1759	Peter Burrell		Humphry Morice	Whig
1768	William Amherst		Humphry Morice	Whig
1774	John Buller		Humphry Morice	Whig
September 1780	Viscount Cranborne		Thomas Bowlby	
November 1780	Hon. Charles Perceval	Tory	Thomas Bowlby	
1783	Hon. Charles Perceval	Tory	Sir John Jervis	Whig
1784	Hon. Charles Perceval	Tory	George Rose	Tory
1788	Hon. Charles Perceval	Tory	Sir John Swinburne, Bt	
1790	Hon. John Rodney	Tory	Sir Henry Clinton	Tory
1795	Hon. John Rodney	Tory	William Garthshore	Tory
1796	Hon. John Rawdon	Tory	James Brogden	Tory
1802	Richard Bennet	Whig	James Brogden	Tory
1806	Earl Percy	Tory	James Brogden	Tory
1807	Captain Richard Bennet	Whig	James Brogden	Tory
May 1812	Jonathan Raine		James Brogden	Tory
October 1812	Pownoll Pellew	Tory	James Brogden	Tory
1830	Sir James Gordon	Tory	James Brogden	Tory
1831	Sir John Malcolm	Tory	James Brogden	Tory
1832	Representation reduced to one member			

==== MPs 1832–1885 ====
Election	Member	Party
1832	Sir Henry Hardinge	Conservative
1844 by-election	William Bowles	Conservative
1852	Hon. Josceline Percy	Conservative
1859	Thomas Chandler Haliburton	Conservative
1865	Alexander Henry Campbell	Conservative
1868 by-election	Henry Lopes	Conservative
February 1874	James Deakin (senior)	Conservative
July 1874 by-election	James Deakin (junior)	Conservative
1877 by-election	Sir Hardinge Giffard	Conservative
July 1885 by-election	Richard Webster	Conservative
1885	Borough abolished; name transferred to county constituency	

=== North-Eastern or Launceston Division of Cornwall ===
==== MPs 1885–1918 ====
Election	Member	Party	Notes
1885	Thomas Dyke-Acland	Liberal	Member for East Cornwall (1882–1885)
1892	Thomas Owen	Liberal	Died July 1898
1898 by-election	John Moulton	Liberal	
1906	George Marks	Liberal	
1916	George Marks	Coalition Liberal	Contested North Cornwall following redistribution
1918	Constituency abolished		

== Elections ==
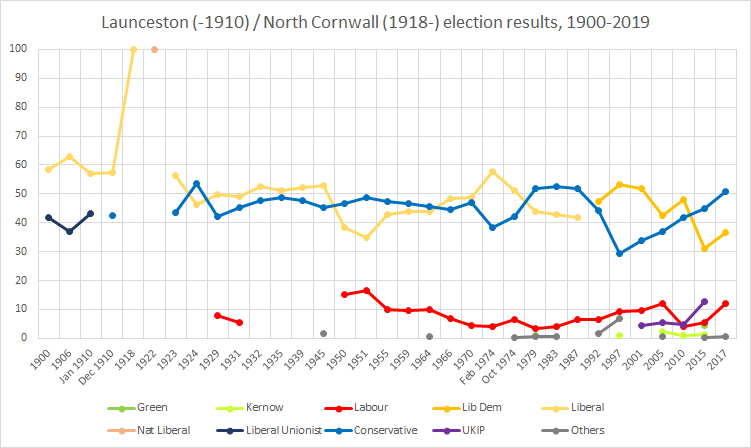
North Cornwall electoral history

=== Elections in the 1830s ===
General election 1830: Launceston
Party	Candidate	Votes	%
Tory	James Brogden	Unopposed	
Tory	James Willoughby Gordon	Unopposed	
Tory hold			
Tory hold			

Gordon resigned, causing a by-election.

By-election, 9 April 1831: Launceston
Party	Candidate	Votes	%
Tory	John Malcolm	Unopposed	
Tory hold			

General election 1831: Launceston
Party	Candidate	Votes	%
Tory	James Brogden	Unopposed	
Tory	John Malcolm	Unopposed	
Registered electors		c. 17	
Tory hold			
Tory hold			

General election 1832: Launceston
Party	Candidate	Votes	%
Tory	Henry Hardinge	115	51.6
Whig	David Howell	108	48.4
Majority		7	3.2
Turnout		223	91.8
Registered electors		243	
Tory hold			

General election 1835: Launceston
Party	Candidate	Votes	%	±%
Conservative	Henry Hardinge	163	66.0	+14.4
Whig	David Howell	84	34.0	−14.4
Majority		79	32.0	+28.8
Turnout		247	76.5	−15.3
Registered electors		323		
Conservative hold		Swing	+14.4	

General election 1837: Launceston
Party	Candidate	Votes	%	±%
Conservative	Henry Hardinge	Unopposed		
Registered electors		353		
Conservative hold				

=== Elections in the 1840s ===
General election 1841: Launceston
Party	Candidate	Votes	%	±%
Conservative	Henry Hardinge	Unopposed		
Registered electors		342		
Conservative hold				

Hardinge was appointed Secretary at War, requiring a by-election.

By-election, 15 September 1841: Launceston
Party	Candidate	Votes	%	±%
Conservative	Henry Hardinge	Unopposed		
Conservative hold				

Hardinge resigned after being appointed Governor-General of India, causing a by-election.

By-election, 20 May 1844: Launceston
Party	Candidate	Votes	%	±%
Conservative	William Bowles	Unopposed		
Conservative hold				

General election 1847: Launceston
Party	Candidate	Votes	%	±%
Conservative	William Bowles	Unopposed		
Registered electors		369		
Conservative hold				

=== Elections in the 1850s ===
General election 1852: Launceston
Party	Candidate	Votes	%	±%
Conservative	Josceline Percy	Unopposed		
Registered electors		361		
Conservative hold				

General election 1857: Launceston
Party	Candidate	Votes	%	±%
Conservative	Josceline Percy	Unopposed		
Registered electors		438		
Conservative hold				

General election 1859: Launceston
Party	Candidate	Votes	%	±%
Conservative	Thomas Chandler Haliburton	Unopposed		
Registered electors		438		
Conservative hold				

=== Elections in the 1860s ===
General election 1865: Launceston
Party	Candidate	Votes	%	±%
Conservative	Alexander Henry Campbell	Unopposed		
Registered electors		371		
Conservative hold				

Campbell resigned, causing a by-election.

1868 Launceston by-election
Party	Candidate	Votes	%	±%
Conservative	Henry Lopes	Unopposed		
Conservative hold				

General election 1868: Launceston
Party	Candidate	Votes	%	±%
Conservative	Henry Lopes	Unopposed		
Registered electors		749		
Conservative hold				

=== Elections in the 1870s ===
General election 1874: Launceston
Party	Candidate	Votes	%	±%
Conservative	James Deakin (senior)	453	67.7	N/A
Liberal	Henry Charles Drinkwater	216	32.3	New
Majority		237	35.4	N/A
Turnout		669	84.7	N/A
Registered electors		790		
Conservative hold		Swing	N/A	

The election was declared void on petition, due to corrupt practices including Deakin allowing his tenants to "kill rabbits the eve of the election", causing a by-election.

1874 Launceston by-election
Party	Candidate	Votes	%	±%
Conservative	James Deakin (junior)	417	64.1	−3.6
Liberal	John Dingley	233	35.8	+3.5
Conservative	Hardinge Giffard	1	0.2	N/A
Majority		184	28.3	−7.1
Turnout		651	82.4	−2.3
Registered electors		790		
Conservative hold		Swing	-3.5	

Deakin's resignation caused a by-election.

1877 Launceston by-election
Party	Candidate	Votes	%	±%
Conservative	Hardinge Giffard	392	58.9	−8.8
Liberal	Robert Collier	274	41.1	+8.8
Majority		118	17.8	−16.6
Turnout		666	80.6	−4.1
Registered electors		826		
Conservative hold		Swing	-8.8	

=== Elections in the 1880s ===
General election 1880: Launceston
Party	Candidate	Votes	%	±%
Conservative	Hardinge Giffard	439	56.8	−10.9
Liberal	Robert Collier	334	43.2	+10.9
Majority		105	13.6	−21.8
Turnout		773	91.8	+7.1
Registered electors		842		
Conservative hold		Swing	-10.9	

Giffard resigned upon his appointment as Lord Chancellor and elevation to the peerage, becoming Lord Halsbury, causing a by-election.

1885 Launceston by-election
Party	Candidate	Votes	%	±%
Conservative	Richard Webster	417	52.7	−4.1
Liberal	William Pethick	374	47.3	+4.1
Majority		43	5.4	−8.2
Turnout		791	92.7	+0.9
Registered electors		853		
Conservative hold		Swing	-4.1	

General election 1885: Launceston
Party	Candidate	Votes	%	±%
Liberal	Thomas Dyke Acland	4,690	64.4	+21.2
Conservative	Thomas Northmore Lawrence	2,587	35.6	−21.2
Majority		2,103	28.8	N/A
Turnout		7,277	78.3	−3.5
Registered electors		9,297		
Liberal gain from Conservative		Swing	+21.2	

General election 1886: Launceston
Party	Candidate	Votes	%	±%
Liberal	Thomas Dyke Acland	Unopposed		
Liberal hold				

=== Elections in the 1890s ===
Thomas Owen

General election 1892: Launceston
Party	Candidate	Votes	%	±%
Liberal	Thomas Owen	3,897	57.2	N/A
Liberal Unionist	Lewis Molesworth	2,913	42.8	New
Majority		984	14.4	N/A
Turnout		6,810	74.2	N/A
Registered electors		9,178		
Liberal hold		Swing	N/A	

General election 1895: Launceston
Party	Candidate	Votes	%	±%
Liberal	Thomas Owen	3,633	55.0	−2.2
Liberal Unionist	Frederick Wills	2,975	45.0	+2.2
Majority		658	10.0	−4.4
Turnout		6,608	70.1	−4.1
Registered electors		9,423		
Liberal hold		Swing	-2.2	

1898 Launceston by-election
Party	Candidate	Votes	%	±%
Liberal	John Fletcher Moulton	3,951	58.0	+3.0
Liberal Unionist	Frederick Wills	2,863	42.0	−3.0
Majority		1,088	16.0	+6.0
Turnout		6,814	71.7	+1.6
Registered electors		9,508		
Liberal hold		Swing	+3.0	

=== Elections in the 1900s ===
Moulton

General election 1900: Launceston
Party	Candidate	Votes	%	±%
Liberal	John Fletcher Moulton	3,831	58.3	+3.3
Liberal Unionist	Foster Cunliffe	2,737	41.7	−3.3
Majority		1,094	16.6	+6.6
Turnout		6,568	68.3	−1.8
Registered electors		9,616		
Liberal hold		Swing	+3.3	

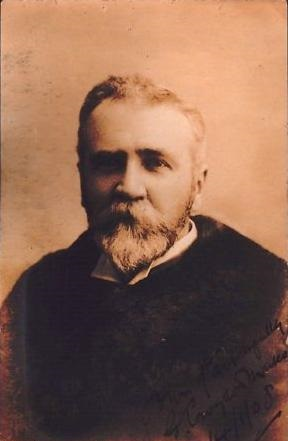
Marks

General election 1906: Launceston
Party	Candidate	Votes	%	±%
Liberal	George Marks	4,658	63.0	+4.7
Liberal Unionist	George Sandys	2,736	37.0	−4.7
Majority		1,922	26.0	+9.4
Turnout		7,394	75.0	+6.7
Registered electors		9,858		
Liberal hold		Swing	+4.7	

=== Elections in the 1910s ===
General election January 1910: Launceston
Party	Candidate	Votes	%	±%
Liberal	George Marks	4,703	56.9	−6.1
Liberal Unionist	Horace Bere Grylls	3,564	43.1	+6.1
Majority		1,139	13.8	−12.2
Turnout		8,267	83.9	+8.9
Liberal hold		Swing	-6.1	

General election December 1910: Launceston
Party	Candidate	Votes	%	±%
Liberal	George Marks	4,373	57.4	+0.5
Conservative	Edward Treffry	3,249	42.6	−0.5
Majority		1,124	14.8	+1.0
Turnout		7,622	77.3	−6.6
Liberal hold		Swing	+0.5	

General Election 1914/15:

Another General Election was required to take place before the end of 1915. The political parties had been making preparations for an election to take place and by July 1914, the following candidates had been selected;

- Liberal: George Marks
- Unionist: Edward Treffry
