= High Steward (academia) =

Largely symbolic member of a university's administration

The High Steward in the universities of Oxford and Cambridge (sometimes erroneously known as the Lord High Steward) is a university official. Originally a deputy for the chancellor, the office of High Steward had by the 18th century undergone the same evolution and become a position by which the universities honoured prominent external figures. The High Stewards still retain some functions relating to adjudication in disputes, appeals, and deputizing if there is a vacancy in the chancellorship. At Oxford, the position is currently held by the president of the Supreme Court of the United Kingdom. The office of Oxford High Steward is now more similar to the office of Commissary at Cambridge.

In Cambridge, the High Steward is elected by the members of the University Senate voting in person, one of that body's few remaining functions, and holds office until voluntarily resigning or until the Senate otherwise determines. The Deputy High Steward is appointed by the High Steward by letters patent. The High Steward and the Deputy High Steward perform "such duties as have heretofore been customary and any duties prescribed by Statute or Ordinance". When the office of High Steward is vacant the duties of that office are performed by the Deputy High Steward.

In Oxford, the High Steward is appointed by the chancellor of the university. The High Steward, in turn, "may appoint a person of distinction to hold the honorary office of Deputy Steward."

Several High Stewards were subsequently appointed Lord Chancellor, Lord Great Chamberlain or prime minister, including: Thomas More, Thomas Cromwell, Christopher Hatton, William Pitt the Younger, Philip Yorke, and John Copley.

== High Stewards of the University of Cambridge ==
- Lopham, Thomas 1418
- Harcourt, Robert (1446–1471)
- Bray, Sir Reginald, before 1503
- Empson, Sir Richard1504
- Mordaunt, Sir John 1504
- Ormston, Sir Roger 1504
- Lovell, Sir Thomas 1509
- Winkfield/Wingfield, Sir Richard 1524
- More, Sir Thomas 1525
- Blount, William, Lord Mountjoy 1529
- Cromwell, Thomas 1534 **
- Howard, Thomas, Duke of Norfolk (1554) 1540
- William Paget, 1st Baron Paget (1554–1563)
- Dudley, Robert, Earl of Leicester 1563
- Hatton, Christopher, Sir 1588
- Cecil, Robert, Sir (Earl of Salisbury, 1605) 1591 **
- Howard, Thomas (Earl of Suffolk, 1603) 1601 **
- Coke, Edward, Sir 1614
- Montagu, Henry, Earl of Manchester 1634
- Craven, William, Earl of Craven 1667
- Montagu Charles, Earl of Manchester 1697
- Arthur Annesley, 5th Earl of Anglesey (1722–37)
- Thomas Pelham-Holles, 1st Duke of Newcastle (1737–42)
- Thomas Wriothesley, 1st Earl of Southampton (1742–49)
- Philip Yorke, 1st Earl of Hardwicke (1749–64)
- Philip Yorke, 2nd Earl of Hardwicke (1764–90)
- William Pitt the Younger (1790–1806)
- Philip Yorke, 3rd Earl of Hardwicke (1806–34)
- Hugh Percy, 3rd Duke of Northumberland (1834–40) **
- John Copley, 1st Baron Lyndhurst (1840–1863)
- Edward Herbert, 3rd Earl of Powis (1863–91)
- Thomas de Grey, 6th Baron Walsingham (1891–1919)
- Robert Windsor-Clive, 1st Earl of Plymouth (1919–23)
- Victor Cavendish, 9th Duke of Devonshire (1923–38)
- Edward Cavendish, 10th Duke of Devonshire (1938–50)
- Viscount Ruffside (1951–58)
- Rab Butler, Lord Butler of Saffron Walden (1958–66)
- Lord Devlin (1966–91)
- Lord Runcie (1991–2001)
- Dame Bridget Ogilvie (2001–2009)
- Lord Watson of Richmond (2010– )

** Elected Chancellor of Cambridge University

== High Stewards of the University of Oxford ==
- John de la Pole, 2nd Duke of Suffolk 1472 (died 1492)
- Sir William Stonor 1492 (died 1494)
- Sir Reginald Bray 1494 (died 1503)
- Sir Thomas Lovell (died 1524)
- Sir Thomas More 1524 (died 1535)
- John Russell, 1st Earl of Bedford 1542–1555 (died 1555)
- Henry Fitzalan, 12th Earl of Arundel 1555–1559
- John Lumley, 1st Baron Lumley 1559–1609 (died 1609)
- Henry Howard, 1st Earl of Northampton 1609–1614 (died 1614)
- Philip Herbert, 4th Earl of Pembroke 1615–1641
- William Fiennes, 1st Viscount Saye and Sele 1641–43, 1646–50
- George Digby, 2nd Earl of Bristol 1643–1646
- John Egerton, 2nd Earl of Bridgewater 1663–1686 (died 1686)
- Henry Hyde, 2nd Earl of Clarendon 1686–1709 (died 1709)
- Laurence Hyde, 1st Earl of Rochester 1709–1711 (died 1711)
- Henry Hyde, 4th Earl of Clarendon 1711–1753 (died 1753)
- John Fane, 7th Earl of Westmorland 1754–1762 (died 1762)
- Hamilton Boyle, 6th Earl of Cork 1762–1764 (1730–1764)
- Edward Leigh, 5th Baron Leigh 1767–1786 (died 1786)
- William Legge, 2nd Earl of Dartmouth 1788–1801 (died 1801)
- John Scott, 1st Earl of Eldon 1801–1838 (died 1838)
- William Courtenay, 10th Earl of Devon 1838–1859 (died 1859)
- Henry Herbert, 4th Earl of Carnarvon 1859–1890
- Roundell Palmer, 1st Earl of Selborne 1891–1895
- Hardinge Giffard, 1st Earl of Halsbury 1896–1921
- Frederick Smith, 1st Earl of Birkenhead 1922–1930
- John Sankey, 1st Viscount Sankey 1930–1948
- John Simon, 1st Viscount Simon 1948–1954
- Gavin Simonds, 1st Viscount Simonds 1954–1967
- Richard Wilberforce, Baron Wilberforce 1967–1990
- Robert Goff, Baron Goff of Chieveley 1991–2001
- Tom Bingham, Baron Bingham of Cornhill 2001–2008
- Alan Rodger, Baron Rodger of Earlsferry 2008–2011
- Simon Brown, Baron Brown of Eaton-under-Heywood 2011–2012
- Jonathan Mance, Baron Mance 2012–2018
- Robert Reed, Baron Reed of Allermuir 2018–present
