= Thomas Owen (Launceston MP) =

British businessman and Liberal MP

Member of Parliament for Launceston
- In office 4 July 1892 – 10 July 1898
- Preceded by: Sir Thomas Dyke Acland
- Succeeded by: John Fletcher Moulton

Personal details
- Born: 15 September 1840
- Died: 10 July 1898 (aged 57)
- Party: Liberal

Thomas Owen (15 September 1840 – 10 July 1898) was a British Liberal politician who represented Launceston, Cornwall in the House of Commons from 1892 until his death in 1898. He was half-brother to Owen Owen, who built up a substantial drapery enterprise in Liverpool.

== Business ==
In 1873, Thomas Owen and his uncle Samuel Evans (1817-1885) provided substantial financial backing for Albert Edwin Reed to buy the Trevarno Paper Mill at Bathford. By that stage, Thomas Owen and Samuel Evans were partners in a successful drapery business in Bath. In 1877, Evans and Owen bought the Ely Paper Mills in Cardiff, and appointed Albert Reed as manager of those works. Evans and Owen also purchased Paper Mills at Ripponden, near Halifax, and at Ramsdunk in the Netherlands.

Samuel Evans died 25 April 1885, and Thomas Owen then became the sole partner in the Messrs. Evans and Owen enterprise. The assets of the drapery business were converted into a limited liability company (authorized capital of 100,000 pounds) in September 1889, with Thomas Owen as chairman, his half-brother Owen Owen of Liverpool as a director, and W. Tonkin as managing director. The Ely Paper Mills were converted into a limited liability company ("Thomas Owen and Company Ltd") in March 1892, with Thomas Owen as chairman; and six other "first directors" including his eldest son Charles Todd Owen (1870-1941), and Robert William Perks.

== Political career ==
Owen became a Liberal MP for Launceston in 1892, and in 1898 died in office.
