= Ditchers =

The Ditchers or Diehards were groupings of British nobility, who had decided to take a "last-ditch" stand against the Liberal government's reforms to the constitution.

== History ==
=== Background ===
In 1910, Liberal Prime Minister H. H. Asquith introduced the Parliament Bill, which would have removed the House of Lords' right to permanently block Bills coming up from the House of Commons. The Bill repeatedly passed the Commons by a large majority, but remained stalled in the House of Lords, which was largely made up of Conservatives and had no intention of seeing its powers reduced.

In order to force through the passage of the bill, Asquith asked King George V to create enough Liberal peers to give supporters of the draft law a majority in the House of Lords. The King agreed, but stated he would have done so only if the Lords rejected the Bill another time. In the aftermath of this new announcement, those who had until then opposed the bill divided in two factions: the hedgers and the ditchers or die-hards.

=== Hedgers ===
Those who reluctantly decided to vote for Asquith's proposal were called "hedgers", a term used to define investors who "play it safe" and avoid risk as much as possible. They believed that voting for the bill (even though they did not support it) was worth if it meant avoiding the mass appointment of Liberal peers, which would have caused Conservative peers to lose any semblance political influence, and turn the upper chamber into rubber stamp for Liberal governments. They reasoned that the bill was going to pass regardless of whether they would have voted in favour or against: had the bill been voted down by the Lords, the Government would have simply followed through on its threat and appointed enough Liberal peers to pass it.

=== Ditchers ===
Those who decided to take a principled stand against the Bill, feeling unable to vote for something they did not truly support, were called "last ditchers" or "die-hards". This latter category was mostly made up of Tory farmers, landowners, and aristocracy, who were staunchly opposed to all social 'equalitarian' reforms limiting the privileges of the Nobility.

=== Passage of the bill ===
The Parliament Bill passed in the House of Lords on 11 August 1911 with 131 votes in favor and 114 against; it was enacted as the Parliament Act 1911 shortly thereafter.
