= HMS Madras =

Several ships that have served the Royal Navy have borne the name HMS Madras for Madras:

- HMS Madras (1795) was laid down as Lascelles, an East Indiaman being built for the British East India Company. The Royal Navy purchased her on the stocks and had her completed as a 56-gun fourth rate. She was launched as HMS Madras in 1795. She was broken up at Malta in 1807.
- HMS Madras, of 80 guns, was laid down at Bombay in 1842 but renamed HMS Meeanee in 1846 before her launching in 1848. She was converted to a screw warship in 1856. She became a hospital ship in Hong Kong in 1867 and was sold for breaking up in 1906.
- HMRIM Madras was launched in 1876 as a wood paddle tugboat for the Royal Indian Marine.
- HMS Madras was a Castle-class naval trawler built in Bombay in 1919. She may have been laid up in 1942 and renamed or sold in 1943.

== See also ==
- HMIS Madras was a Bathurst-class minesweeper that served in the Royal Indian Navy during the Second World War.
