= James Henry Deakin (politician, born 1823) =

James Henry Deakin MP

Member of Parliament for Launceston
- In office 9 February 1874 – 6 May 1874
- Preceded by: Henry Lopes
- Succeeded by: James Henry Deakin (junior)

Personal details
- Born: 2 March 1823
- Died: 23 September 1880 (aged 57) Moseley Park, Cheadle, Cheshire
- Party: Conservative

Colonel James Henry Deakin (2 March 1823 – 23 September 1880) was a British Conservative Party politician and brewer.

He was elected MP for Launceston in the 1874 general election but was unseated just under three months later after an election petition, owing to corruption, including allowing his tenants to "kill rabbits the eve of the election", causing a by-election. His son James Henry Deakin (junior) was elected in his place at the ensuing by-election.

In 1871, Deakin bought the Werrington manor from County Wicklow MP William Wentworth FitzWilliam Dick, selling off much of the land and properties of the estate. In 1882, the manor and its lands were then purchased by John Charles Williams.

Deakin was an Honorary Colonel of the 33rd Lancashire Volunteers.

Parliament of the United Kingdom
Preceded by Henry Lopes	Member of Parliament for Launceston; February 1874–May 1874	Succeeded by James Henry Deakin (junior)
