= Stanley Lees Giffard =

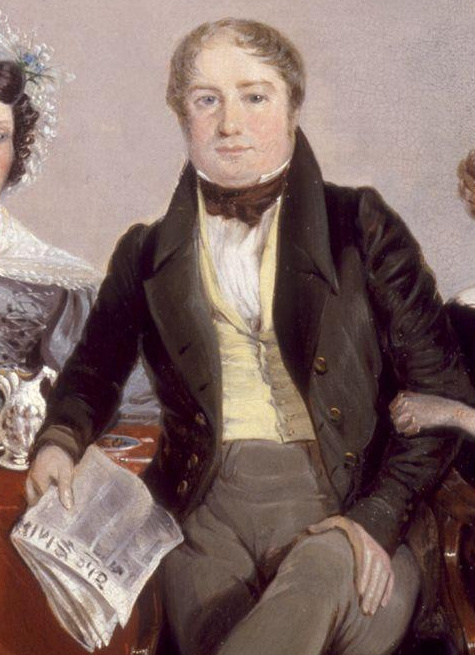
- Born: 1788; Dublin, Ireland
- Died: November 1858 (aged 69–70)
- Education: Trinity College, Dublin
- Occupations: barrister, journalist and editor
- Known for: founder of The Standard
- Spouses: Susanna Meares Moran; May Ann Giffard
- Children: 9, including Hardinge Stanley Giffard the 1st Earl of Halsbury

Stanley Lees Giffard (1788 – November 1858) was founder and first editor of a London newspaper, The Standard.

== Biography ==
Born in Dublin, Stanley Lees Giffard was the son of John Giffard and Sarah Morton of Dromartin Castle. His brother Ambrose Hardinge Giffard served as Chief Justice of Ceylon. His father, a Captain in the Dublin Militia, became Accountant-General of Customs and High Sheriff of the County of Dublin.

Stanley Giffard was educated at Trinity College, Dublin, and became a barrister. He was later awarded an honorary degree of Doctor of Law (LL.D.).

His first marriage, in 1814, was to Susanna Meares Moran, daughter of Francis Moran, a justice of the peace in Ireland. His second marriage, in 1830, was to Mary Ann Giffard, daughter of a Lieutenant in the Royal Navy. The children of his first marriage were John Walter de Longueville Giffard, Reverend Francis Osbern Giffard, Hardinge Stanley Giffard the 1st Earl of Halsbury, Sara Lees Giffard, and Susanna Giffard. From his second marriage, he had Henry Stanley Giffard, Richard Plantagenet Giffard, Katharine Lippencott Giffard, and Mary Lees Fane Giffard.
