= John Greville (died 1444) =

Member of the Parliament of England

Arms of Greville: Sable, on a cross engrailed or five pellets a bordure engrailed of the second

John Greville (died 30 September 1444) was a Member of Parliament for Gloucestershire in seven parliaments.

== Life ==
He was one of the six sons of William Greville (d.1401), of Chipping Campden in Gloucestershire, "the flower of the wool-merchants of all England", the leading purchaser of wool from the Cotswold Hills at that time. Although he began his career as a wool merchant, the Grevilles were in the process of acquiring gentry status and his own standing was increased by his first marriage to a wealthy heiress. Between 1412 and 1420 his income from land increased from £20 to £74.

By 1403 he was involved in local administration, and by his death had served 3 terms as sheriff, 4 as escheator and over two decades as a justice of the peace. He was elected to represent Gloucestershire in 7 parliaments: April 1414, 1419, May 1421, 1422, 1423, 1425 and 1427).

== Marriages and children ==
He married twice:

1. Sibyl Corbet (c.1387-27 Aug. 1425), daughter and heiress of Sir Robert Corbet, of Hadley, Shropshire by whom he had no issue;
2. Joyce Cokesey (c.1406-19 July 1473), widow of Walter Beauchamp, Knt., of Brewham, Somerset, and daughter of Walter Cokesey, of Great Cooksey, Worcestershire, and the sister and heiress of Sir Hugh Cokesey. After her husband's death in 1444, Joyce married (3rd) Leonard Stapleton, Esq.

His children, by his second wife Joyce, included:

- John Greville (died 1480). He was Lord of the Manor of Hunningham. This John Greville succeeded to the vast Cokesay estates upon the death his mother Joyce.
- Maurice Greville.

== Death and succession ==
He was buried in All Saints' Church, Weston-on-Avon and was succeeded by his son John Greville (died 1480).
