= John Cokeworthy I =

English politician

John Cokeworthy (fl. 1377–1399) was an English politician.

He was a Member (MP) of the Parliament of England for Liskeard in January 1377 and January 1390, Launceston in October 1377, January 1380, 1381, May 1382, October 1382, October 1383, April 1384, November 1384, 1385, 1386, February 1388, January 1390, 1391, 1393, 1395, January 1397, and 1399 and Lostwithiel in 1378.
