= George Grenville (fl. 1571–1572) =

English politician

George Grenville (fl. 1571–1572) of Penheale, Cornwall, was an English politician.

He was a member (MP) of the parliament of England for Dunheved in 1571 and 1572. His nephew, George Grenville (died 1595), was also an MP for the same constituency.
