= John Greville (died 1480) =

English nobleman

Arms of Greville: Sable, on a cross engrailed or five pellets a bordure engrailed of the second

Sir John Greville (1427, Chipping Camden – 6 August 1480, Milcote) was an English nobleman of the Greville family. His father John Greville (died 1444) served as a Member of Parliament in seven English parliaments. He succeeded to the manors of Hunningham, Tetbury and Manningford Bruce on his mother Joyce Cokesay's death in 1473.

== Marriage and issue ==
He married Joan Scote (b. 1429) in 1449 and with her he had three children:

- Sir Thomas Greville alias Cokesey (1452 – 6 March 1498)
- Margaret Greville (b. 1454)

== Sources ==
- George Edward Cokayne, The Complete Peerage of England, Scotland, Ireland, Great Britain and the United Kingdom, Extant, Extinct, or Dormant (London: St. Catherine Press, 1910.), 6:181a, Los Angeles Public Library, 929.721 C682.
- George Ormerod, The History of the County Palatine and City of Chester (London: Lackington, Hughes, Mavor & Jones, 1819.), 2:599, Family History Library, 942.71 H2or.
- Joseph Edmondson, An Historical and Genealogical Account of the Noble Family of Greville (London: J. Edmonson, 1766.), pp. 4–5, Family History Library, 929.242 G869e.
- Collectanea Topographica et Genealogica (London: J.B. Nichols, 1834–1843. FHL BRITISH Film #496,953 Item 3.), 6:74, Family History Library
- Egerton Brydges, Collins's Peerage of England (London: T. Bensley, 1812.), 4:332-3, Family History Library, 942 D22be.
- Egerton Brydges, Collins's Peerage, 4:333.
- Paul Walton Mackenzie, "The Ancestry of Sir Thomas Cokesey" website https://archive.org/details/theancestryofsirthomascokesey/page/n9/mode/1up
