= James Henry Deakin (politician, born 1851) =

James Henry Deakin (1851 – 8 November 1881) was a British Conservative politician, the son of Col. James Henry Deakin, a Manchester merchant.

In 1874 he was elected Member of Parliament for Launceston at a by-election, after his father's election had been nullified due to the use of corrupt practices. He resigned in 1877.

Parliament of the United Kingdom
Preceded by James Henry Deakin	Member of Parliament for Launceston; 1874–1877	Succeeded by Sir Hardinge Giffard
