= George Grenville (died 1595) =

English politician

George Grenville (died 1595), of Penheale, Cornwall, was an English politician.

He was a member (MP) of the parliament of England for Camelford in 1572, Weymouth and Melcombe Regis in 1584 and for Dunheved in 1593. His uncle, George Grenville (fl. 1571–1572), was also an MP for Dunheved.
