= Lord Josceline Percy =

British politician and peer

Member of Parliament for Launceston
- In office 1852-1859

Personal details
- Born: 17 July 1811
- Died: 25 July 1881 (aged 70)
- Party: Conservative
- Spouse: Margaret Davidson (m. 1848)
- Parent: George Percy (father)
- Relatives: Algernon Percy (brother); Henry Percy (brother); Algernon Percy (grandfather); James Stuart-Wortley (grandfather)
- Education: St John's College, Cambridge

Lord Josceline William Percy (17 July 1811 – 25 July 1881) was a British Conservative politician.

== Background and education ==
Percy was the second son of George Percy, 5th Duke of Northumberland by his wife Louisa, daughter of the Hon. James Stuart-Wortley. Algernon Percy, 6th Duke of Northumberland was his elder brother and Lord Henry Percy his younger brother. After his father succeeded in the dukedom of Northumberland in 1865 he was styled Lord Josceline Percy.

He was educated at Eton and St John's College, Cambridge, graduating MA in 1833.

== Political career ==
Percy was elected Member of Parliament for Launceston in the 1852 general election, a seat he held until 1859.

== Family ==
Percy married Margaret, daughter of Sir David Davidson and widow of Sir Robert Grant, in 1848. He died in July 1881, aged 70. His wife died in June 1885.

Parliament of the United Kingdom
Preceded by William Bowles	Member of Parliament for Launceston; 1852–1859	Succeeded by Thomas Chandler Haliburton
