= Edward Conway =

Edward Conway may refer to:

- Edward Conway, 1st Viscount Conway (1564–1631), English soldier and statesman
- Edward Conway, 2nd Viscount Conway (died 1655), English peer
- Edward Conway, 1st Earl of Conway (c. 1623–1683), English peer and politician
- E. J. Conway (Edward Joseph Conway) (1894–1965), Irish biochemist
- Marshall Edward Conway, known as Eddie Conway (born 1946), Black Panther Party member
