= Anne Conway (philosopher) =

English philosopher (1631–1679)

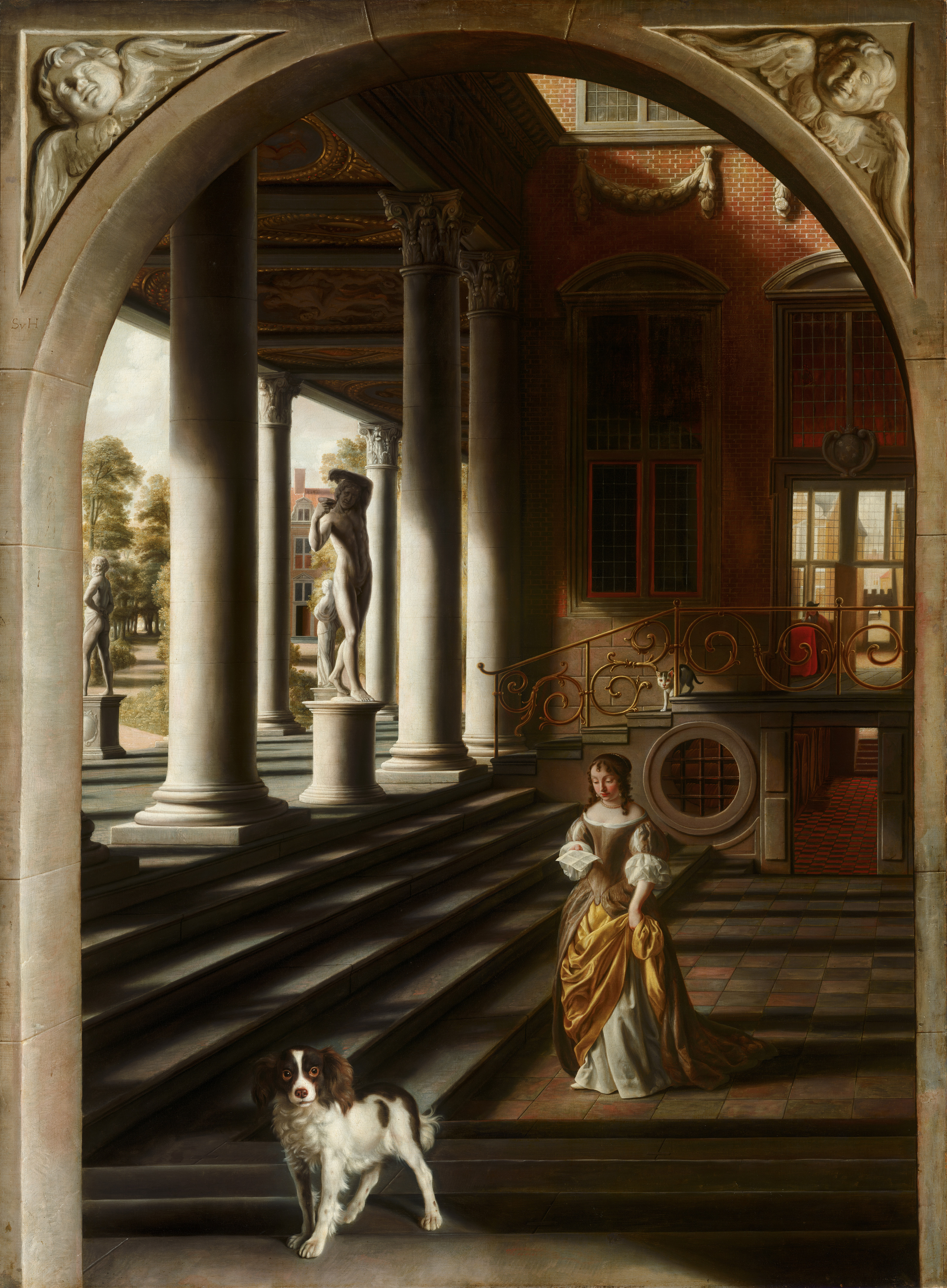
- Perspective View with a Woman Reading a Letter by Samuel van Hoogstraten. This painting is often thought to depict Anne Conway, though that attribution has been disputed.
- Born: Anne Finch; 14 December 1631; London, England
- Died: 23 February 1679 (aged 47); Ragley Hall, Warwickshire, England
- Resting place: Holy Trinity Church, Arrow, Warwickshire
- Occupation: Philosopher
- Spouse: Edward Conway, 1st Earl of Conway (after 1651)
- Children: Heneage Edward Conway
- Parent(s): Sir Heneage Finch; Elizabeth Cradock
- Relatives: John Finch (brother)

Philosophical work
- Era: 17th Century; Age of Enlightenment
- Region: Western philosophy; British philosophy
- Main interests: Metaphysics, Monism

Anne Conway (also known as Viscountess Conway; née Finch; 14 December 1631 – 23 February 1679) was an English philosopher of the seventeenth century, whose work was in the tradition of the Cambridge Platonists. Conway's thought is a deeply original form of rationalist philosophy. Conway rejected Cartesian substance dualism and instead, argued that nature is constituted by one substance. Against the mechanists, she argued that matter is not passive, but has self-motion, perception, and life.

== Life ==
Anne Finch was born to Sir Heneage Finch (who had held the posts of the Recorder of London and Speaker of the House of Commons under Charles I) and his second wife, Elizabeth (daughter of William Cradock of Staffordshire). Her father died the week before her birth. She was the youngest child. Anne grew up in the house now known as Kensington Palace, which her family owned at the time. In her younger years, she was educated by tutors. She studied Latin, and later learned Greek and Hebrew. Her half-brother, John Finch, encouraged her interests in philosophy and theology. He introduced Anne to one of his tutors at Christ's College, Cambridge, the Platonist Henry More. This led to a lifelong correspondence and close friendship between Henry and Anne. In their correspondence, the pair discussed René Descartes' philosophy. Eventually, Anne grew from More's informal pupil to his intellectual equal. When speaking about her, More said that he had "scarce ever met with any Person, Man or Woman, of better Natural parts than Lady Conway" (quoted in Richard Ward's The Life of Henry More (1710) p. 193), and that "in the knowledge of things as well Natural and Divine, you have not only out-gone all of your own Sex, but even of that other also."

In 1651, she married Edward Conway, later 1st Earl of Conway. Her husband was also interested in philosophy and had been tutored by More. Anne and Edward established their place of residence at Anne's home at Kensington Palace. In the year following her marriage, More dedicated his book Antidote against Atheism to Anne. In 1658, she gave birth to her only child, Heneage Edward Conway, who died of smallpox just two years later. Anne also contracted the illness, but managed to survive the disease.

Anne Conway contacted Elizabeth Foxcroft likely through More, and when Foxcroft's husband went to India in 1666, she moved in with Conway and became her companion and amanuensis. They shared similar interests and Foxcroft lived at Ragley Hall until 1672. Conway became interested in the Lurianic Kabbalah, and then in Quakerism. She exchanged letters with important Quaker leaders and met several of them in person. In England at that time, Quakers were generally disliked and feared, and suffered persecution and even imprisonment. Some scholars cite the parallels that she identified between Quaker beliefs and the Kabbalah as an influential factor in Conway's conversion to Quakerism.

Conway's life was marked by the recurrence of severe migraines from the age of twelve, when she suffered a period of fever. This meant that she was often incapacitated by pain, and she spent much time under medical supervision and searching for a cure, at one point even having her jugular veins opened. The extreme pain she experienced led her to pursue her philosophical studies from the comfort of her own home, and some scholars cite Conway's identification of her physical suffering with the hardships faced by Quakers as another reason for her conversion to Quakerism. She received medical advice from Dr. Thomas Willis and many others. The Conways also consulted the Swiss royal physician of the time, Theodore Turquet de Mayerne, and the natural philosopher Robert Boyle. Additionally, Conway consulted William Harvey, who was a physician and researcher of how blood circulated in the human body. Some scholars believe that in 1665, John Finch attempted to cure his sister by operating on her head. In 1666, the Conways famously persuaded Valentine Greatrakes, a renounced Irish healer, to attempt to cure her. Even though Conway was famously treated by many of the great physicians of her time, none of the treatments proved to be successful. She died in 1679 at the age of forty-seven.

== Philosophical Work ==
=== The Principles of the Most Ancient and Modern Philosophy ===
In The Principles, written around 1677, Conway develops a unique theory of substance monism and vitalism. In contrast with the Cartesian idea that bodies consist of dead matter, Conway argues that all matter has vitality and self-knowledge. She also repudiates dualist theories of the relationship between the body and spirit, claiming instead that the world consists of only one substance. A notable element of her philosophy is her emphasis on the relationship between three levels of being, which she defines as God, Christ, and "Creatures" (all life on Earth). She distinguishes between these levels of being through their capacity for change, or perfectibility. Within the category of "Creatures" Conway proposes that all life is interconnected because it essentially consists of the same substance.

Anne Conway proposes a continuous divine creation, based on God's infinite goodness and power.

The Principles was originally published in English and translated into Latin as Principia philosophiae antiquissimae et recentissimae in 1690. The English original was lost, but an English retranslation of the Latin appeared in 1692.

== Correspondence ==
Throughout her life, Conway exchanged numerous letters with Henry More, Francis Mercury van Helmont, and other major thinkers of her time. In these letters, she discussed numerous philosophical and theological concepts and occasionally wrote about personal matters, like the death of her son.

Conway also wrote around a dozen letters to her father-in-law, Lord Conway, and received around a dozen letters from her brother, John Finch. These correspondences concerned philosophy, social issues, and their personal lives. In 1930, Marjorie Hope Nicolson published Conway's correspondence along with bibliographical details about her. In 1992, Sarah Hutton published a revised, augmented edition of Nicolson's Conway Letters. Nicolson's version focuses primarily on Conway's relationships with friends and family, including an analysis of her relationship with Henry More.

== Historical Impact ==
Conway's work was an influence on Gottfried Leibniz, and Hugh Trevor-Roper called her "England's greatest female philosopher."

== Bibliography ==
- The principles of the most ancient and modern philosophy (London: n. publ., 1692) 168 pp. in 12°. – originally printed in Latin: Principia philosophiae antiquissimae et recentissimae de Deo, Christo & Creatura, Amsterdam: M. Brown 1690.
- Letters. The Correspondence of Anne, Viscountess Conway, Henry More and their friends, 1642–1684, ed. M. H. Nicolson (London 1930) 517 pp.
- The Correspondence of Anne, Viscountess Conway, Henry More and their friends, 1642–1684, Rev. ed. S. Hutton (Oxford 1992).
- Collaborations with Franciscus Mercurius van Helmont (1614–1698)
  - A Cabbalistical Dialogue (1682) (in Christian Knorr von Rosenroth, Kabbala denudata, 1677–1684)
  - Two Hundred Quiries moderately propounded concerning the Doctrine of the Revolution of Humane Souls (1684).
