= Francis Seymour-Conway, 1st Baron Conway =

British politician

- Arms of Seymour (he was not entitled to use the arms of the special grant of the 1st Duke of Somerset): Gules, two wings conjoined in lure or

Member of the English Parliament for Bramber
- In office 1701–1703 Serving with: Thomas Owen 1701–1702; John Asgill 1702–1703
- Preceded by: Thomas Stringer; Thomas Owen
- Succeeded by: John Asgill; John Middleton

Personal details
- Born: Francis Seymour; 28 May 1679
- Died: 3 February 1732 (aged 52) Lisburn, Ireland
- Party: Tory
- Spouses: Lady Mary Hyde; Jane Bowden; Charlotte Shorter
- Children: 13, including; Francis Seymour-Conway, 1st Marquess of Hertford; Henry Seymour Conway
- Parent: Sir Edward Seymour, 4th Baronet (father)

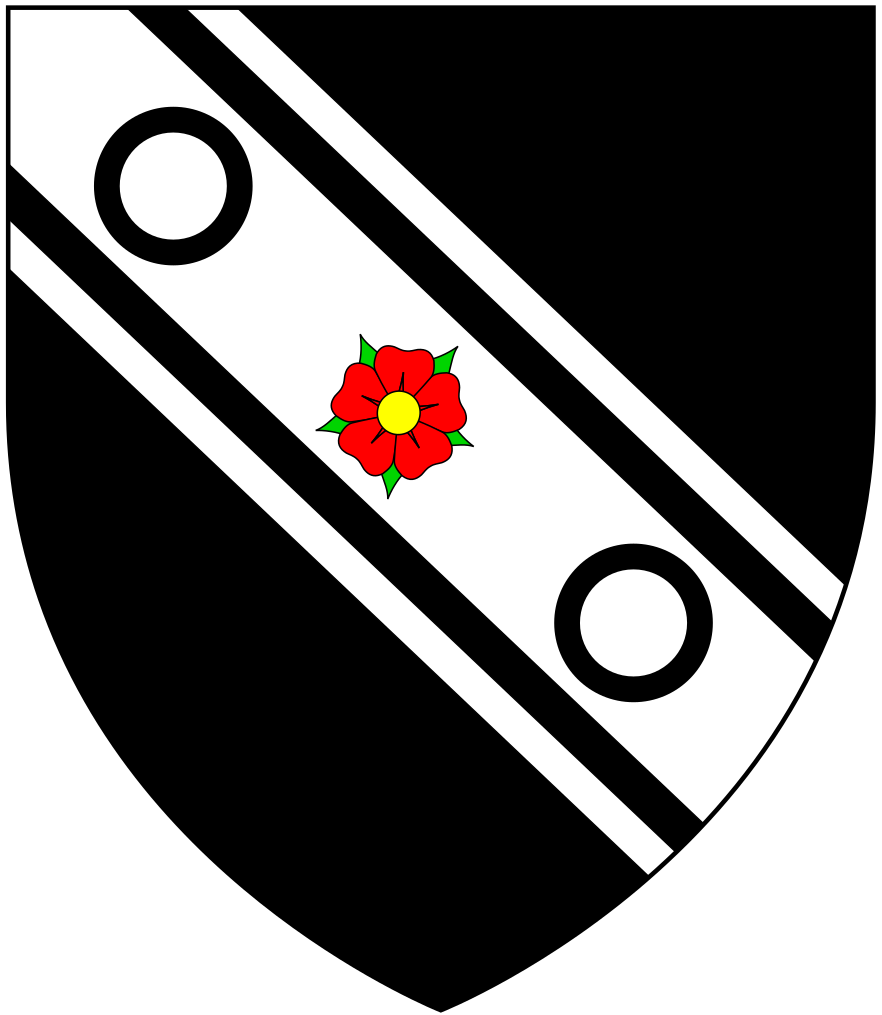
Arms of Conway: Sable, on a bend cotised argent a rose gules between two annulets of the first

Francis Seymour-Conway, 1st Baron Conway of Ragley, 1st Baron Conway of Killultagh, MP, PC (Ire) (28 May 1679 – 3 February 1731/1732), was a British politician, born Francis Seymour.

== Background ==
Born Francis Seymour, he was the second son of Sir Edward Seymour, 4th Baronet, by his second wife Letitia, daughter of Alexander Popham. This branch of the Seymour family descended from Sir Edward Seymour, son of Edward Seymour, 1st Duke of Somerset by his first wife Catherine Filliol. His nephew Sir Edward Seymour succeeded as 8th Duke of Somerset in 1750. On the death of his elder brother Popham Seymour-Conway in 1699, Francis succeeded to the estates of his mother's relative Edward Conway, 1st Earl of Conway, and assumed the same year by Royal licence the additional surname of Conway.

== Political career ==
Conway sat as Tory Member of Parliament for Bramber from 1701 to 1703. In 1703 he was raised to the Peerage of England as Baron Conway of Ragley, in the County of Warwick, and in 1712 he was created Baron Conway of Killultagh, in the County of Antrim, in the Peerage of Ireland. From 1728 to 1732 Lord Conway was Governor of Carrickfergus and was sworn of the Irish Privy Council in 1728.

== Marriages and issue ==
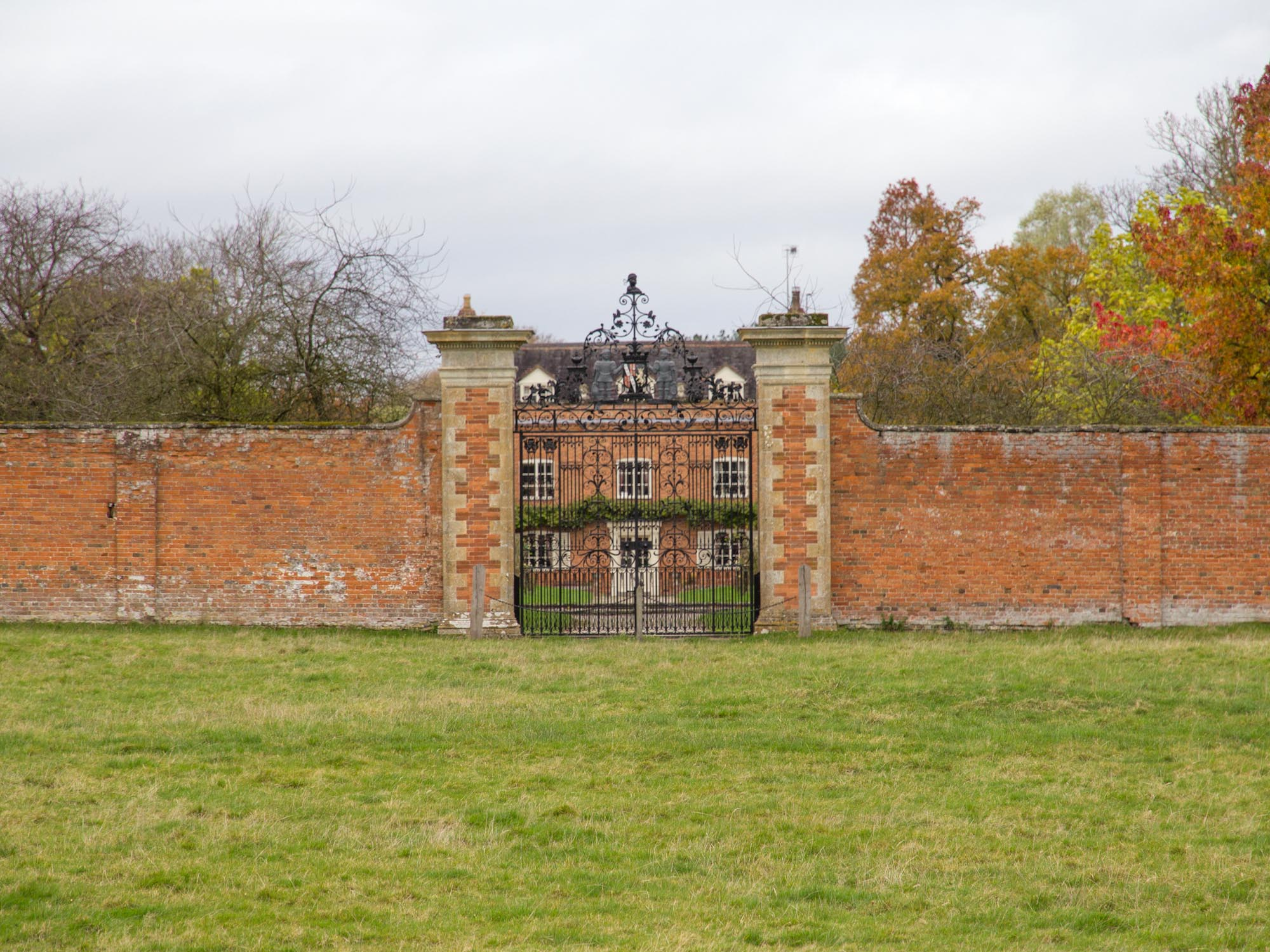
Gates at Ragley Hall displaying arms of 1st Baron Conway impaling those of his third wife Charlotte Shorter

Lord Conway married firstly Lady Mary, daughter of Laurence Hyde, 1st Earl of Rochester, on 17 February 1703/1704. They had four daughters:

- Hon. Letitia Seymour-Conway (17 October 1704 – 1723)
- Hon. Mary Seymour-Conway (August 1705 – 1728), married Nicholas Price
- Hon. Henrietta Seymour-Conway (1706 – 10 May 1771)
- Hon. Catherine Seymour-Conway (1708 – 14 June 1737)

After Lady Mary's death in Northwicke on 25 January 1708/1709 he married secondly Jane Bowden, of Drogheda, in that same year, by whom he had two children:

- Hon. Edward Seymour-Conway (d. 8 April 1710)
- Hon. Jane Seymour-Conway (d. 5 May 1749)

After Jane's death in Sandywell, Gloucestershire, on 13 February 1715/1716 he married thirdly Charlotte, daughter of John Shorter, of Bybrook, Kent, and wife, in July 1716.

- Francis Seymour-Conway, 1st Marquess of Hertford (1718–1794)
- Field Marshal Hon. Henry Seymour Conway (1721–1795)
- Hon. Charlotte Seymour-Conway (22 July 1717 – September 1717)
- Hon. George Augustus Seymour-Conway (b. August 1723), died an infant
- Hon. Arabella Seymour-Conway, died young
- Hon. Anne Seymour-Conway (d. 24 March 1774), married John Harris on 10 March 1755 and had issue
- Hon. Charles Seymour-Conway, died young

Lord Conway died in February 1732 in Lisburn, aged 52, and was succeeded by his eldest son by his third wife, Francis Seymour-Conway, who was created Earl of Hertford in 1750 and Marquess of Hertford in 1793. Lady Conway died on 12 February 1733/1734.

Parliament of England
Preceded by Thomas Stringer; Thomas Owen	Member of Parliament for Bramber; 1701–1703; With: Thomas Owen 1701–1702; John Asgill 1702–1703	Succeeded by John Asgill; John Middleton
Peerage of England
New creation	Baron Conway of Ragley; 1703–1732	Succeeded by Francis Seymour-Conway
Peerage of Ireland
New creation	Baron Conway of Killultagh; 1712–1732	Succeeded by Francis Seymour-Conway
