= Popham Seymour-Conway =

Irish politician

Arms of Seymour (he was not entitled to use the arms of the special grant of the 1st Duke of Somerset): Gules, two wings conjoined in lure or

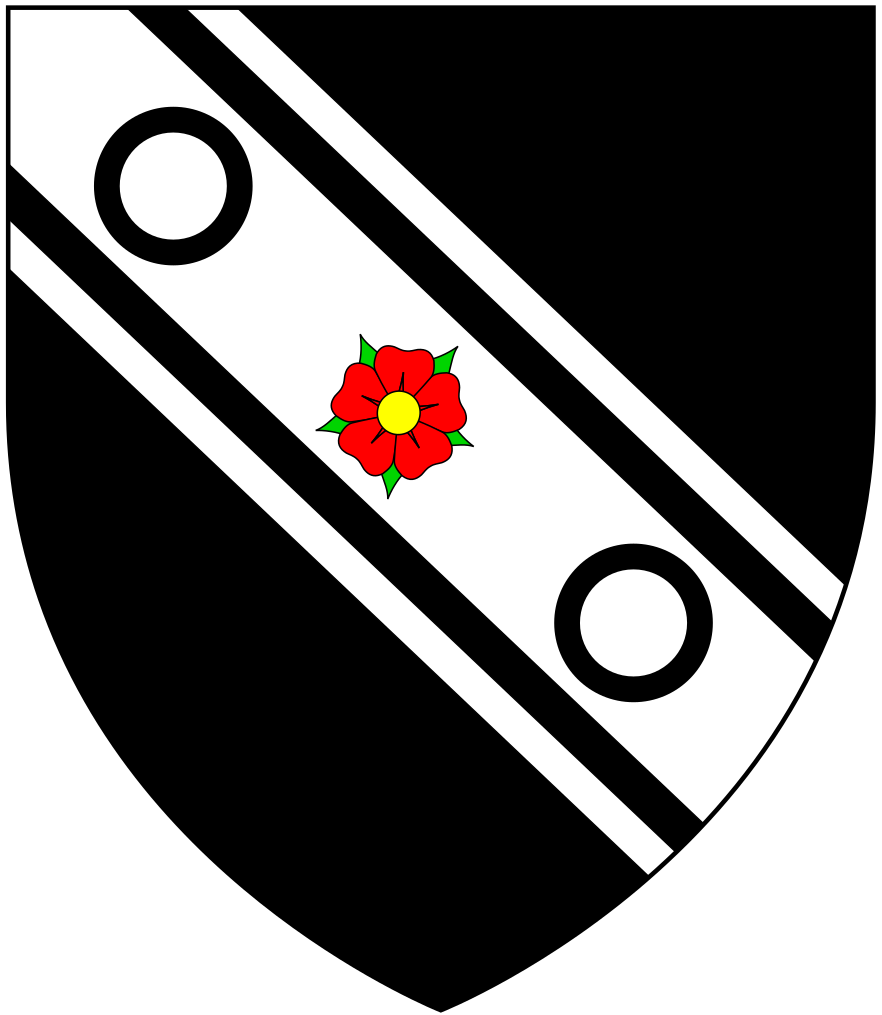
Arms of Conway: Sable, on a bend cotised argent a rose gules between two annulets of the first

Popham Seymour-Conway (1675 – 18 June 1699), born Popham Seymour, was an Anglo-Irish landowner who served as Member of the Irish Parliament for Lisburn in 1697.

== Origins ==
He was the 3rd son of Sir Edward Seymour, 4th Baronet (d.1708) of Berry Pomeroy in Devon, by his second wife Laetitia Popham (of which marriage he was the eldest son), a daughter of Alexander Popham (1605 – 1669), MP, of Littlecote in Wiltshire.

== Conway inheritance ==
On 9 August 1683 his mother's childless cousin Edward Conway, 1st Earl of Conway (c.1623-1683), bequeathed him his extensive estates in Warwickshire and Lisburn, on condition that he should change his name to Seymour-Conway and adopt the Conway arms. Considerable suspicion was aroused by this transaction, as it displaced Sir Arthur Rawdon, 2nd Baronet, Conway's nephew, from the succession. It was suspected that his father Sir Edward Seymour, 4th Baronet, had taken advantage of the Earl's senility to bring it about.

== Career ==
In 1697 Seymour-Conway became Member of Parliament for Lisburn, site of his new estates, in the Irish Parliament.

== Death by duel ==
On 4 June 1699, during a drunken duel with Captain George Kirk of the Royal Horse Guards, Seymour-Conway was wounded in the neck. He succumbed to the effects of the wound two weeks later and on 18 June died in London.

== Succession ==
The Conway estates passed to his younger brother Francis Seymour-Conway, 1st Baron Conway, who also assumed the name of Seymour-Conway and was created Baron Conway.

Parliament of Ireland
Preceded by Randal Brice; Edward Harrison	Member of Parliament for Lisburn; 1697–1699; With: Edward Harrison	Succeeded by Michael Harrison; Richard Nutley
