= Constantine Phipps (Lord Chancellor of Ireland) =

Lord Chancellor of Ireland

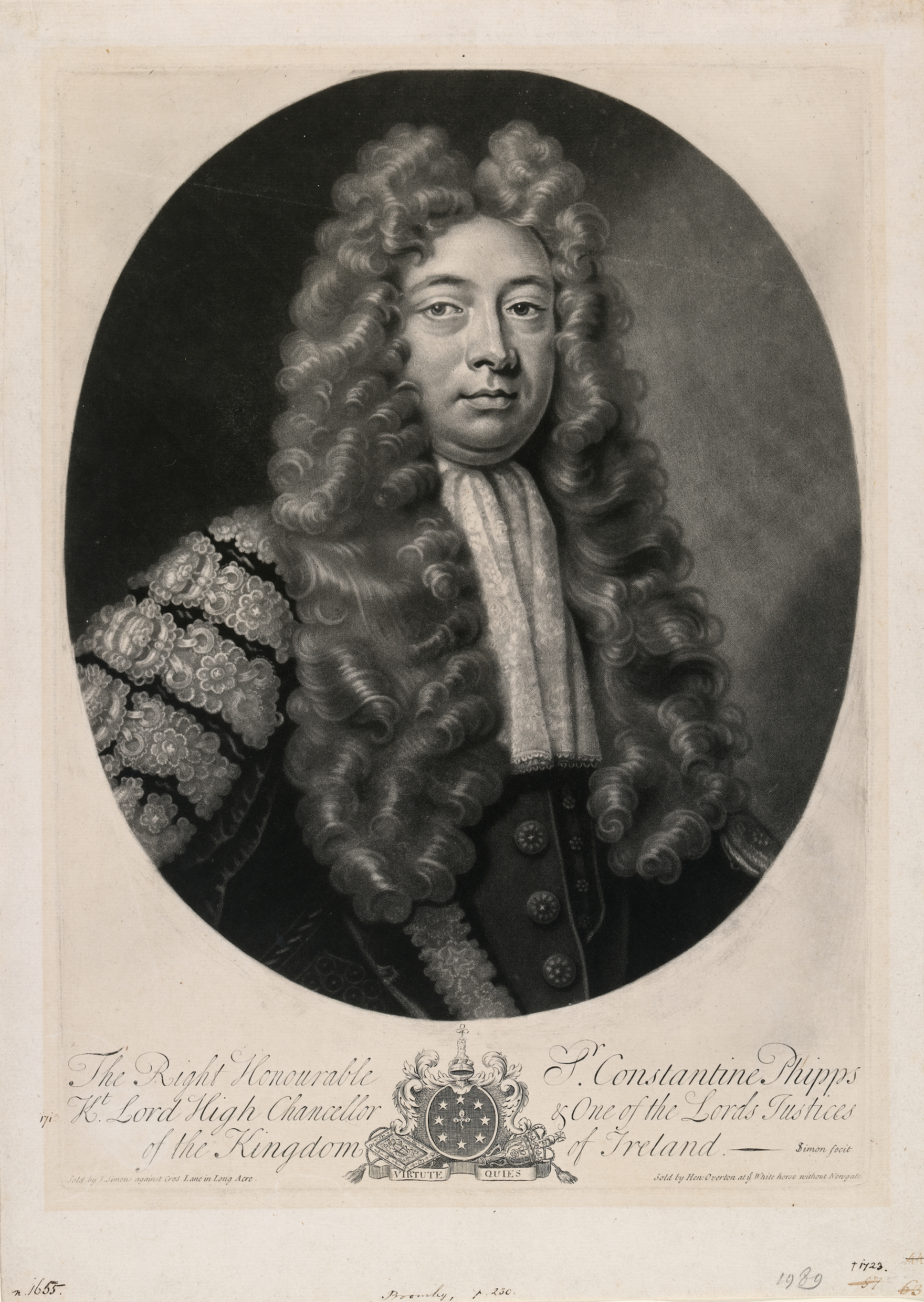

Lord Chancellor of Ireland
- In office 1710–1714

Personal details
- Born: 1656 Reading, Berkshire
- Died: 1723 (aged 66–67)
- Education: St. John's College, Oxford
- Occupation: lawyer

Sir Constantine Henry Phipps (1656–1723) was an English-born lawyer who held the office of Lord Chancellor of Ireland. His term of office was marked by bitter political faction-fighting and he faced repeated calls for his removal. His descendants held the titles Earl of Mulgrave and Marquess of Normanby. Sir William Phips, the Governor of Massachusetts 1692–94, was his first cousin.

== Early life ==
He was born in Reading, the third son of Francis Phipps and Anne Sharpe. Though they described themselves as "gentry", his family do not seem to have had much money: Constantine received a free education at Reading School. His uncle James emigrated to Maine where his numerous children, of whom the best known is his son William, the future Governor of Massachusetts, were born. Constantine won a scholarship to St. John's College, Oxford in 1672.

He was admitted to Gray's Inn in 1678 and called to the Bar in 1684. He was a lawyer of great ability: in politics, he was a strong Tory and suspected Jacobite, which harmed his career. His name became associated with politically sensitive trials: he was junior counsel for the defence in the prosecution of Sir John Fenwick for his part in the conspiracy against William III in 1696. It was his management of the defence of Henry Sacheverell, impeached for preaching an inflammatory sermon in 1710, that made his name as a barrister and caused Queen Anne to favour him.

== Lord Chancellor of Ireland ==
In 1710 Richard Freeman, the popular and respected Lord Chancellor of Ireland died of brain disease, and Phipps was chosen to succeed him. He arrived in Ireland in December and quickly became embroiled in the political controversies which were rife in Dublin at the time. He was also appointed Lord Justice of Ireland, together with Richard Ingoldsby, and was a key member of the Dublin administration. As a convinced Tory, he sought to "pack" local councils with politically reliable sheriffs and justices of the peace. In Dublin itself the results were disastrous: a Whig Lord Mayor of Dublin, Sir John Eccles, was elected but the Crown refused to recognise his election, and for two years the capital had no effective Government.

Other lesser incidents added to Phipps' unpopularity: although his good intentions need not be doubted, he showed very poor political judgment on several occasions, especially in the Dudley Moore case. For several years it had been the custom to celebrate King William III's landing at Torbay on 5 November 1688 with a performance of the play Tamerlane by Nicholas Rowe on the anniversary of the landing. In 1712 however, the Government ordered that the prologue, which was considered to be politically inflammatory, be omitted. When a young gentleman called Dudley Moore went on stage to read it a scuffle broke out and he was charged with riot. This struck many people as an overreaction: the prosecution lagged and was seemingly about to be withdrawn when Phipps made a speech to Dublin Corporation on the disorder in the city, and specifically referred to the Moore case. It is unlikely that he intended to influence the result of the trial, but the speech was widely seen as an interference with the course of justice.

Moore's case was contrasted with that of Edward Lloyd, a bookseller who published the Memoirs of the Chevalier St. George, better known as the Old Pretender. He was prosecuted for publishing seditious matter, but Phipps intervened to end the proceedings by nolle prosequi. His reasons were entirely humane – Lloyd was a relatively poor man and the publication was purely a commercial venture, without any political motive- but it was widely seen as further evidence of his involvement in a Jacobite conspiracy. Phipps' well-meant efforts to ban the annual procession round the statue of William III in College Green (once more on the grounds that it was inflammatory) increased his unpopularity. In 1713 it was rumoured, wrongly, that the new Lord Lieutenant of Ireland, the Duke of Shrewsbury, had made it a condition of taking up office that Phipps be dismissed, together with his main ally on the Bench, Richard Nutley.

In the 1713 general election, Phipps undertook to secure a Tory majority: but in fact, the new House of Commons was deeply hostile to him. He was also blamed for the Dublin election riot by Tory supporters. By the spring of 1714 he was described as "the pivot on which all debate turned": yet any of his actions which were denounced by the Commons found support in the House of Lords. A petition from the Commons to the Queen demanding his removal was followed by a counter-petition from the Lords in his defence, which stressed his loyalty to the Queen and to the Established Church. The Queen's death at the beginning of August resolved the problem since her successor George I simply dismissed her Irish judges en bloc.

== Last years ==
Unlike some of his colleagues, Phipps was largely left in peace after his dismissal, and his last years were uneventful. He spoke at the trial of George Seton, 5th Earl of Winton for his alleged acts of treason during the Jacobite rising of 1715, but was severely reprimanded by the presiding judge for speaking without permission. In 1715 to 1716 he was a subject of Henry Maxwell's investigation into the Tory government in Ireland. In 1723 he assisted in the defence of Francis Atterbury, Bishop of Rochester, also on a charge of treason, but he died at Middle Temple on 9 October. He was buried at White Waltham in Berkshire. His monument was sculpted by William Palmer.

== Family ==
Phipps married Catherine Sawyer, daughter of George Sawyer, and granddaughter of Sir Robert Sawyer who was Attorney General to Charles II, counsel for the defence at the Trial of the Seven Bishops in the reign of James II and Speaker of the House of Commons. Phipps and Catherine had eleven children, of whom several died young. Those who survived infancy included a son, William, and a daughter, Catherine, who married Colonel Henry Ingoldsby, MP for Limerick, son of Colonel Richard Ingoldsby.

William married Lady Catherine, daughter of James Annesley, 3rd Earl of Anglesey; she was a granddaughter of James II through her mother, the former Lady Catherine Darnley. Their son was Constantine Phipps, 1st Baron Mulgrave; later generations added the titles Earl of Mulgrave and Marquess of Normanby. The 1st Marquess was Lord Lieutenant of Ireland from 1835 to 1839, and unlike his ancestor was popular with the Irish public.

== Character ==
Phipps is a difficult character to judge: he was divisive in his lifetime and also divided historians. Duhigg thought badly of him, and Elrington Ball, in the definitive study of the pre-1921 Irish judiciary, dealt harshly with Phipps as a foolish, vain, self-important man whose extreme political views paralysed political life and brought the administration of Dublin to a halt. On the other hand, O'Flanagan in his work on the Irish Lord Chancellors spoke highly of Phipps as a gifted and moderate man who made a genuine attempt to calm political and religious strife in Ireland.

He was a fine lawyer, and a reforming Chancellor: O'Flanagan praises his efforts to make litigation cheaper and faster, and suggests this was one cause of his unpopularity within his own profession. He often showed poor judgement in politics, but there is no reason to doubt the sincerity of his beliefs, which were no more extreme than those of many of his contemporaries. That he survived as Lord Chancellor for four difficult years, in the face of the hostility of two successive Viceroys, suggests that he did not entirely lack political skill. He was certainly to blame in part for the paralysis in the Dublin city government, but it is hardly fair to suggest, as Ball seems to, that he was wholly responsible for it: indeed all his actions found supporters. If he made enemies he also had friends and it is notable that both Jonathan Swift and George Berkeley spoke well of him.

== Notes ==
Legal offices
In commission Title last held by Richard Freeman	Lord Chancellor of Ireland; 1710–1714	Succeeded by Alan Brodrick
