= Richard Freeman (Irish judge) =

English-born Irish judge

Richard Freeman (1646–1710) was an English-born judge who held the office of Lord Chancellor of Ireland.

== Family ==
He was born in Gloucestershire, the eldest son of John Freeman and his wife Anne Croft. He was educated at Christ Church, Oxford and called to the Bar in 1674. He married firstly in 1693 Elizabeth, one of the many daughters of the leading politician and barrister Sir Anthony Keck, and his wife Mary Thorne. Elizabeth died in childbirth with her only daughter Mary in 1699. He married secondly in 1702 Anne Marshal of Durham, who outlived him by many years. His first marriage was an advantageous one since his father-in-law Sir Anthony Keck was a very rich man. However, Freeman's children may have found the Keck inheritance something of a mixed blessing, as it led after his death to much acrimony and years of litigation between the heirs. By the time of his first marriage in 1693, he was already the owner of what seems to have been a substantial estate at Batsford in Gloucestershire.

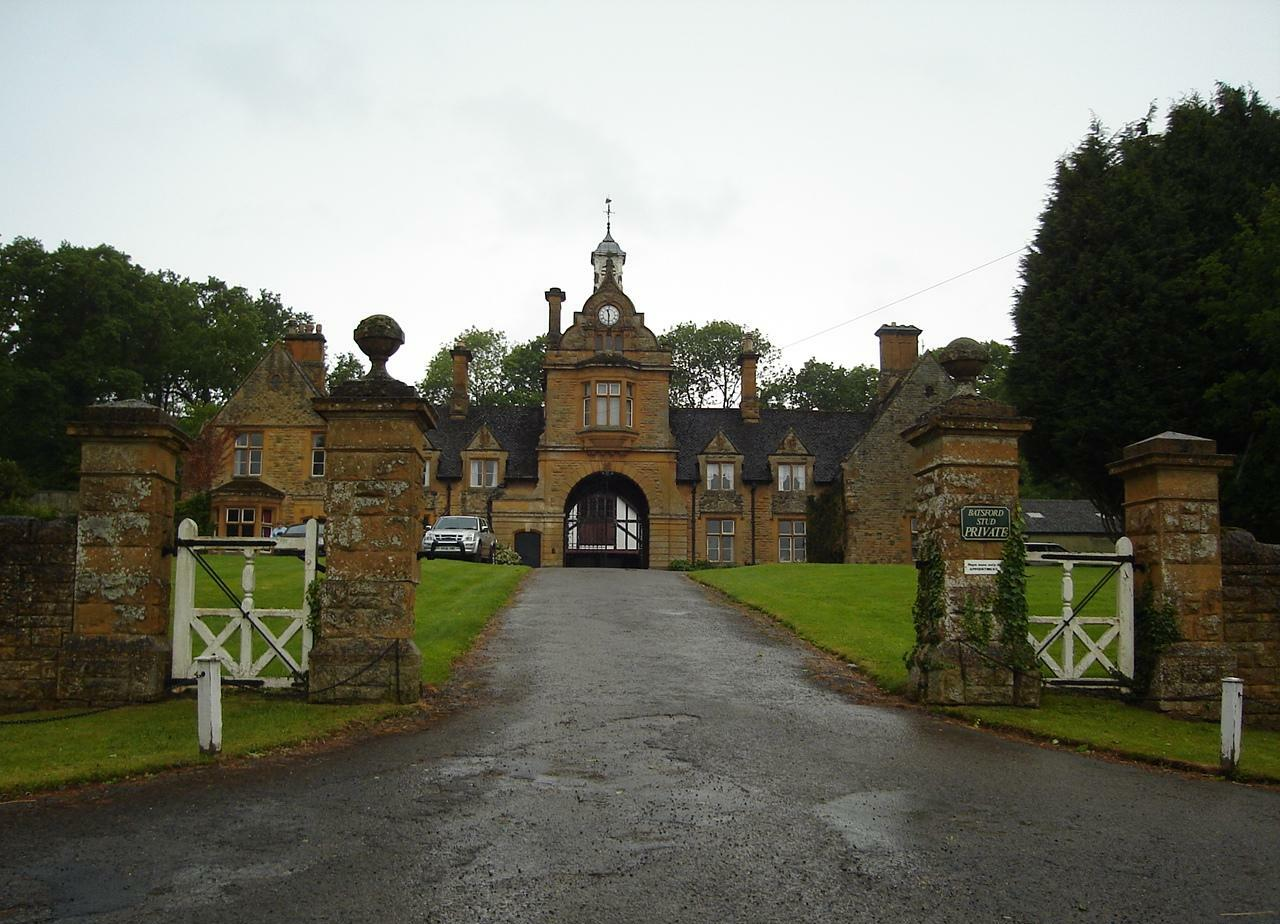
Batsford, Gloucestershire, where Freeman had an estate

By his first marriage, he had one daughter, Mary, who married Walter Edwards of Ham, Surrey, and had issue, including Thomas Edwards-Freeman; by his second marriage, he had one son, Richard junior, and one daughter, Anne. All three of his children were still living in 1727, when the long and bitter lawsuit over their father's estate was finally concluded by a verdict that any claim that Mary had on the estate must be set off against the sum of £5000 which her father had settled on her. Mary died in 1736; Anne had died unmarried some years earlier. Richard junior died in 1741, without issue. Mary's direct descendants died out in 1808.

== Career ==
After 30 years practice at the English Bar Freeman finally secured judicial office through his friendship with John Somers, the former Lord Chancellor, who had a high opinion of his abilities. In 1706 he became Lord Chief Baron of the Irish Exchequer and within a year was appointed Lord Chancellor of Ireland, in which capacity he also acted as Speaker of the Irish House of Lords. He is listed as one of the trustees of the King's Inns in 1706.

In 1710 Freeman was suddenly afflicted with what was described as "a disorder of the brain" which was said to have deprived him entirely of his reason. Certainly, he was unable to continue in office. He died on 20 November 1710, shortly after resigning from the Chancellorship. He died intestate, and the dispute over the inheritance to his estate, in particular the sum of £5000 which he had settled on his elder daughter Mary Edwards, led to litigation between his widow and children, which went on until 1727.

== Character ==
According to Elrington Ball, Freeman was a fine lawyer who gained general respect in Ireland, being noted for good humour and charity as well as legal ability. His death, following on the tragic collapse of his mental powers, was genuinely mourned; a pamphleteer eulogised his brief tenure as Chancellor as "a golden age".

Legal offices
Preceded by Sir Richard Cox	Lord Chancellor of Ireland; 1707–1710	In commission Title next held by Sir Constantine Henry Phipps
