= Richard Vaughan (judge) =

English Member of Parliament (died 1724)

Richard Vaughan MP (c. 1655–October 1724) of Derwydd, Carmarthenshire was a Welsh lawyer and Whig politician who sat in the English and British House of Commons for nearly 40 years from 1685 to 1724.

Vaughan was the eldest son of John Vaughan of Court Derllys and his wife Rachel Vaughan, daughter of Sir Henry Vaughan of Derwydd, Carmarthenshire. He matriculated at Jesus College, Oxford 23 May 1672, aged 16. He was admitted at Gray's Inn in 1673, was called to the bar in 1680 and made a bencher in 1706. He succeeded his uncle Sir Henry Vaughan, to Derwydd Mansion, near Llandybie in 1676.

Vaughan was appointed Recorder of Carmarthenshire for 1683-86 and 1688-1722 and a circuit judge on the Carmarthenshire circuit on 1715, serving as such until his death.

Vaughan was elected Member of Parliament for Carmarthen for 1685–87 and 1689 to his death in 1724. His monument in Carmarthen Parish Church was sculpted by William Palmer.

He is now reckoned to have been Father of the House from 1718 to his death, although it is not clear that he was regarded as such at the time.

He married, in 1692, Arabella, the daughter of Sir Erasmus Philipps, 3rd Baronet, M.P., of Picton Castle, Pembrokeshire. They had no children and his estate passed to his niece, the wife of John Vaughan, MP for Carmarthenshire.

Parliament of England
Preceded by Altham Vaughan	Member of Parliament for Carmarthen; 1685–1707	Succeeded by Parliament of Great Britain
Parliament of Great Britain
Preceded by Parliament of England	Member of Parliament for Carmarthen; 1707–1724	Succeeded by James Phillips
Preceded by Edward Vaughan	Father of the House; 1718–1724	Succeeded by Lord William Powlett
