= William Palmer (sculptor) =

English sculptor

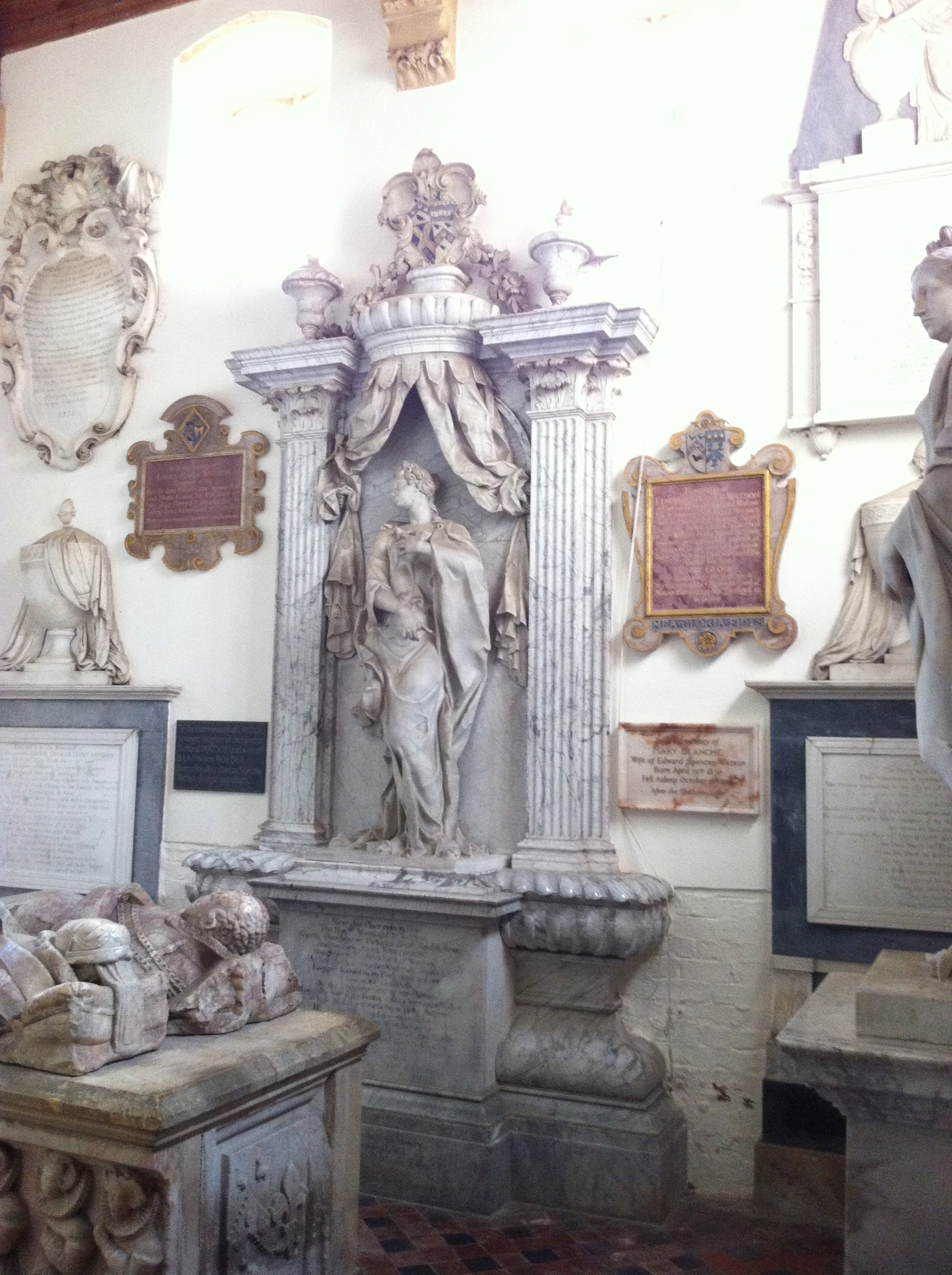
Monument to Margaret Watson, 1714, St Leonard's Church, Rockingham, Northamptonshire

William Palmer (1673–1739) was an English sculptor and stonemason based in London. He has been described as "one of the most important of early eighteenth-century sculptors" in England, his main works mostly being funerary monuments.

== Life ==
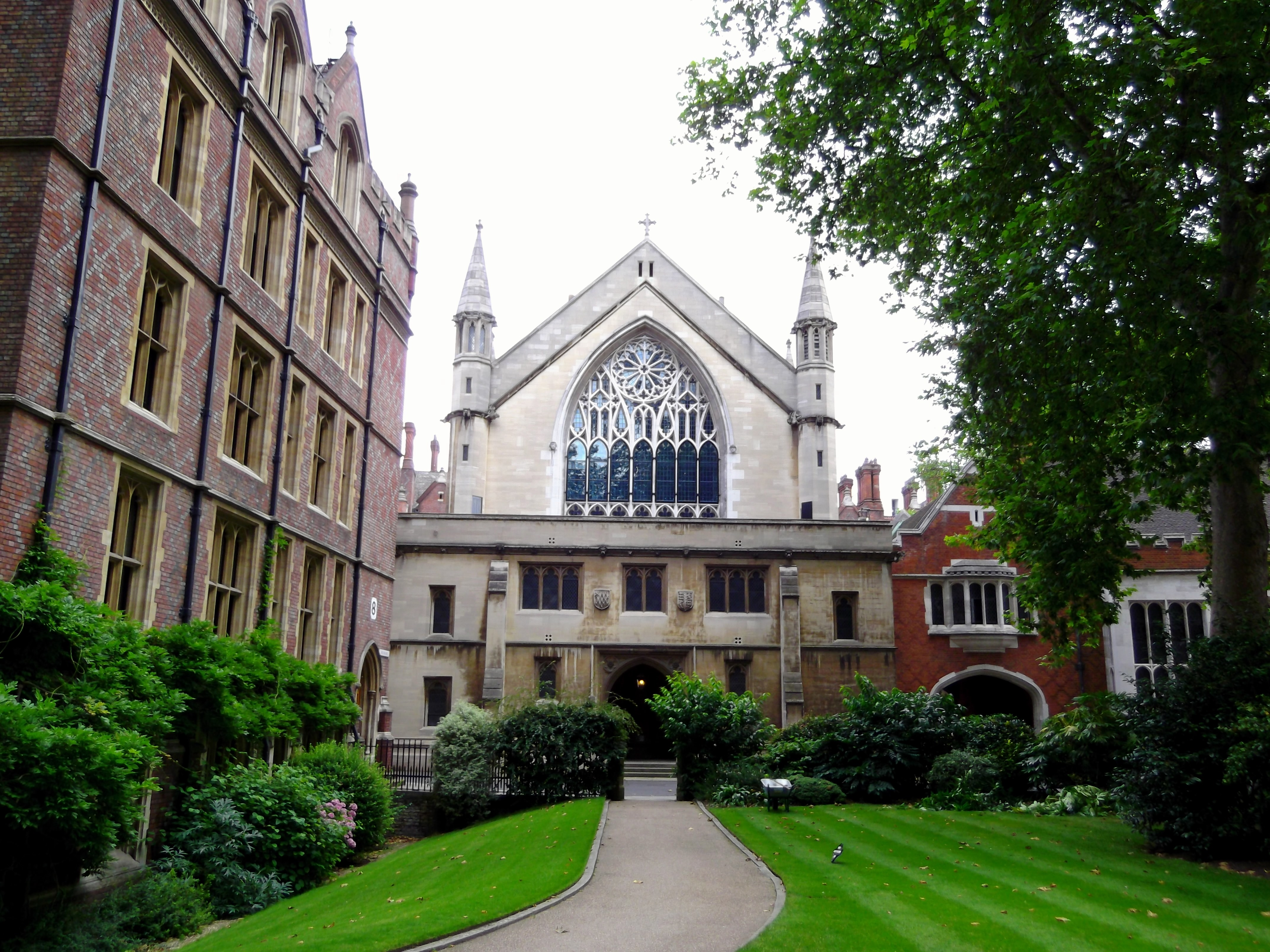
Lincoln's Inn Chapel

He was born in London the son of William Palmer, a coachman in the parish of St Giles-in-the-Fields. He was apprenticed to James Hardy in 1687 but in 1689/90 transferred to the yard of Josiah Tully. He became a Freeman mason in 1694 and returned to work in Hardy's yard. In 1696 he went to work as an assistant to John Nost.

By 1710 he had his own stoneyard at Red Lion Square. In 1718 he became official mason to Lincoln's Inn and remained such until his death in late 1739. He was married to Anne and was father to the sculptor Benjamin Palmer who took over his father's stoneyard at Gray's Inn.

== Works ==
- Chimney-pieces for Ampthill for Lord Ashburnham (1706)
- Chimney-pieces for Ashburnham House in Westminster for Lord Ashburnham (1706)
- Monument to Anne Crispe at Birchington (1708)
- Monument to Sir Roger Meredith at Leeds, Kent (1712)
- Large monument to Margaret Watson (1667-1714) at St Leonard's Church, Rockingham, Northamptonshire (1714). This "life-size statue, with its sweeping draperies, is English Baroque at its best".
- Monument to Richard Walburge at Barholme (1715)
- Monument to Anne Gelthorpe at Hillington, Norfolk (1716)
- Monument to Elizabeth Hatten in Lincoln Cathedral (1724)
- Monument to Richard Vaughan in Carmarthen Parish Church (1724)
- Monument to Ann Crofts at Little Saxham (1727)
- London townhouse of Lord Folkestone at Red Lion Square (1727-1738)
- Monument to William Chambers at Great Offley (1728)
- Monument to Constantine Phipps (Lord Chancellor of Ireland) at White Waltham (1728)
- Monument to John Barham at Wadhurst (1730)
- Monument to William Games at Upton, Northamptonshire (1731)
- Lincoln's Inn Chapel (1730-1733)
- Monument to Lady Stepney at Llanelly (1733)
- Monument to Gilbert Browne at North Mimms (1737)
- Monument to James Fortrye at Northfleet (1737)
- Chimney-pieces for Edward Trotman at Shelswell (1738)
- Monument to Stephen Everard at Faversham (1738)
- Chimney-pieces for Henry Purefoy at Shalstone (1739)
