= Richard Nutley =

English politician and judge (1670–1729)

Richard Nutley (1670–1729) was an English-born barrister, politician and judge assigned to official duty in early eighteenth-century Ireland. Whilst having a fascinating legal and political career, he also enjoyed the friendship of Jonathan Swift.

== Family ==
He was the second son of the famed William Nutley, a leading barrister of the Middle Temple; his brother, also named William, had some reputation as a poet. He matriculated from New Inn Hall, University of Oxford in 1688, graduated Bachelor of Arts in 1691, and became Master of Arts in 1694.

== Career ==
He followed his father's path to the Middle Temple in 1695 and was called to the Bar in 1698. He went to Ireland in 1699 as secretary to the Royal Commission on Forfeited Estates. He entered the King's Inn the same year, and was elected to the Irish House of Commons as member for Lisburn in 1703. His practice at the Irish Bar was extremely successful: out of his income, he was able to pay his brother William, who had become impoverished, a pension of £300 a year.

=== Judge ===
The most powerful of his political allies was James Butler, 2nd Duke of Ormonde, head of the great Butler dynasty and twice Lord Lieutenant of Ireland. Nutley is known to have been acting as his financial agent in 1703, endeavouring to raise money on the family estates (which were heavily encumbered with mortgages), and afterwards became his steward. It was Ormonde's influence which led to Nutley's elevation to the Court of King's Bench (Ireland) in 1711.

He was a judge of notably strong Tory views, which led to serious differences with his colleagues, even though they were generally also inclined to Toryism. They accused him of outright falsehood, and of twisting the law in his judgments for political ends. As early as 1712 his removal from the Bench was said to be imminent. Those years saw a bitter dispute between the Crown and Dublin Corporation concerning the appointment of the Lord Mayor of Dublin and other officials: Nutley like all his colleagues on the Bench sided with the Crown, and signed a report justifying the Crown's stance in the matter. Nutley was sent to London in 1714 to explain the judges' conduct.

Official business in Dublin reached a deadlock: much of the blame for the controversy was placed on the Lord Chancellor of Ireland, Sir Constantine Phipps. Elrington Ball, perhaps with some exaggeration, called Phipps "the pivot on which all debate turned". Nutley could not avoid being drawn into the attacks on Phipps, since the two men were politically very close: Nutley was unkindly called Phipps' "creature". In 1713 it was rumoured, wrongly, that the new Lord Lieutenant of Ireland, the Duke of Shrewsbury, would make the dismissal of both Phipps and Nutley a condition of his taking up office.

== Later life ==
Nutley managed to retain office until August 1714, when on the death of Queen Anne, the new King George I removed her Irish judges en bloc. Nutley's patron the Duke of Ormonde nominated him to be deputy steward of Westminster Abbey, but the Dean and Chapter of Westminster vetoed the appointment, and he returned to his practice at the Irish Bar.

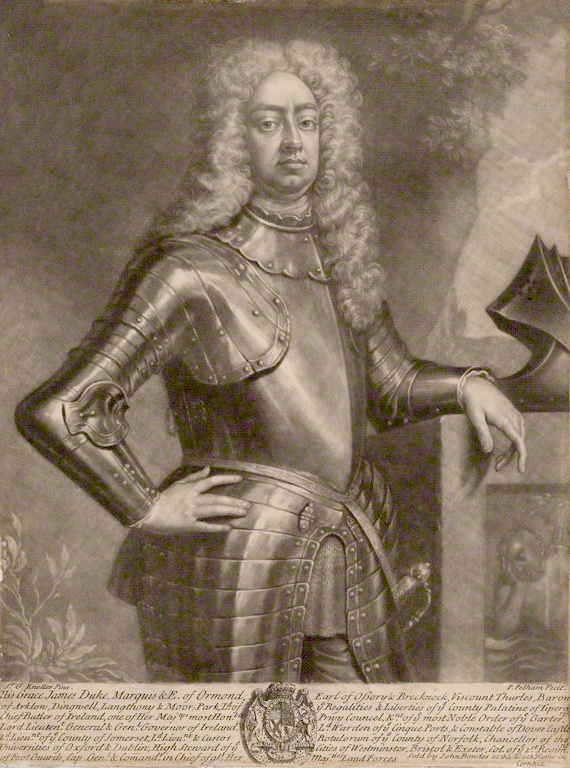
James Butler, 2nd Duke of Ormonde, Nutley's most powerful patron.

Ormonde's defection to the Jacobite cause, which caused his flight to France in August 1715 and the end of his career, was a great blow to Nutley. It was anticipated, wrongly, that he would follow Ormonde into exile, but it seems that his political beliefs were not sufficiently strong for him to give up what was still, despite his loss of office, a comfortable life in Dublin. In 1719 it was rumoured that he was sheltering the Duke in his house at Mary Street in Dublin, but there seems to have been no substance to the report.

In 1716 the old controversy between Dublin Corporation and the Crown was revived. Nutley was examined by the Irish House of Commons on the report he had signed in 1712-3. He insisted that he had acted impartially, but the Commons passed a resolution recommending that he be impeached. The issue quickly died down: no further action was taken against Nutley, and in 1723 it was suggested that he might be reappointed to the Bench, although nothing came of this.

He married his beloved wife Phillipa Venables in 1708. He died in Dublin of appendicitis in 1729 and was buried in St Mary's Church, Dublin.

== Character ==
Elrington Ball called Nutley a man who brought "much worldly wisdom" to the Irish Bench. He treated his poverty-stricken brother William with great generosity, and his friendly correspondence with Jonathan Swift shows that Swift had a strong personal regard for him.
