= Earl of Conway =

Aristocratic title in the Peerage of England

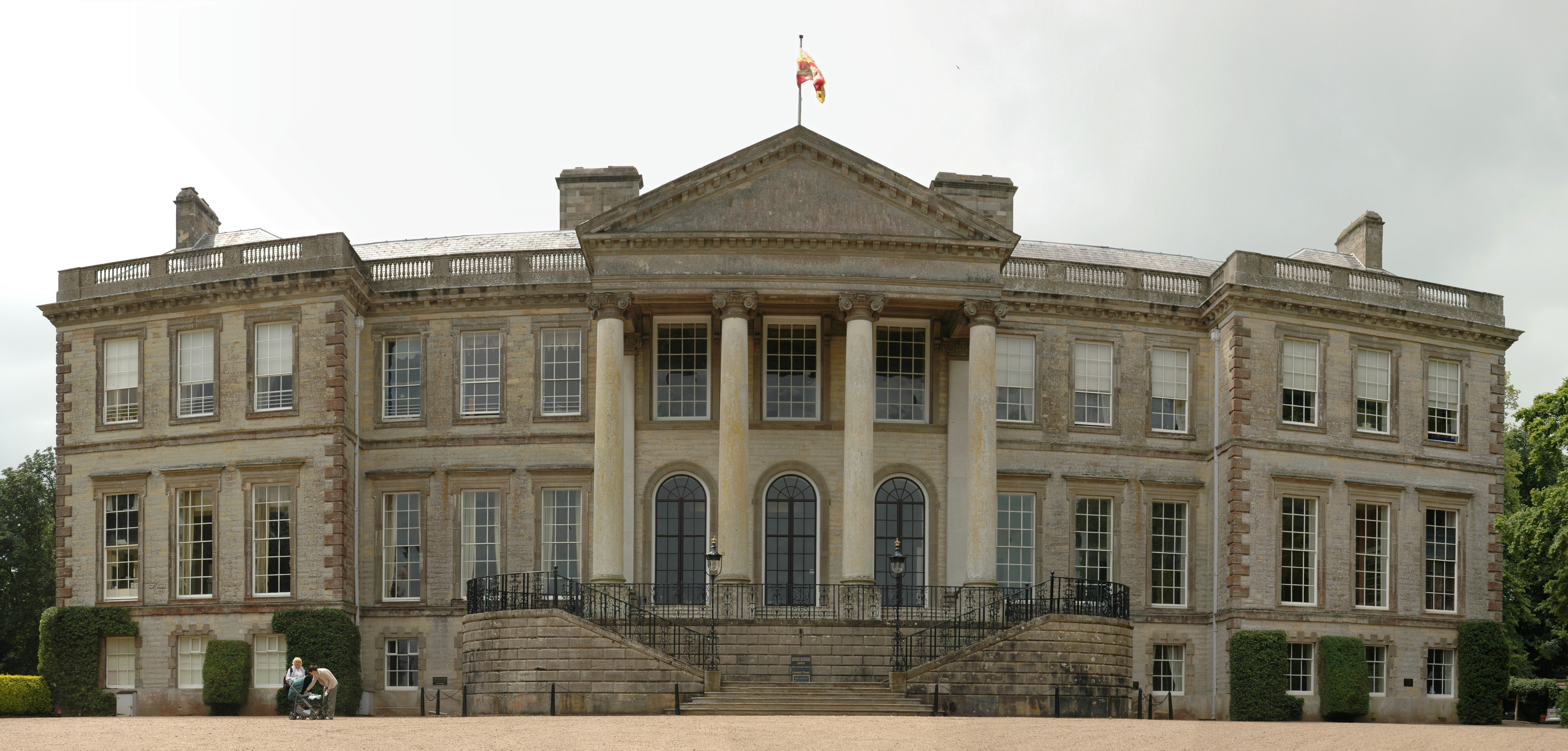
Ragley Hall in Warwickshire, at present the seat of the Seymour (formerly Seymour-Conway) family, Marquesses of Hertford

The Earl of Conway was an aristocratic title in the Peerage of England. The earldom was created in 1679 for Edward Conway, 3rd Viscount Conway (c.1623-1683), subsequently Secretary of State for the Northern Department. When Edward Conway died in 1683, he had no heir and the title automatically became extinct.

The family seats of the Conway family were Conwy Castle in Wales and Ragley Hall in Warwickshire, England.

Edward Conway was descended from Sir John Conway, Governor of Ostend, whose son Edward Conway (1564-1631), Secretary of State and Lord President of the Council, was created Baron Conway, of Ragley in the County of Warwick, in 1624, and Viscount Conway, of Conway Castle, in 1627, and Viscount Killultagh also in 1627, all in the Peerage of Ireland. He was succeeded by his son, Edward Conway, 2nd Viscount Conway (1594-1655), a soldier and politician who in 1628 was summoned to the House of Lords through a writ of acceleration in his father's junior title Baron Conway. When the elder Edward Conway died in 1655, the titles passed to his son, Edward Conway. In 1679, the son became the Earl of Conway.

When Edward Conway died, his estates were bequeathed to his second cousin Popham Seymour (1675-1699). Popham Seymour assumed the additional surname and arms of Conway. In 1699, Popham was killed in a duel. The Conway estates then passed to his younger brother Francis Seymour.

== Viscounts Conway (1627) ==
- Edward Conway, 1st Viscount Conway (1564–1631)
- Edward Conway, 2nd Viscount Conway (1594–1655)
- Edward Conway, 3rd Viscount Conway (1623–1683) (created Earl of Conway in 1679)

== Earls of Conway (1679) ==
- Edward Conway, 1st Earl of Conway (1623–1683)

== See also ==
- Conway baronets
- Marquess of Hertford
