= Edward Conway, 1st Viscount Conway =

English soldier and statesman

The Right Honourable The Viscount Conway PC

Lord President of the Council
- In office 1628–1631
- Monarch: Charles I
- Preceded by: The Earl of Marlborough

Personal details
- Born: Edward Conway; 1564
- Died: 3 January 1631 (aged 66–67) St Martin's Lane, London, England
- Resting place: Arrow, Warwickshire, England
- Spouse: Dorothy Tracy

Edward Conway, 1st Viscount Conway PC (1564 – 3 January 1631) was an English soldier and statesman. He was the son and heir of Sir John Conway of Arrow, and his wife Ellen or Eleanor, daughter of Sir Fulke Greville of Beauchamp's Court, Warwickshire and his wife Elizabeth Willoughby, 3rd Baroness Willoughby de Broke.

Lord Conway commanded a foot regiment at the sack of Cádiz in 1596, where he was knighted. He then served as governor of Brill, an English Cautionary Town near Rotterdam in the Netherlands, where his daughter Brilliana (who married Robert Harley) was born. In the first parliament held in the reign of James I, he sat as member for Penryn. When Brill was handed back to the States of Holland in 1616, he was given a pension.

Conway was appointed to the Privy Council in 1622 and made a Secretary of State in January 1623 for five years. In the parliament which convened on 19 February 1624 he was returned for Evesham. He was created Baron Conway, of Ragley, in 1624 or 1625 and Viscount Conway in 1627, and received the Irish peerage title of Viscount Killultagh. No doubt as a result of his time in the Netherlands, he was a supporter of a 'Protestant' foreign policy; he was sent as ambassador to Prague. In 1628, he was appointed Lord President of the Council, a post he held until his death on 3 January 1631.

== Family ==
Conway married firstly Dorothy (died 1613), daughter of Sir John Tracy of Tedington, Gloucestershire, and widow of Edmund Bray. They had three sons and four daughters, including Conway's son and heir Edward.

In 1614 or 1615, Conway married secondly Katherine (died 1639), daughter of Giles Hueriblock, a merchant from Ghent, and widow of John West (died 1612) and Richard Fust (died 1613), both of the London Grocers' Company. She was an extensive investor in New World ventures including the Virginia Company. The second Lady Conway left various bequests for education and relief of poverty. She is buried in St Mary's Church, Acton.

== Notes ==
Parliament of England
Preceded by Thomas Prowse; William Maynard	Member of Parliament for Penryn; 1610–1611; With: William Maynard	Succeeded by William Maynard; Sir Francis Crane
Preceded by Sir Thomas Biggs, 1st Baronet; Anthony Langston	Member of Parliament for Evesham; 1624; With: Richard Cresheld	Succeeded by Richard Cresheld; Anthony Langston
Political offices
Preceded by The Earl of Southampton	Lord Lieutenant of Hampshire; 1625–1631	Succeeded by The Lord Weston
Preceded by Robert Naunton; George Calvert	Secretary of State; 1623–1628; With: George Calvert 1623–1625; Albertus Morton 1625; John Coke 1625–1628	Succeeded by The Viscount Dorchester; John Coke
Preceded by The Earl of Marlborough	Lord President of the Council; 1628–1631	Unknown Next known title holder: The Earl of Shaftesbury
Preceded by Thomas Cecil, 1st Earl of Exeter	Governor of Brill, The Netherlands. 1596–1616	Vacant Next known title holder: unknown
Peerage of England
New creation	Viscount Conway; 1627–1631	Succeeded by Edward Conway
New creation	Baron Conway (descended by acceleration); 1624/1625–1628	Succeeded by Edward Conway
Peerage of Ireland
New creation	Viscount Killultagh; 1627–1631	Succeeded by Edward Conway
