= Edward Conway, 2nd Viscount Conway =

English politician, military commander, bibliophile and peer

The Right Honourable The Viscount Conway PC (Ire)
- Armorial book binding of Edward, 2nd Viscount Conway

Member of Parliament for Warwick
- In office 1624–1625
- Preceded by: John Cooke
- Succeeded by: Francis Leigh

Personal details
- Born: Edward Conway
- Died: 26 June 1655 Lyon, France
- Resting place: Arrow, Warwickshire, England
- Spouse(s): Martha Conway, née Eltonhead; Frances Popham, the Honorable Frances Conway
- Children: 6, including Edward

Edward Conway, 2nd Viscount Conway, PC (Ire) (bapt. 10 August 1594 – 26 June 1655) was an English politician, military commander, bibliophile and peer.

== Early life and education ==
Conway was the eldest son of The 1st Viscount Conway and his wife, Dorothy, and was baptised on 10 August 1594 in Arrow, Warwickshire. He matriculated from The Queen's College, Oxford, on 3 May 1611 and is thought to have learnt military strategy from his uncle by marriage, Sir Horace Vere. He was knighted on 25 March 1618, and in 1621, he married Frances Popham (a daughter of Sir Francis Popham). He succeeded his father in the peerage in January 1631.

== Political and military service ==
Conway was nominated by Lord Brooke to become Member of Parliament for Warwick between 1624 and 1625, and in 1626, he was elected for Yarmouth (Isle of Wight). In 1628, after his father was created Viscount Conway and Viscount Killultagh, Conway was summoned to parliament in the right of the Conway barony. He succeeded his father to his titles following his death on 3 January 1631.

Lord Conway unsuccessfully commanded Charles I's forces at the Battle of Newburn in 1640. He became an Irish Privy Counsellor, Marshal of the Army in Ireland, and was served as a member of the Westminster Assembly of Divines from 1643 to 1649.

He was briefly imprisoned after being implicated in the plot by Edmund Waller and others to seize London for the king.

== Personal life ==
Like his father, Lord Conway had a particular interest in English literature, with literary connections including Sir John Beaumont, Michael Drayton, Ben Jonson, John Donne, and Sir John Suckling. In 1643, his London library was catalogued as containing 5,000 or more volumes, and his library at Lisnagarvey in County Antrim contained between 8,000 and 9,900 books and manuscripts.

He retired to the house of The 10th Earl of Northumberland in Petworth, Sussex, in the early 1650s. He later travelled abroad and died in Lyon, France on 26 June 1655. He was buried in Arrow, and his titles passed to his only son, Edward, who was later created Earl of Conway. His daughter Dorothy married Sir George Rawdon, 1st Baronet.

Parliament of England
Preceded by John Coke; Sir Greville Verney	Member of Parliament for Warwick; 1624–1625; With: Francis Lucy	Succeeded by Sir Francis Leigh, Bt; Francis Lucy
Preceded by John Oglander; Sir John Suckling	Member of Parliament for Yarmouth (Isle of Wight); 1626–1628; With: Sir John Oglander	Succeeded by Sir John Oglander; Edward Dennis
Peerage of England
Preceded by Edward Conway	Viscount Conway; 1631–1655	Succeeded by Edward Conway
Preceded by Edward Conway	Baron Conway (writ in acceleration); 1628–1655	Succeeded by Edward Conway
Peerage of Ireland
Preceded by Edward Conway	Viscount Killultagh; 1631–1655	Succeeded by Edward Conway
