= Edward Conway, 1st Earl of Conway =

English nobleman and politician

The Right Honourable The Earl of Conway PC, FRS
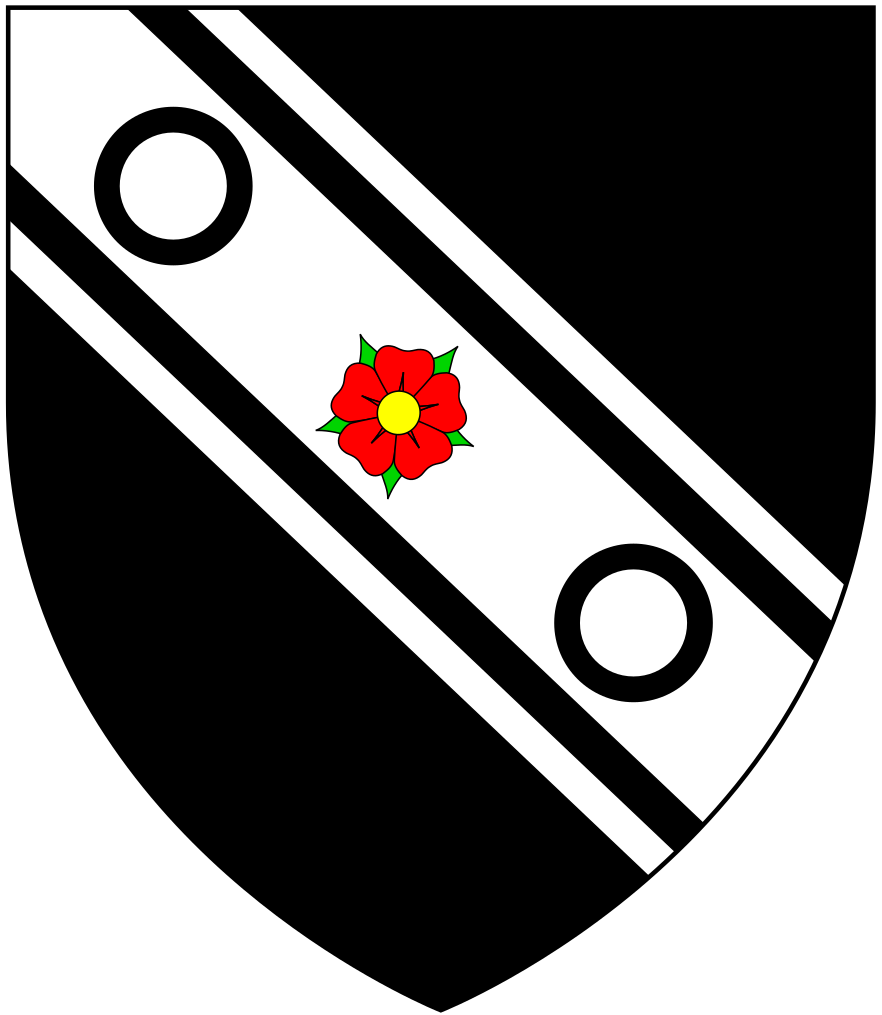
- Arms of Conway: Sable, on a bend cotised argent a rose gules between two annulets of the first

Secretary of State for the Northern Department
- In office 2 February 1681 – 28 January 1683
- Monarch: Charles II
- Preceded by: Leoline Jenkins
- Succeeded by: The Earl of Sunderland

Personal details
- Born: Edward Conway c. 1623
- Died: 11 August 1683 (aged 59–60)
- Resting place: Arrow, Warwickshire, England
- Party: Tory
- Spouse(s): Anne Finch (m. 1651–1679) Elizabeth Booth (d. 1681); Ursula Stawell
- Occupation: Politician

Edward Conway, 1st Earl of Conway (c. 1623 – 11 August 1683) PC, FRS, of Ragley Hall, Alcester, in Warwickshire, was an English peer and politician who served as Secretary of State for the Northern Department between 1681 and 1683.

== Origins ==
Conway was born circa 1623, the son and heir of Edward Conway, 2nd Viscount Conway (1594–1655) by his wife Frances Popham, daughter of Sir Francis Popham (1573–1644) MP, of Wellington in Somerset and Littlecote in Berkshire (now Wiltshire).

== Career ==
He succeeded as 3rd Viscount Conway (in the Peerage of England) and 3rd Viscount Killultagh (in the Peerage of Ireland) following the death of his father in 1655. Conway became a member of the Irish Privy Council in 1660 and was a confidant of James Butler, 1st Duke of Ormonde. He became a Fellow of the Royal Society on 2 January 1668, became governor of Charlemont Fort in 1671 and served as Master of the Ordnance in Ireland from 1679.

On 3 December 1679, Conway was created Earl of Conway. On 2 February 1681 he joined the Privy Council of King Charles II and became Secretary of State for the Northern Department. He resigned in January 1683 amid allegations that he was complicit in "crimes and misdemeanours ... either in relation to the King's person or his public negotiations or transactions with foreign ambassadors, or in not rightly pursuing the King's instructions to ambassadors abroad". He also served as Lord Lieutenant of Warwickshire from 1682 to 1683.

== Marriages ==
He married three times, but had no children who survived infancy:

- Firstly on 11 February 1651 to the philosopher Anne Finch (died on 23 February 1679), daughter of Sir Heneage Finch. They had one son, Heneage, who died of smallpox in infancy. Following Anne's death, Conway retired to his family's seat, Ragley Hall in Warwickshire.
- Secondly he married Elizabeth Booth (died in July 1681), daughter of George Booth, 1st Baron Delamer.
- Thirdly he married Ursula Stawell (died 13 August 1697), daughter of George Stawell, who survived him and remarried to John Sheffield, later 1st Duke of Buckingham and Normanby.

== Death and burial ==
He died on 11 August 1683 and was buried in Arrow, Warwickshire.

== Succession ==
As he died with no children, his titles became extinct. He appointed by his will as heir to his estates, including Ragley Hall, his eight-year old first cousin once removed Popham Seymour (1675–1699), eldest son of Laetitia Popham (a daughter of his uncle Alexander Popham (1605–1669), MP, of Littlecote) by her husband (to whom she was his second wife) Sir Edward Seymour, 4th Baronet (died 1708) of Berry Pomeroy in Devon. His bequest stipulated that Popham Seymour should adopt the arms and additional surname of Conway, and thus he became known as Popham Seymour-Conway. The latter's nephew and eventual heir was Francis Seymour-Conway, 1st Marquess of Hertford, (1718–1794), whose seat became Ragley Hall, where his descendant the 9th Marquess is still seated in 2015.

Political offices
Preceded by Leoline Jenkins	Secretary of State for the Northern Department; 1681–1683	Succeeded by The Earl of Sunderland
Honorary titles
Preceded by The Earl of Northampton	Lord Lieutenant of Warwickshire; 1682–1683	Succeeded by The Earl of Sunderland
Preceded by The Earl of Denbigh	Custos Rotulorum of Warwickshire; 1675–1683	Succeeded by The Earl of Sunderland
Peerage of England
New creation	Earl of Conway; 1679–1683	Extinct
Preceded by Edward Conway	Viscount Conway; 1665–1683	Extinct
Peerage of Ireland
Preceded by Edward Conway	Viscount Killultagh; 1665–1683	Extinct
