= Grade I listed buildings in Warwickshire =

Warwickshire shown within England

There are over 9,000 Grade I listed buildings in England. This page is a list of these buildings in the county of Warwickshire, by district.

== North Warwickshire ==
Name	Location	Type	Completed (Note: The date given is the date used by Historic England as significant for the initial building or that of an important part in the structure's description.)	Date designated	Grid ref. (Note: The grid reference is based on the British national grid reference system, sometimes known as OSGB36, used by the Ordnance Survey.) Geo-coordinates	Entry number (Note: The "List Entry Number" is a unique number assigned to each listed building and scheduled monument by Historic England.)	Image
Church of St Mary the Virgin	Astley, North Warwickshire	Church	17th century	8 September 1961	SP3110389429; 52°30′07″N 1°32′36″W	1184853	Church of St Mary the Virgin More images
Church of St Peter and St Paul	Coleshill, North Warwickshire	Church	14th century	8 September 1961	SP2012089059; 52°29′57″N 1°42′18″W	1034697	Church of St Peter and St Paul More images
Church of St James	Packington Park, Great Packington, North Warwickshire	Church	1789	8 September 1961	SP2299584074; 52°27′15″N 1°39′47″W	1034813	Church of St James More images
Church of St Peter	Mancetter, North Warwickshire	Church	12th century	25 March 1968	SP3203696694; 52°34′02″N 1°31′44″W	1365169	Church of St Peter More images
Maxstoke Castle	Castle Park, Maxstoke, North Warwickshire	Castle	1345	11 November 1952	SP2241589105; 52°29′58″N 1°40′16″W	1116166	Maxstoke Castle More images
Church of Our Lady	Merevale, North Warwickshire	Abbey	13th and 14th centuries	25 March 1968	SP2904897724; 52°34′36″N 1°34′22″W	1365174	Church of Our Lady More images
Blyth Hall	Blyth Hall, Shustoke, North Warwickshire	Country House	1530	11 November 1952	SP2094590159; 52°30′32″N 1°41′34″W	1087100	Blyth Hall More images

== Nuneaton and Bedworth ==
Name	Location	Type	Completed	Date designated	Grid ref. Geo-coordinates	Entry number	Image
Arbury Hall	Arbury Park, Nuneaton and Bedworth	Country House	Late 16th century	6 December 1947	SP3352989275; 52°30′01″N 1°30′27″W	1185222	Arbury Hall More images
Stables at Arbury Hall and attached wall and gate pier to left	Arbury Park, Nuneaton and Bedworth	Stables	c. 1675	1 January 1956	SP3346589328; 52°30′03″N 1°30′30″W	1299708	Stables at Arbury Hall and attached wall and gate pier to left More images
Church of St Nicholas	Nuneaton	Church	c. 1340	6 December 1947	SP3655891653; 52°31′18″N 1°27′45″W	1299514	Church of St Nicholas More images

== Rugby ==
Name	Location	Type	Completed	Date designated	Grid ref. Geo-coordinates	Entry number	Image
Combe Abbey and bridge over moat attached to south	Combe Abbey, Combe Fields, Rugby	Country house	Late 16th century	6 October 1960	SP4032779758; 52°24′52″N 1°24′31″W	1233485	Combe Abbey and bridge over moat attached to south More images
Church of St Edith	Monks Kirby, Rugby	Church	13th century	6 October 1960	SP4632783143; 52°26′39″N 1°19′11″W	1034855	Church of St Edith More images
Screen, Gates and Gatepiers	Newnham Paddox Park, Monks Kirby, Rugby	Gate	Early/mid 18th century	6 October 1960	SP4799483483; 52°26′50″N 1°17′43″W	1186169	Upload Photo
Church of St Margaret	Wolston, Rugby	Church	14th century	6 October 1960	SP4095875755; 52°22′42″N 1°23′59″W	1185682	Church of St Margaret More images
Bilton Hall	Bilton, Rugby	Hall House	1623	11 October 1949	SP4872273756; 52°21′35″N 1°17′10″W	1035049	Bilton Hall More images
Chapel at Rugby School	Rugby	Chapel	1872	11 October 1949	SP5021474957; 52°22′13″N 1°15′50″W	1183714	Chapel at Rugby School More images
Church of St Botolph	Newbold on Avon, Rugby	Parish Church	15th century	11 October 1949	SP4867477111; 52°23′24″N 1°17′10″W	1183970	Church of St Botolph More images

== Stratford-on-Avon ==
Name	Location	Type	Completed	Date designated	Grid ref. Geo-coordinates	Entry number	Image
Malt House	Alcester, Stratford-on-Avon	House	c. 1500	11 December 1969	SP0907857432; 52°12′54″N 1°52′07″W	1024638	Malt House More images
Alcester Town Hall	Alcester, Stratford-on-Avon	Town hall	c. 1618	10 February 1956	SP0908257521; 52°12′57″N 1°52′07″W	1024606	Alcester Town Hall More images
Ragley Hall	Arrow with Weethley, Stratford-on-Avon	Country House	1680-83	1 February 1967	SP0719755538; 52°11′53″N 1°53′46″W	1355348	Ragley Hall More images
Church of St John the Baptist	Aston Cantlow, Stratford-on-Avon	Church	Late 13th century	1 February 1967	SP1376559868; 52°14′13″N 1°47′59″W	1024581	Church of St John the Baptist More images
Church of St Nicholas	Beaudesert, Stratford-on-Avon	Church	Mid 12th century	5 April 1967	SP1529566041; 52°17′32″N 1°46′38″W	1382266	Church of St Nicholas More images
Bidford Bridge	Bidford-on-Avon, Stratford-on-Avon	Bridge	Early 15th century	1 February 1967	SP0990451761; 52°09′51″N 1°51′24″W	1355318	Bidford Bridge More images
Church of All Saints	Billesley, Stratford-on-Avon	Church	12th century	5 April 1967	SP1476256816; 52°12′34″N 1°47′07″W	1382704	Church of All Saints More images
Church of St George	Lower Brailes, Brailes, Stratford-on-Avon	Church	13th century	13 October 1966	SP3153239303; 52°03′04″N 1°32′30″W	1024382	Church of St George More images
Church of All Saints	Burton Dassett, Stratford-on-Avon	Church	12th century	30 May 1967	SP3984851441; 52°09′35″N 1°25′08″W	1035653	Church of All Saints More images
Charlecote Park	Charlecote, Stratford-on-Avon	Country House	1558	6 February 1952	SP2590656425; 52°12′20″N 1°37′20″W	1381799	Charlecote Park More images
Church of St Leonard	Charlecote, Charlecote, Stratford-on-Avon	Church	1851-3	5 April 1967	SP2624956552; 52°12′24″N 1°37′02″W	1381830	Church of St Leonard More images
Gatehouse to Charlecote Park	Charlecote, Stratford-on-Avon	Gatehouse	c. 1560	5 April 1967	SP2599356411; 52°12′19″N 1°37′16″W	1381800	Gatehouse to Charlecote Park More images
Laundry and brewhouse and stables and coach house immediately south of Charlecote Park	Charlecote, Stratford-on-Avon	Estate Laundry	16th century	5 April 1967	SP2596256368; 52°12′18″N 1°37′17″W	1381808	Laundry and brewhouse and stables and coach house immediately south of Charlecote Park More images
Church of St John the Baptist	Cherington, Stratford-on-Avon	Church	13th century	13 October 1966	SP2916836585; 52°01′37″N 1°34′35″W	1355498	Church of St John the Baptist More images
Chesterton Windmill	Chesterton and Kingston, Stratford-on-Avon	Windmill	1632	7 January 1952	SP3486459349; 52°13′52″N 1°29′27″W	1300056	Chesterton Windmill More images
Compton Verney House and attached screen wall	Compton Verney, Stratford-on-Avon	Country House	c. 1714	6 February 1952	SP3106552830; 52°10′22″N 1°32′50″W	1381862	Compton Verney House and attached screen wall More images
Chapel immediately north-west of Compton Verney House	Compton Verney, Stratford-on-Avon	Chapel	1772	6 February 1952	SP3101652875; 52°10′24″N 1°32′52″W	1381863	Chapel immediately north-west of Compton Verney House More images
Compton Wynyates	Compton Wynyates, Stratford-on-Avon	Courtyard House	c. 1500	2 September 1952	SP3306141829; 52°04′26″N 1°31′09″W	1024349	Compton Wynyates More images
Parish Church (dedication unknown)	Compton Wynyates, Stratford-on-Avon	Church	c. 1665	22 September 1981	SP3300841926; 52°04′29″N 1°31′11″W	1024351	Parish Church (dedication unknown) More images
Church of St Peter	Coughton, Stratford-on-Avon	Church	c. 1530	1 February 1967	SP0834560561; 52°14′35″N 1°52′45″W	1024600	Church of St Peter More images
Coughton Court	Coughton, Stratford-on-Avon	Country House	Early 16th century	10 February 1956	SP0829960605; 52°14′37″N 1°52′48″W	1183632	Coughton Court More images
Ettington Park Hotel	Alderminster, Ettington, Stratford-on-Avon	Country House	Mid 17th century	5 April 1967	SP2474247314; 52°07′25″N 1°38′24″W	1382586	Ettington Park Hotel More images
Former Church of Holy Trinity Approximately 70 Metres East of Ettington Park Hotel	Ettington, Stratford-on-Avon	Church	c1200 additions	5 April 1967	SP2481147310; 52°07′25″N 1°38′20″W	1382588	Former Church of Holy Trinity Approximately 70 Metres East of Ettington Park Hotel More images
Farnborough Hall	Farnborough, Stratford-on-Avon	Country House	Late 17th century	7 January 1952	SP4307349413; 52°08′29″N 1°22′19″W	1374964	Farnborough Hall More images
Church of St Peter ad Vincula	Hampton Lucy, Stratford-on-Avon	Church	1822-6	5 April 1967	SP2564757013; 52°12′39″N 1°37′34″W	1382119	Church of St Peter ad Vincula More images
Church of St John the Baptist Including Wall to Guildhall	Henley-in-Arden, Stratford-on-Avon	Church	c. 1450	5 April 1967	SP1511266015; 52°17′31″N 1°46′47″W	1382379	Church of St John the Baptist Including Wall to Guildhall More images
Church of All Saints	Honington, Stratford-on-Avon	Church	c1275-1300	13 October 1966	SP2613542667; 52°04′54″N 1°37′12″W	1355483	Church of All Saints More images
Honington Hall and attached gateways, walls and temple	Honington, Stratford-on-Avon	Country House	c. 1685	2 September 1952	SP2608442687; 52°04′55″N 1°37′15″W	1024327	Honington Hall and attached gateways, walls and temple More images
Church of St Mary	Ilmington, Stratford-on-Avon	Church	Mid 12th century	13 October 1966	SP2096143470; 52°05′21″N 1°41′44″W	1024126	Church of St Mary More images
Church of St Mary the Virgin dovecote approximately 105 metres north east	Kinwarton, Stratford-on-Avon	Dovecote	Early/mid 14th century	1 February 1967	SP1058958459; 52°13′27″N 1°50′47″W	1365691	Church of St Mary the Virgin dovecote approximately 105 metres north east More images
Church of All Saints	Ladbroke, Stratford-on-Avon	Church	1616	30 May 1967	SP4134658896; 52°13′36″N 1°23′46″W	1035567	Church of All Saints More images
Church of St Peter and St Paul	Long Compton, Stratford-on-Avon	Church	Early 13th century	13 October 1966	SP2874733033; 51°59′42″N 1°34′58″W	1355491	Church of St Peter and St Paul More images
Church of St James	Long Marston, Stratford-on-Avon	Church	16th century	5 April 1967	SP1527548120; 52°07′52″N 1°46′42″W	1382595	Church of St James More images
Church of St Nicholas	Loxley, Stratford-on-Avon	Church	1845	5 April 1967	SP2585653052; 52°10′30″N 1°37′24″W	1382620	Church of St Nicholas More images
Church of St Lawrence	Oxhill, Stratford-on-Avon	Church	12th century	13 October 1966	SP3169145514; 52°06′25″N 1°32′19″W	1364748	Church of St Lawrence More images
Alscot Park	Alscot Park, Preston on Stour, Stratford-on-Avon	Country House	17th century	6 February 1952	SP2080550471; 52°09′08″N 1°41′50″W	1382655	Alscot Park More images
Church of St Mary	Preston on Stour, Stratford-on-Avon	Church	15th century	5 April 1967	SP2033749935; 52°08′50″N 1°42′15″W	1382639	Church of St Mary More images
Church of St Swithin	Quinton, Stratford-on-Avon	Church	12th century	5 April 1967	SP1835147029; 52°07′17″N 1°44′00″W	1382665	Church of St Swithin More images
Church of St Matthew	Salford Priors, Stratford-on-Avon	Church	12th century	1 February 1967	SP0773250997; 52°09′26″N 1°53′18″W	1355366	Church of St Matthew More images
Salford Hall	Abbots Salford, Salford Priors, Stratford-on-Avon	Country House	Late 15th century	1 February 1967	SP0677350060; 52°08′56″N 1°54′09″W	1300427	Salford Hall More images
Church of St James the Great	Snitterfield, Stratford-on-Avon	Church	c. 1300	5 April 1967	SP2184460095; 52°14′19″N 1°40′54″W	1382171	Church of St James the Great More images
Church of St James	Southam, Stratford-on-Avon	Church	14th century	30 May 1967	SP4179261768; 52°15′09″N 1°23′21″W	1185823	Church of St James More images
Anne Hathaway's Cottage	Shottery, Stratford-upon-Avon	Farmhouse	16th century	25 October 1951	SP1844954745; 52°11′26″N 1°43′54″W	1298551	Anne Hathaway's Cottage More images
Church of Holy Trinity	Stratford-upon-Avon	Church	Early 13th century	25 October 1951	SP2010154284; 52°11′11″N 1°42′27″W	1187824	Church of Holy Trinity More images
Clopton Bridge and attached Former Toll House	Stratford-upon-Avon	Bridge	c. 1484	25 October 1951	SP2058654852; 52°11′30″N 1°42′01″W	1204167	Clopton Bridge and attached Former Toll House More images
Guild Chapel of the Holy Cross	Stratford-upon-Avon	Guild Chapel	13th century	25 October 1951	SP2007554738; 52°11′26″N 1°42′28″W	1204554	Guild Chapel of the Holy Cross More images
Guildhall, King Edward VI Grammar School	Stratford-upon-Avon, Stratford-on-Avon	Guildhall	c. 1417	25 October 1951	SP2005554723; 52°11′25″N 1°42′29″W	1187780	Guildhall, King Edward VI Grammar School More images
Hall's Croft and attached Garden Wall	Stratford-upon-Avon	Timber Framed House	Early 16th century	25 October 1951	SP2001454525; 52°11′19″N 1°42′31″W	1187827	Hall's Croft and attached Garden Wall More images
Harvard House	Stratford-upon-Avon	House	After 1595	25 October 1951	SP2011354880; 52°11′30″N 1°42′26″W	1298524	Harvard House More images
Nash's House (new Place Museum)	Stratford-upon-Avon	Timber Framed House	c. 1600	25 October 1951	SP2009254771; 52°11′27″N 1°42′27″W	1204376	Nash's House (new Place Museum) More images
Shakespeare's Birthplace	Stratford-upon-Avon	Timber Framed House	Late 15th century	25 October 1951	SP2005555113; 52°11′38″N 1°42′29″W	1187807	Shakespeare's Birthplace More images
The Almshouses	Stratford-upon-Avon	Almshouse	Built 1427-1428	25 October 1951	52°11′25″N 1°42′30″W	1298549	The Almshouses More images
The Pedagogue's House, King Edward VI Grammar School	Stratford-upon-Avon	Teachers House	c. 1553	25 October 1951	SP2007154714; 52°11′25″N 1°42′28″W	1298548	The Pedagogue's House, King Edward VI Grammar School More images
Church of St Mary Magdalene	Tanworth-in-Arden, Stratford-on-Avon	Church	1330-1340	5 April 1967	SP1134870513; 52°19′57″N 1°50′06″W	1382445	Church of St Mary Magdalene More images
Church of St Gregory	Tredington, Stratford-on-Avon	Church	c1000 Anglo-Danish	13 October 1966	SP2591743569; 52°05′24″N 1°37′23″W	1024028	Church of St Gregory More images
Church of the Assumption of the Blessed Virgin Mary	Middle Tysoe, Tysoe, Stratford-on-Avon	Church	Late 11th century	13 October 1966	SP3409644369; 52°05′48″N 1°30′13″W	1186160	Church of the Assumption of the Blessed Virgin Mary More images
Church of St Michael	Warmington, Stratford-on-Avon	Church	12th century	30 May 1967	SP4097647483; 52°07′27″N 1°24′10″W	1355583	Church of St Michael More images
Church of St Peter	Welford-on-Avon, Stratford-on-Avon	Church	Early 13th century middle stage	5 April 1967	SP1458152223; 52°10′05″N 1°47′18″W	1382823	Church of St Peter More images
Church of All Saints	Weston-on-Avon, Stratford-on-Avon	Church	Late 15th century	5 April 1967	SP1586851917; 52°09′55″N 1°46′10″W	1382865	Church of All Saints More images
Church of St Michael	Whichford, Stratford-on-Avon	Church	15th century	13 October 1966	SP3120534659; 52°00′34″N 1°32′48″W	1355543	Church of St Michael More images
Dovecote Approximately 4 Metres East of Palmers Farmhouse	Wilmcote, Wilmcote, Stratford-on-Avon	Dovecote	Pre-C16	1 February 1967	SP1644458141; 52°13′16″N 1°45′39″W	1024558	Dovecote Approximately 4 Metres East of Palmers Farmhouse More images
Mary Arden's House and Attached Dairy	Wilmcote, Wilmcote, Stratford-on-Avon	Farmhouse	16th century	11 December 1969	SP1637658090; 52°13′15″N 1°45′42″W	1024575	Mary Arden's House and Attached Dairy More images
Palmers Farmhouse	Wilmcote, Wilmcote, Stratford-on-Avon	Farmhouse	Late 16th century	1 February 1967	SP1643358134; 52°13′16″N 1°45′39″W	1184729	Palmers Farmhouse More images
Church of St Peter	Wootton Wawen, Stratford-on-Avon	Church	1035-1040	5 April 1967	SP1531063276; 52°16′03″N 1°46′37″W	1382227	Church of St Peter More images
Church of St Peter	Wormleighton Stratford-on-Avon	Church	Early 12th century	30 May 1967	SP4477053914; 52°10′54″N 1°20′48″W	1299347	Church of St Peter More images

== Warwick ==
Name	Location	Type	Completed	Date designated	Grid ref. Geo-coordinates	Entry number	Image
Church of the Assumption of Our Lady	Ashow, Warwick	Parish Church	Early 12th century	11 April 1967	SP3123170211; 52°19′45″N 1°32′35″W	1035266	Church of the Assumption of Our Lady More images
Baddesley Clinton House and bridge over moat	Baddesley Clinton, Warwick	Courtyard House	Late 15th century	11 April 1967	SP1995571469; 52°20′27″N 1°42′31″W	1035136	Baddesley Clinton House and bridge over moat More images
Church of Saint John the Baptist	Baginton, Warwick	Parish Church	circa 13th century	11 April 1967	SP3435274761; 52°22′11″N 1°29′49″W	1116539	Church of Saint John the Baptist More images
Church of St John the Baptist	Honiley, Beausale, Haseley, Honiley and Wroxall, Warwick	Parish Church	1723	11 April 1967	SP2448972227; 52°20′51″N 1°38′31″W	1329947	Church of St John the Baptist More images
Church of St Leonard	Beausale, Haseley, Honiley and Wroxall, Warwick	Church	c. 1315	11 April 1967	SP2219170727; 52°20′03″N 1°40′33″W	1035066	Church of St Leonard More images
Church of St Mary	Haseley, Beausale, Haseley, Honiley and Wroxall, Warwick	Parish Church	12th century	11 April 1967	SP2342368025; 52°18′35″N 1°39′28″W	1115462	Church of St Mary More images
Church of Saint Chad	Bishop's Tachbrook, Warwick	Parish Church	circa mid 12th century	11 April 1967	SP3137161388; 52°14′59″N 1°32′31″W	1364940	Church of Saint Chad More images
Church of St Mary	Cubbington, Warwick	Parish Church	Early 12th century	11 July 1967	SP3439268338; 52°18′43″N 1°29′49″W	1364926	Church of St Mary More images
Kenilworth Abbey Ruins	Kenilworth, Warwick	Abbey	c. 1122	1 June 1949	SP2847372368; 52°20′55″N 1°35′00″W	1035328	Kenilworth Abbey Ruins More images
Church of St Nicholas	Kenilworth, Warwick	Abbey	Norman	1 June 1949	SP2856272446; 52°20′58″N 1°34′56″W	1300415	Church of St Nicholas More images
Kenilworth Castle	Kenilworth, Warwick	Castle	Early 12th century	10 November 1971	SP2782972213; 52°20′50″N 1°35′34″W	1035327	Kenilworth Castle More images
Church of St Mary the Virgin	Lapworth, Warwick	Church	12th century	11 April 1967	SP1630971096; 52°20′16″N 1°45′43″W	1184159	Church of St Mary the Virgin More images
Packwood House and outbuildings to north east	Packwood, Lapworth, Warwick	House	Late 16th century	11 April 1967	SP1735272239; 52°20′53″N 1°44′48″W	1184240	Packwood House and outbuildings to north east More images
Church of St Laurence	Rowington, Warwick	Church	C11/C12	11 April 1967	SP2040069270; 52°19′16″N 1°42′08″W	1035098	Church of St Laurence More images
Church of Saint Mary	Stoneleigh, Warwick	Parish Church	c. Late 12th century	11 April 1967	SP3303772590; 52°21′01″N 1°30′59″W	1035159	Church of Saint Mary More images
Stoneleigh Abbey	Stoneleigh, Warwick	House	18th century	11 April 1967	SP3184671250; 52°20′18″N 1°32′02″W	1035149	Stoneleigh Abbey More images
Stoneleigh Abbey Gatehouse 83 yards to north west of Stoneleigh Abbey	Stoneleigh, Warwick	House	Early 17th century	11 April 1967	SP3179671341; 52°20′21″N 1°32′05″W	1335868	Stoneleigh Abbey Gatehouse 83 yards to north west of Stoneleigh Abbey More images
Church of Saint Mary including Beauchamp Chapel	Warwick	Church	Norman	10 January 1953	SP2819964982; 52°16′56″N 1°35′17″W	1035500	Church of Saint Mary including Beauchamp Chapel More images
Church of Saint Nicholas	Warwick	Church	Medieval	10 January 1953	SP2862764932; 52°16′54″N 1°34′54″W	1364801	Church of Saint Nicholas More images
East Gate and St Peter's Chapel, and the attached section of town wall	Warwick	Gatehouse	15th century	10 January 1953	SP2840864989; 52°16′56″N 1°35′06″W	1035501	East Gate and St Peter's Chapel, and the attached section of town wall More images
Lord Leycester Hospital	Warwick	House	1481	10 January 1953	SP2802164742; 52°16′48″N 1°35′27″W	1035441	Lord Leycester Hospital More images
Egyptian urn in the garden of Lord Leycester Hospital	Warwick	Urn		19 March 1973	SP2800664765; 52°16′49″N 1°35′27″W	1364812	Egyptian urn in the garden of Lord Leycester Hospital More images
St James Chapel & West Gate	Warwick	Town Defences	Medieval	10 January 1953	SP2802764706; 52°16′47″N 1°35′26″W	1364802	St James Chapel & West Gate More images
St John's House	Warwick	House	1626	19 March 1973	SP2871965090; 52°17′00″N 1°34′50″W	1299845	St John's House More images
The Court House	Warwick	House	1724-1731	10 January 1953	SP2825264863; 52°16′52″N 1°35′14″W	1035450	The Court House More images
The Old Shire Hall and Law Courts	Warwick	Court House	1753-1758	10 January 1953	SP2812565049; 52°16′58″N 1°35′21″W	1184979	The Old Shire Hall and Law Courts More images
Town Wall (the Part extending North West from West Gate)	Warwick	Town Wall	Medieval	10 January 1953	SP2801164729; 52°16′48″N 1°35′27″W	1035505	Upload Photo
Warwick Castle	Warwick	Castle	Medieval	10 January 1953	SP2842464656; 52°16′46″N 1°35′05″W	1364805	Warwick Castle More images
Warwickshire County Council Offices and Former County Gaol	Warwick	Prison	c. 1680	10 January 1953	SP2807465048; 52°16′58″N 1°35′24″W	1364827	Warwickshire County Council Offices and Former County Gaol More images
56 High Street	Warwick	Cross Wing House	16th century	10 January 1953	SP2805364744; 52°16′48″N 1°35′25″W	1364811	56 High Street More images
Church of Saint Michael	Weston under Wetherley, Warwick	Parish Church	12th century	11 April 1967	SP3603469245; 52°19′12″N 1°28′22″W	1325524	Church of Saint Michael More images

== See also ==
- Grade II* listed buildings in Warwickshire
