= John Trapp (writer) =

English Bible commentator (1601–1669)

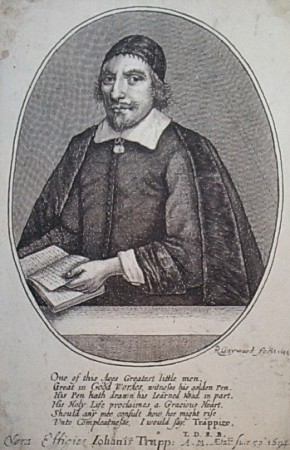
John Trapp

John Trapp (5 June 1601, in Croome D'Abitot – 16 October 1669, in Weston-on-Avon), was an English Anglican Bible commentator. His large five-volume commentary is still read today and is known for its pithy statements and quotable prose; his volumes are quoted frequently by other religious writers.

== Life ==
Son of Nicholas Trapp, of Kempsey, Worcestershire, Trapp studied at the Free School in Worcester and then at Christ Church, Oxford (B.A., 1622; M.A., 1624). He became usher of the free school of Stratford-upon-Avon in 1622 and its headmaster in 1624, and was made preacher at Luddington, near Stratford, before becoming vicar of Weston-on-Avon in Gloucestershire. He sided with parliament in the English Civil War and was arrested for a short time. He took the covenant of 1643 and acted as chaplain to the parliamentary soldiers in Stratford for two years. According to his own words, in the Commentary to Job, Job 9:5, in 1657 he was "here in Herefordshire". He served as rector of Welford-on-Avon in Gloucestershire between 1646 and 1660 and again as vicar of Weston from 1660 until his death in 1669. Trapp had married Mary Gibbard in 1624; they had eleven children. Their son Joseph (1638–1698), rector of Cherrington, Gloucestershire, was father of Joseph Trapp, first Oxford Professor of Poetry.

Be careful what books you read, for as water tastes of the soil it runs through, so does the soul taste of the authors that a man reads. -- John Trapp

He who rides to be crowned will not mind a rainy day. -- John Trapp

Unity without verity is no better than conspiracy -- John Trapp

Trapp's works have been quoted by religious writers including Charles Spurgeon (1834–1892). Ruth Graham, the daughter of Ruth Bell Graham, said that John Trapp, along with C.S. Lewis and George MacDonald, was one of her mother's three favorite sources for quotations.

== Works ==
- Annotations upon the Old and New Testament, in five distinct volumes (London, 1662)
- A brief commentary or exposition vpon the Gospel according to St John (London, 1646)
- A clavis to the Bible. Or A new comment upon the Pentateuch: or five books of Moses (London, 1650. [i.e. 1649])
- A commentary or exposition upon all the books of the New Testament (London, 1656)
- A commentary or exposition upon all the Epistles and the Revelation of John the Divine (London, 1647)
- A commentary or exposition upon the books of Ezra, Nehemiah, Esther, Job and Psalms (London, 1657)
- A commentary or exposition upon the four Evangelists, and the Acts of the Apostles (London, 1647)
- A commentary, or, exposition upon the XII. Minor prophets (London, 1654)
- A commentary or exposition upon these following books of holy Scripture; Proverbs of Solomon, Ecclesiastes, the Song of Songs, Isaiah, Jeremiah, Lamentations, Ezekiel & Daniel. Being a third volume of annotations upon the whole Bible. (London, 1660)
- Gods love-tokens, and the afflicted mans lessons: brought to light, and layd before him in two fruitfull and seasonable discourses upon Revel. 3. 19. Comforting under, and directing unto a right use of our personall, and publike crosses and calamities. (London, 1637)
- Solomonis panaretos: or, A commentarie upon the books of Proverbs, Ecclesiastes, and the Song of Songs (London, 1650) Download a scanned version from here.
- Theologia theologiæ, the true treasure; or A treasury of holy truths, touching Gods word, and God the word. Digg’d up, and drawn out of that incomparable mine of unsearchable mystery, Heb. I. 1, 2, 3. Wherein the divinity of the holy Scriptures is asserted, and applied. (London, 1641)
