= John Greville (died 1547) =

16th-century English politician

Sir John Greville (by 1492 – 25 November 1547) was an English Member of Parliament for Warwickshire in the 1539 parliament; the return for the 1542 election for Warwickshire has been lost and he may have been re-elected that year.

== Life ==
He was the eldest son of Sir Edward Greville and brother to Sir Fulke Greville (d. 10 November 1559), grandfather of the better-known Fulke Greville. His father was ward to Elizabeth Willoughby and John was initially suggested as a husband for her, but she preferred his brother Fulke and Edward agreed.

He is recorded as a gentleman in the household of Princess Mary (the future Mary I) in the Welsh Marches around 1526, though he later went on to support the English Reformation and to favour Protestant preachers. He succeeded to his father's titles on 22 July 1528 and was often nominated for High Sheriff of Warwickshire (even gaining a recommendation to it from Sir Thomas Audley in 1532) but never held the post. He is recorded as Justice of the Peace for Warwickshire in 1531 and five years later as a commissioner for the suppression of the monasteries, gaining Thomas Cromwell's support for his request for the tithes from Wellesbourne from the abbot of St Mary's Abbey, Kenilworth and in 1536 gaining a brief stay of execution for Polesworth Abbey via a plea to Cromwell. 1536 also saw him joining the king's forces against the Pilgrimage of Grace, whilst he also served in France in Henry VIII's 1544 campaign.

He was summoned before the Privy Council on allegations of cruelty towards his daughter and servant in 1541, though it is unknown if he was found guilty. He was knighted on 22 February 1547 at the coronation of Edward VI but was unable to campaign against the Scots that year, probably due to illness, and died in November. He was buried beneath a memorial brass in All Saints Church, Weston-on-Avon.

== Marriage and issue ==
Firstly to Elizabeth, daughter of John Spencer of Hodnell, Warwickshire, with whom he had Edward and Isabel; secondly to Eleanor Verney, daughter of Sir Ralph Verney of Pendley in Tring, Hertfordshire.
