= Weston-on-Avon =

Village in Warwickshire, England

Coordinates: 52.165°N 1.770°W

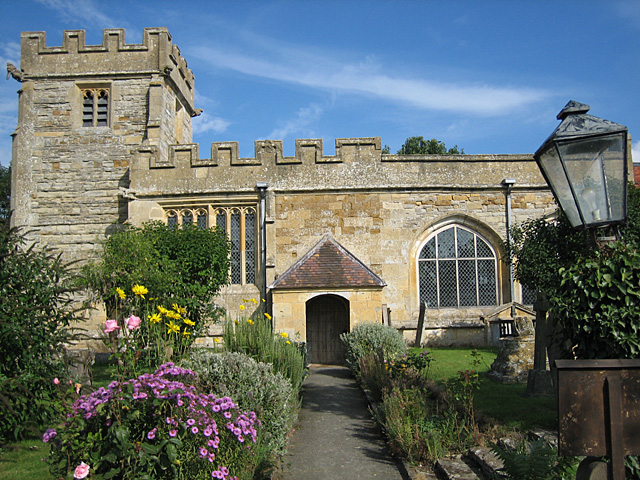
- All Saints Church

- Location within Warwickshire
- Population: 170 (2011 census)
- Civil parish: Weston-on-Avon
- District: Stratford-on-Avon
- Shire county: Warwickshire
- Region: West Midlands
- Country: England
- Sovereign state: United Kingdom
- Police: Warwickshire
- Fire: Warwickshire
- Ambulance: West Midlands

Weston-on-Avon is a village and civil parish in Stratford-on-Avon district, in Warwickshire, England. The population of the parish taken at the 2011 census was 170. It is about 3 miles (5 km) south-west of the town of Stratford-upon-Avon. It has a church called All Saints Church.

== History ==
Originally in Gloucestershire, Weston-on-Avon was transferred to Warwickshire in 1931. The Domesday Book recorded that Weston was one of about six villages in the area given to Hugh de Grandmesnil as reward for his help at the Battle of Hastings.

The same Hugh holds Weston-on-Avon.and Roger holds of him. There are four hides. Baldwin held it TRE. In demesne two ploughs and six villans with three ploughs. There are four slaves and five female slaves and a mill rendering ten shillings. It was worth £7, now £6.

== Notable people ==
- Robert Fisher Tomes, English farmer and zoologist, was born here on 4 August 1823.
- Sir John Greville, an MP in seven Parliaments, was buried here in 1444; there is also a stained glass window fragment showing him and his wife in St Peter's Church
- Sir John Tomes, English dentist and campaigned for the registration of dentists, was born here on 21 March 1815.
- John Trapp, vicar of Weston and Anglican Bible commentator, died here in 1669.
