= St Peter's Church, Binton =

Coordinates: 52.1840°N 1.7883°W

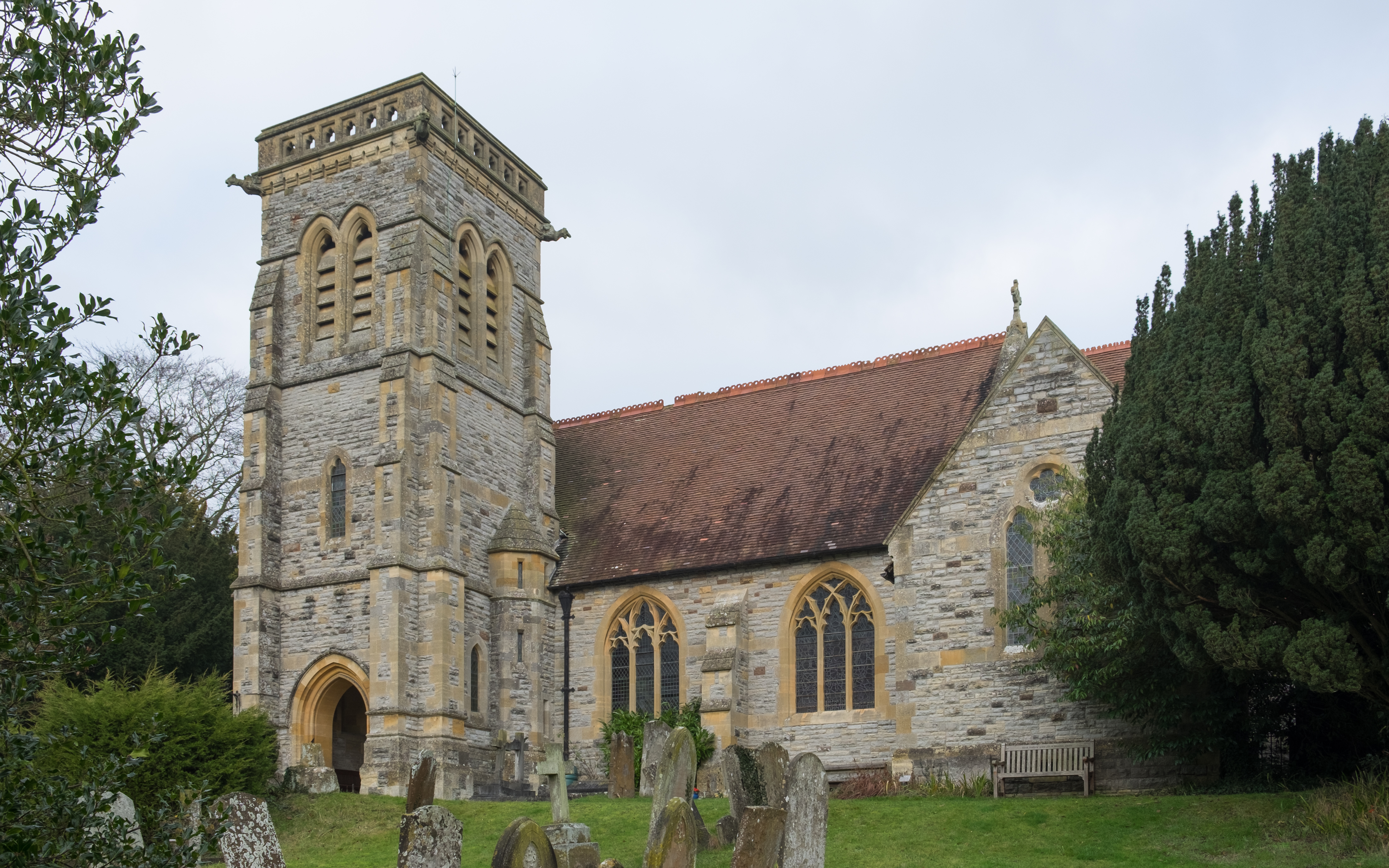
St Peter's Church 2017

St Peter's Church is the Anglican church in the village of Binton in Warwickshire.

== History ==
There has been a church on the site since at least 1286. The current church was built in 1875 and has views south over the river Avon, Warwickshire and the Cotswolds. It was built by the Conway family (the owners of the manor of Binton) and mainly paid for by the wife of Francis Seymour, 5th Marquess of Hertford. One 19th-century rector of the church had stated that the village's inhabitants were mainly agricultural workers and thus unable to contribute to the costs of maintaining the church, meaning he had to seek contributions from the local gentry instead.

Signs of the original church remain, however. A picture of the original church can be seen at the back of the current church. There is a 15th-century font and cover and a mediaeval parish chest with three locks and bound with iron bands. Furthermore, there is a stained-glass window in memory of Sir John Greville, who died in 1444 and was an MP in seven Parliaments. He is buried at All Saints Church, Weston-on-Avon. The window depicts the arms of the Greville family of Milcote. There is also a piece of wood depicting the royal coat of arms. It must date from 1714 to 1801 as it includes the White Horse of Hanover. Finally, by the gate to enter the churchyard, there are steps built into the wall, so as to avoid using the gate. The purpose of these was for people arriving to church by horseback could easily dismount, there is still a ring by these steps where the horses would be tied.

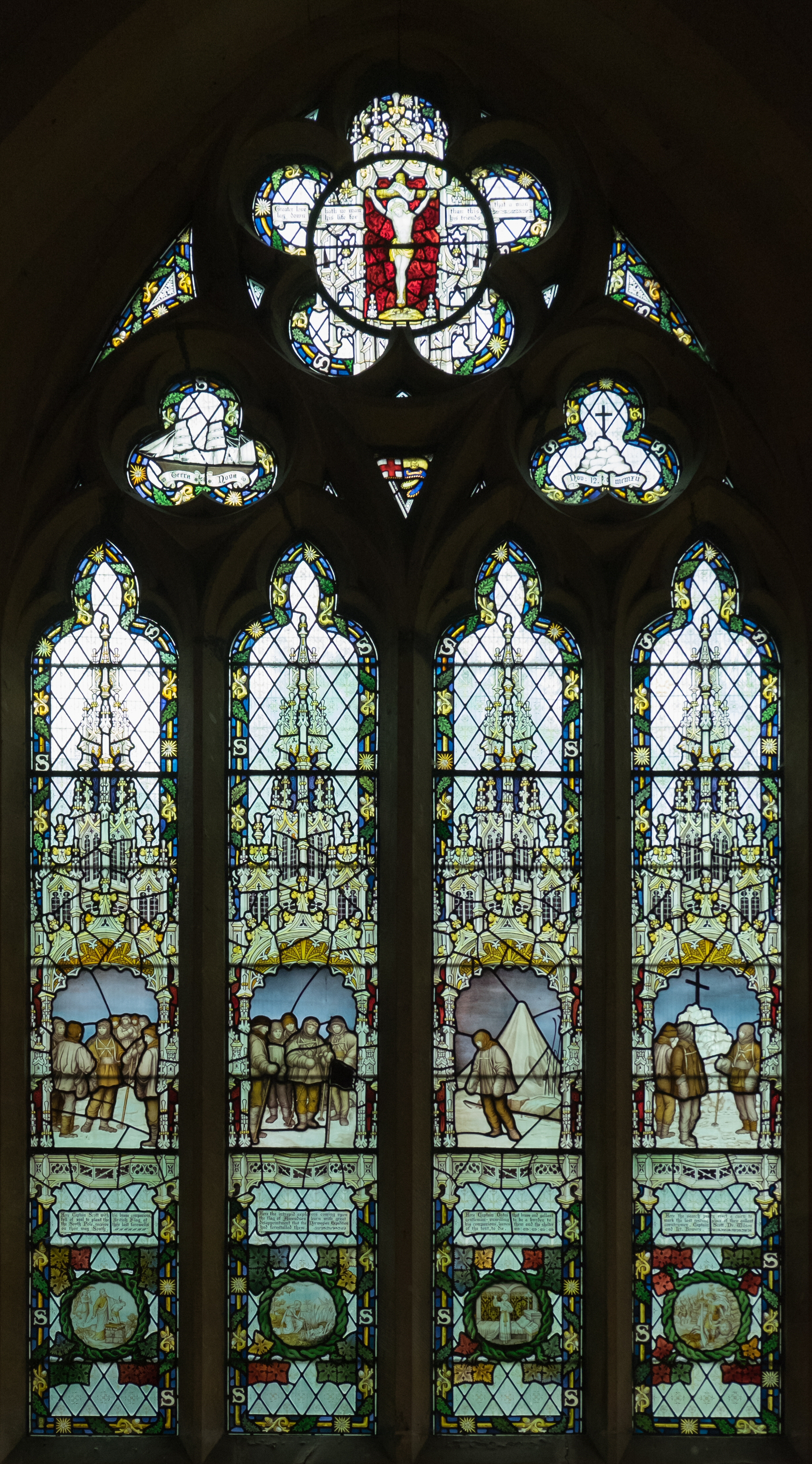
The Scott Window

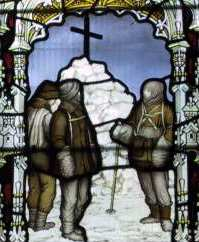
The Scott Window, panel 4 (detail): searchers erect a memorial cairn

The main feature of the church of St Peter is a memorial window by Kempe (1915), dedicated to Robert Falcon Scott and his co-explorers who died in their failed attempt to return from the South Pole. The window shows four scenes of the 1912 expedition. Scott had married Kathleen Bruce, sister of the Reverend Lloyd Harvey Bruce, Binton's rector 1906–24. Scott frequently visited the Rectory (now The Grange). Alongside the window is a memorial cross for the Revd Bruce, with a bronze sculpture of Christ designed by Kathleen.

The church has one bell, cast by Henry Bagley of Chacombe in 1669.

Just to the right of the church porch is the tomb of William Jackson and his wife, who lived in "Springback", now The Old Wellhouse. Jackson provided the stone wellhead known as “Buckwell” or “Lion’s Mouth" by piping water from a well in his own garden.

The church supports a colony of nesting swifts.

== Sources ==
- http://www.binton.org.uk/church-clubs-and-groups/st-peters-church/
