= Grade II* listed buildings in Warwickshire =

Warwickshire shown within England

The county of Warwickshire is divided into five districts. The districts of Warwickshire are North Warwickshire, Nuneaton and Bedworth, Rugby, Stratford-on-Avon, and Warwick.

As there are 356 Grade II* listed buildings in the county they have been split into separate lists for each district.

- Grade II* listed buildings in North Warwickshire
- Grade II* listed buildings in Nuneaton and Bedworth
- Grade II* listed buildings in Rugby (borough)
- Grade II* listed buildings in Stratford-on-Avon (district)
- Grade II* listed buildings in Warwick (district)

== See also ==
- Grade I listed buildings in Warwickshire
