= John Peche =

Sir John Peche (sometimes spelt Pecche) (c. 1285 in Wormleighton, Warwickshire, England – before 1335 in Honiley, Warwickshire, England) was Lord Warden of the Cinque Ports from 1323 to 1324. He died about 1335. Sir John Peche was the son and heir of Richard Peche and Hawisia de Arden, and a great-grandson of Robert Peche. He was in the king's service in Scotland almost continuously from January 1297/8 till 1304. He served in various capacities in County Warwick from 1317 to 1321. He was summoned to Parliament from 15 May 1321 to 22 January 1335/6, by writs directed Johanni Pecche, whereby he is said to have become Lord Pecche. He was appointed keeper of the town and castle of Warwick, in 1321, and later was ordered to raise forces in County Warwick and lend them to the king. He kept the castle until July 1326. He fought at the Battle of Boroughbridge 16 March 1321/2, as a banneret, on the king's side. He was summoned for service in Scotland in 1322 and 1323, and for service in Gascony, in person, 1324 and 1325. In 1323 he was appointed Constable of Dover Castle, Warden of the Cinque Ports he was superseded in that capacity 21 May 1324, and Governor of Corfe Castle. As a knight of Counties Warwick and Gloucester he was summoned to the Great Council at Westminster 30 May 1324, and in June, 1328, he was summoned to Council at York, and in 1329 to a conference at Windsor.

== Family ==
Sir John Peche married (1st) an unknown wife. They had five sons, John, Knt., Nicholas, Knt. (of Hampton-in-Arden and Honiley, Warwickshire), Edmund, Ralph and Thomas, Knt. (of Shenington, Oxfordshire). He married (2nd), in or before 1326, Eleanor, widow of Ralph de Gorges, Knt., 1st Lord Gorges. She was living in July 1341.

Preceded by The Earl of Kent	Lord Warden of the Cinque Ports; 1323–1325	Succeeded by The Lord Basset de Drayton
