= Church of St Mary Magdalene, Tanworth-in-Arden =

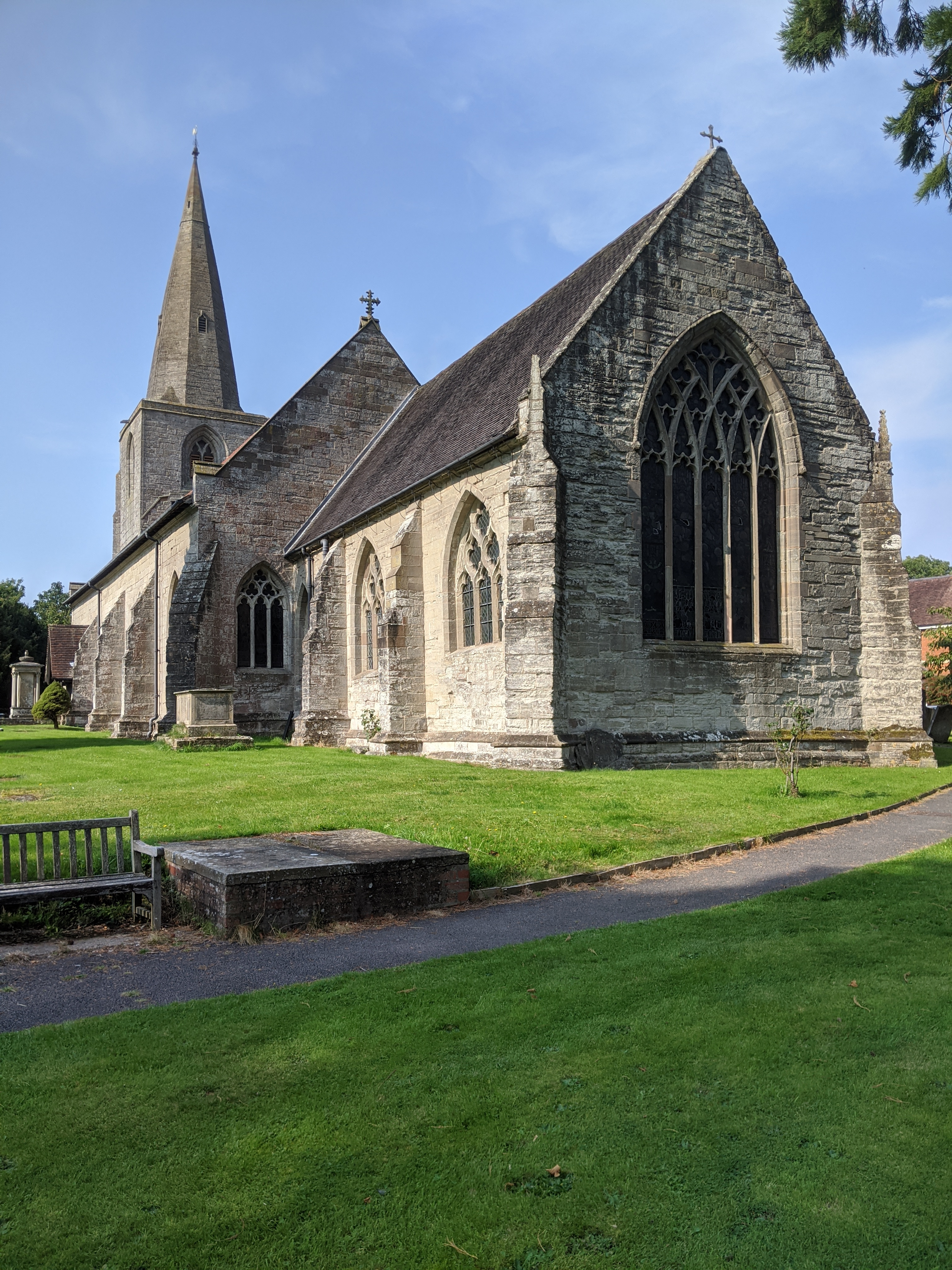
- Church of St Mary Magdalene, Tanworth-in-Arden
- 52°19′57.36″N 1°50′05.64″W
- OS grid reference: SP 11348 70513
- Location: Tanworth-in-Arden, Warwickshire
- Country: England
- Denomination: Church of England

History
- Dedication: Mary Magdalene

Architecture
- Heritage designation: Grade I
- Designated: 5 April 1967

Administration
- Diocese: Birmingham

Listed Building – Grade I
- Official name: Church of St Mary Magdalene
- Designated: 5 April 1967
- Reference no.: 1382445

The Church of St Mary Magdalene is an Anglican church in the village of Tanworth-in-Arden, in Warwickshire, England, and in the Diocese of Birmingham. The building dates from the 13th and 14th centuries, with modifications in the 18th and 19th centuries. It is Grade I listed.

== History and description ==
There is a chancel, a nave with a wide north aisle, porches and a west tower with a spire.

The church was built in the period from the 13th century to about 1330–40. It is thought there was originally a chapel built in the early 13th century, where the north aisle now stands; the windows were replaced in the late 13th century with larger windows. The building was soon afterwards enlarged, with the construction of the nave, tower and chancel. The wide east window of the north aisle, 18 inches (46 cm) wider than that of the chancel, was formerly the east window of the chapel; windows in the south wall of the chapel were moved to the west half of the nave.

The spire was rebuilt 6 feet (1.8 m) higher in 1720. In 1790, the arcade between the nave and the north aisle was removed, a gallery was erected across the west wall, and the north and south porches were removed and new doorways made, opening into entrance areas under the gallery. In 1880, the arcade was rebuilt, the gallery was removed, and the north porch was rebuilt. The south porch is more recent.

=== Monuments ===
There are several brass memorials on the interior walls of the church.

There is a large marble monument to Thomas Archer (died 1685), his wife Anne (died 1685), and Elizabeth (died 1703, aged 29), the wife of Andrew Archer, who erected the monument. There is a neo-classical wall monument to Andrew Archer, 2nd Baron Archer (died 1778), designed by John Hickey.

== Churchyard ==
The graves of the singer-songwriter Nick Drake, and the racing driver Mike Hailwood, are in the churchyard.

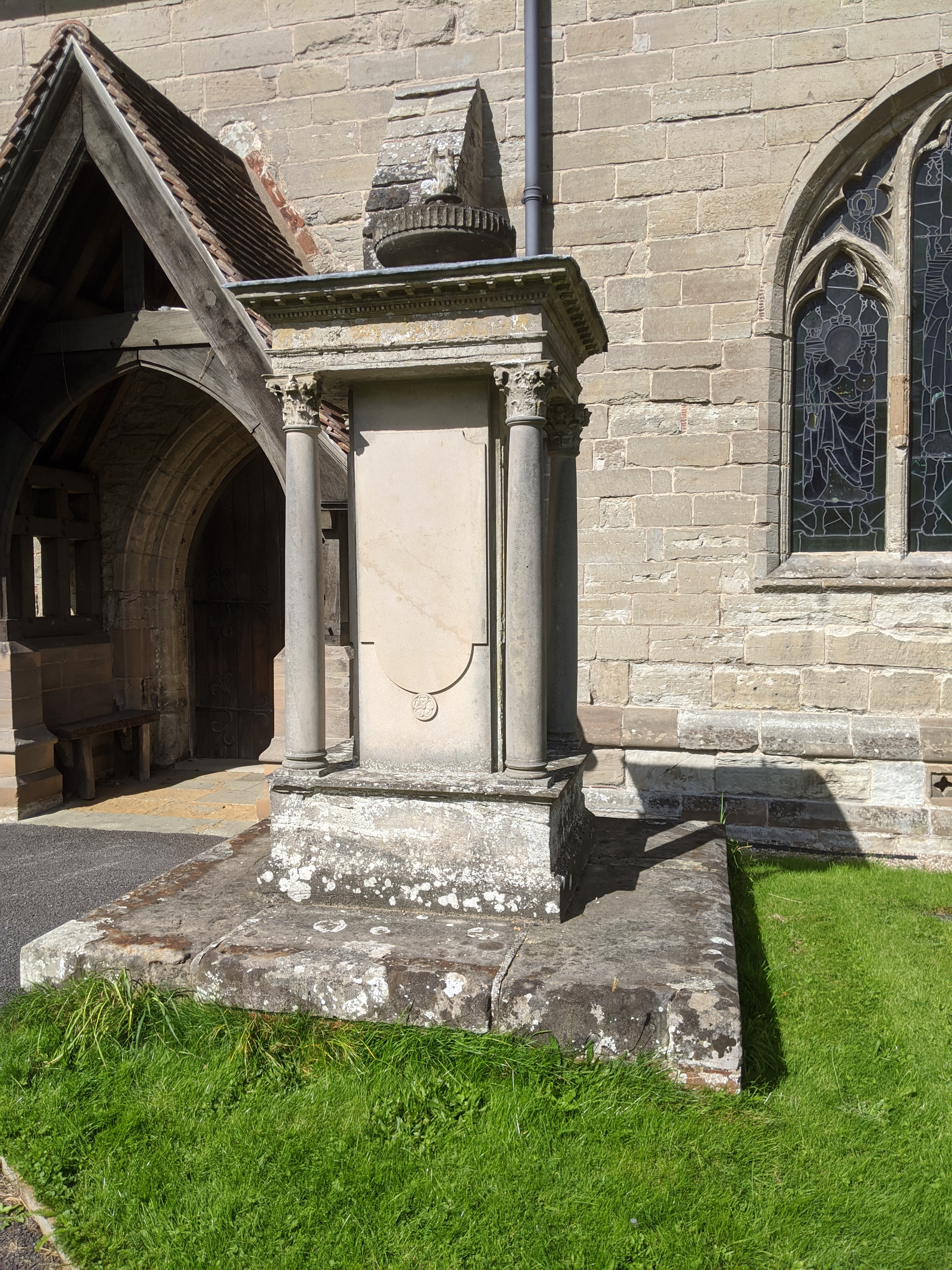
The monument to Richard Lea

The following monuments in the churchyard are Grade II-listed: Near the south porch is a monument, in neo-classical style, to Richard Lea (died 1818). It was restored in 1993. There is a chest tomb to Sarah Humphries (died 1793) about 11 metres south of the porch. About 2 metres south of the chancel is a chest tomb in neo-classical style, a memorial to John Horton of Elliotts Hall (died 1817). A chest tomb 9 metres south of the chancel is probably late 18th-century; its inscription is eroded. A chest tomb to Elizabeth, wife of Richard Field of Blackford (died 1819) is about 12 metres south of the chancel.

== See also ==
- Grade I listed buildings in Warwickshire
