= All Saints Church, Weston-on-Avon =

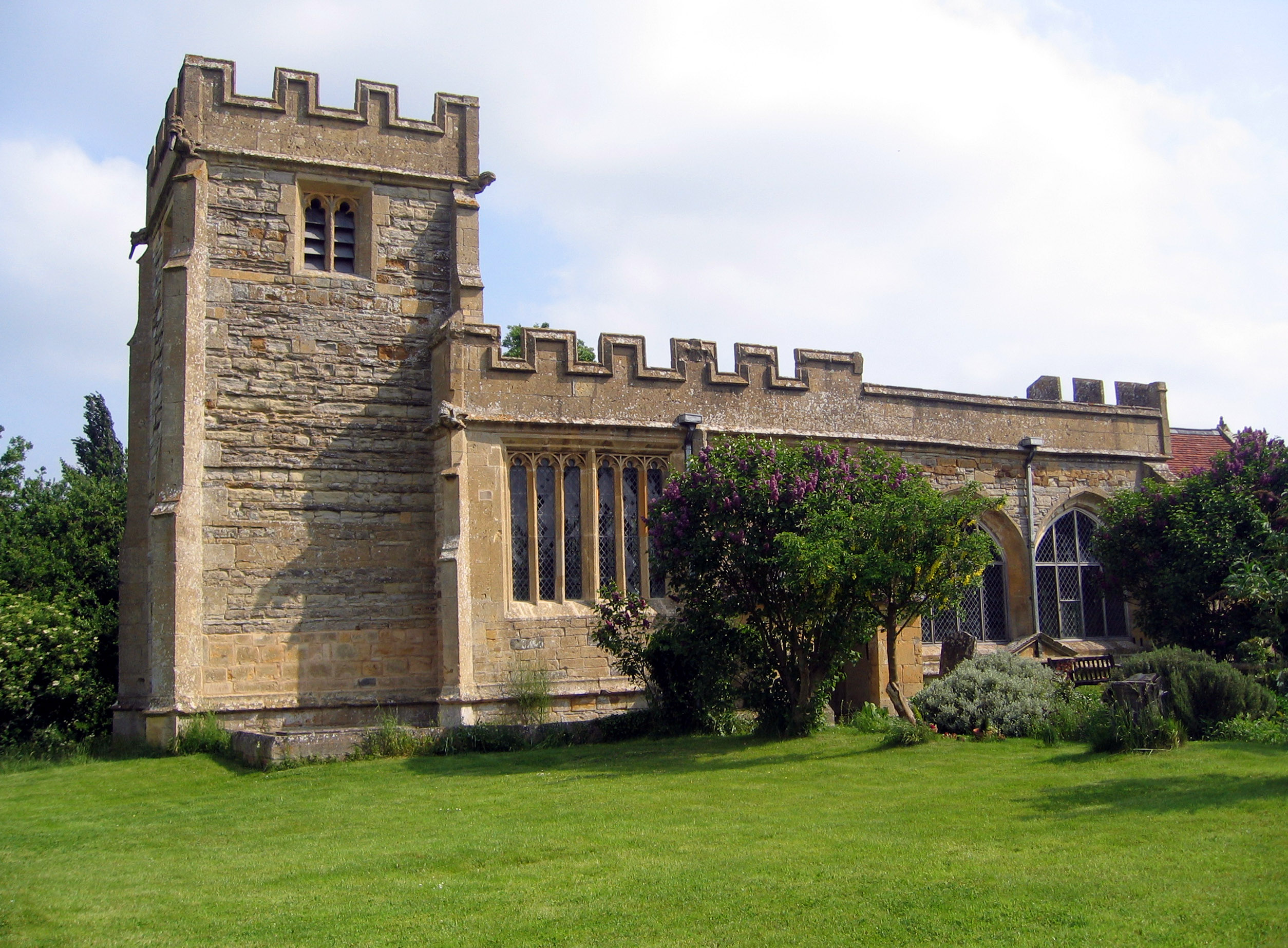
- All Saints Church, Weston-on-Avon from the south
- All Saints Church, Weston-on-Avon
- 52.165°N 1.7678°W
- OS grid reference: SP 159 519
- Location: Weston-on-Avon, Warwickshire
- Country: England
- Denomination: Anglican
- Website: All Saints Weston

History
- Status: Parish church
- Dedication: All Saints

Architecture
- Functional status: Active
- Architectural type: Church
- Style: Perpendicular

Specifications
- Materials: Blue lias, some pebble-dashing, tiled roof

Administration
- Province: Canterbury
- Diocese: Gloucester
- Archdeaconry: Cheltenham
- Deanery: Camden
- Parish: Weston

Listed Building – Grade I
- Official name: Church of All Saints
- Designated: 5 April 1967
- Reference no.: 1382865

All Saints Church is in the small village of Weston-on-Avon, Warwickshire, England. The church is recorded in the National Heritage List for England as a designated Grade I listed building. It is an active Anglican parish church in the diocese of Gloucester, the archdeaconry of Cheltenham and the deanery of the North Cotswolds. Its benefice 'RiverVale Churches' is combined with those of St Peter's, Welford, St Swithin's, Quinton and St James The Great, Long Marston, Warwickshire.

== History ==
The earliest documentary evidence of a church on the site is in 1283, although it is likely that there was a church at an earlier date. Most of the present church dates from the mid-15th century, although part of the chancel is possibly older. A chapel dedicated to St Anne was demolished, probably in the 16th century at the time of suppression of chantry chapels in the 16th century. The south porch was added in the early 18th century and a restoration was carried out in 1899.

== Architecture ==
=== Exterior ===
The church is built in blue lias, parts of which are covered in pebbledash, and the dressings are of ashlar. The roof is tiled. The plan consists of a four-bay nave, a two-bay chancel, a west tower and a south porch. The tower is short and has no string courses. At the top four corners are gargoyles, three of which depict winged monsters, the other a human being playing a recorder. The west window has four lights with Perpendicular tracery. The bell-openings have two lights and louvres. At the corners are diagonal buttresses and at the northeast of the tower is a stair turret. At its top is a cornice and crenellations. The north wall of the nave has a six-light straight-headed window in each bay. Two lights of one of these windows contains stained glass depicting a large number of little ships. Between the windows is a blocked north doorway. The window in the western bay of the south wall has a six-light window similar to those in the north wall. The porch is in the next bay and the windows in the other two bays contain arches filed with glass which used to be the arches between the chapel and the nave. At the east end of the nave wall is a squint with two trefoil-headed openings. Around the top of the nave is a cornice. The north and east sides are fully crenellated but the crenellations on the south wall are only above the two western bays. The chancel is lower and narrower than the nave and is gabled. The east window is arched with three lights and Perpendicular tracery. In the north wall of the chancel is a three-light straight-headed window and in the south wall there is a similar window with a priest's door to its west.

=== Interior ===
The font is octagonal and dates from the 19th century. The pulpit and choir stalls date from the early 20th century and the organ from 1960. On the floor to the southeast of the pulpit are medieval encaustic tiles. In the nave is a 17th century bier. On the chancel floor are memorial brasses to Sir John Greville who died in 1547 and Sir Edward Greville who died in 1559, both of whom were Lords of the Manor of Milcote. On the wall are three early 19th century memorial tablets to members of the Adkins family, also of Milcote. There is a single bell, dating from the mid-15th century, which is inscribed with a cross and the word Gabriel.

== External features ==
In the churchyard is the base of a medieval cross made from limestone ashlar which is listed at Grade II. Also listed at Grade II are two chest tombs which probably date from the late 17th century.
