= Church of St Peter and St Paul, Long Compton =

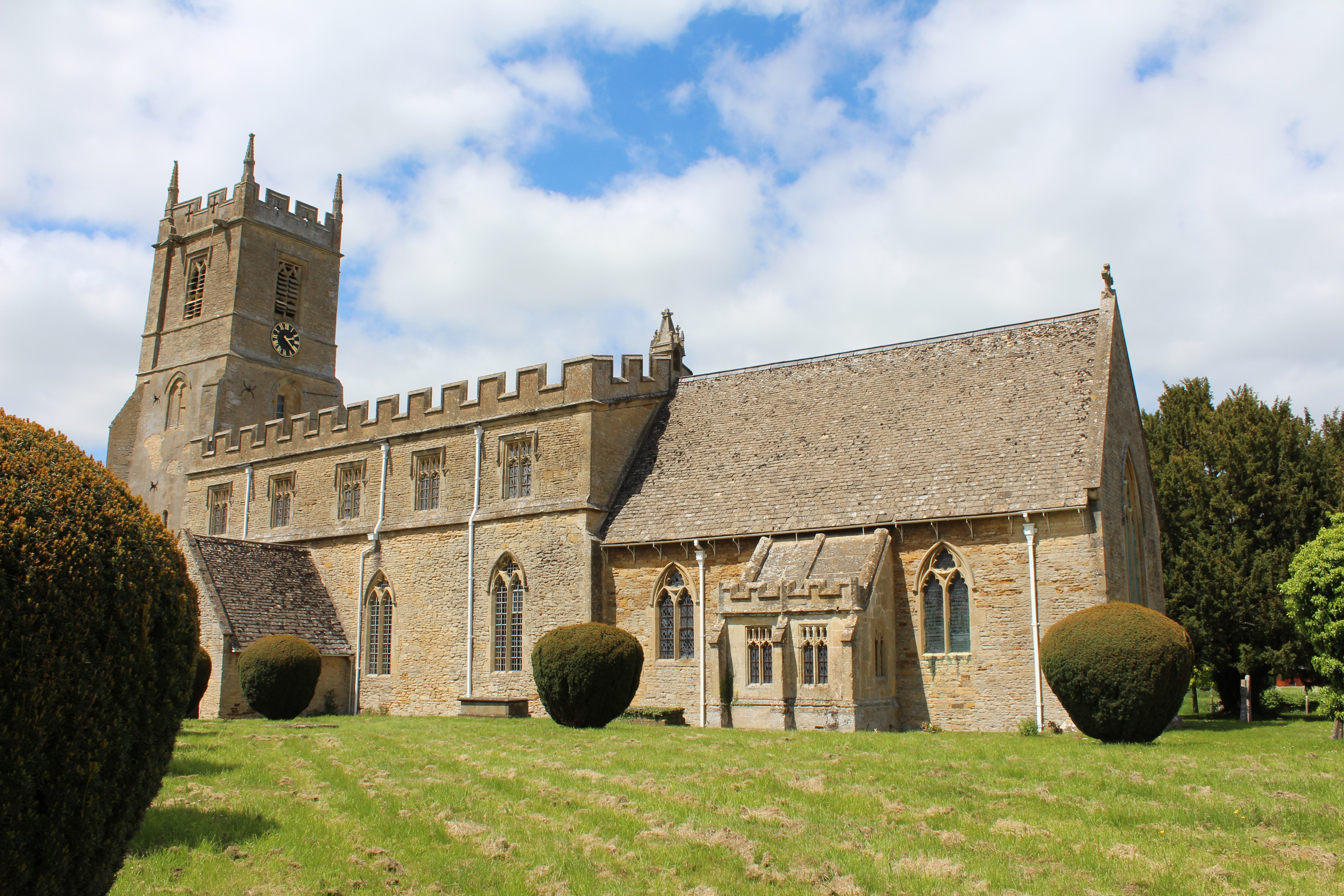
- Church of St Peter and St Paul, Long Compton
- 51°59′42″N 1°34′57.79″W
- OS grid reference: SP 28747 33033
- Location: Long Compton, Warwickshire
- Country: England
- Denomination: Church of England
- Website: www.southwarwickshirechurches.co.uk/churches/long-compton-st-peter-and-st-paul

Administration
- Diocese: Diocese of Coventry

Listed Building – Grade I
- Official name: Church of St Peter and St Paul
- Designated: 13 October 1966
- Reference no.: 1355491

Listed Building – Grade II
- Official name: The Lychgate
- Designated: 2 September 1952
- Reference no.: 1116280

The Church of St Peter and St Paul is an Anglican church in the village of Long Compton, in Warwickshire, England. It is in the Diocese of Coventry, and is one of seven churches in the South Warwickshire Benefice. The building, dating from the early 13th century, is Grade I listed.

== Description ==
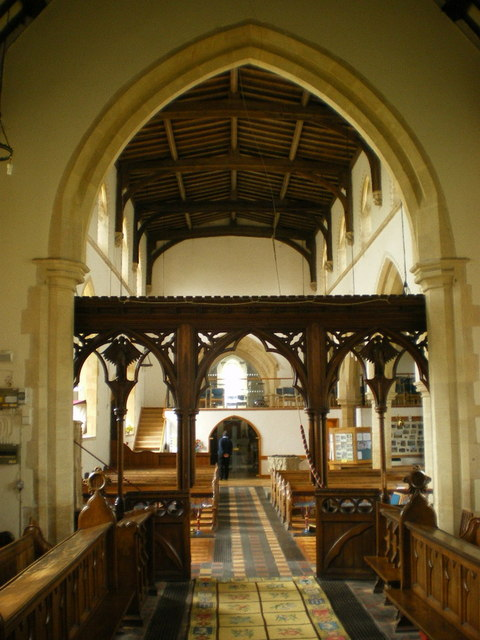
Interior, looking west from the chancel

There was an earlier church, perhaps made of wood, on the same site. The oldest parts of the present church are of the early 13th century. There is a nave with a north aisle, a western tower, a chancel and a south porch.

The tower has three stages: the lower two are late 13th-century, with a 15th-century upper stage, probably contemporary with the clerestory of the nave. It has an embattled parapet with crocketted pinnacles in the corners. Below the parapet there are gargoyles to the north and south, with animal heads, serving as water outlets.

The nave roof is low-pitched and has an embattled parapet. There is a Sanctus bell, dating from the 16th century, above the east gable of the nave, in a restored bellcote. Internally the roof of the nave is constructed with purlins and tie-beams, and is supported on the nave walls by carved corbels, which include a mitred bishop's head, a lady with a headdress, a priest, and angels.

The chancel was rebuilt in the late 13th or early 14th century, and it has a roof with stone slates. A chantry chapel was added in the 15th century to the south wall of the chancel, between the south windows. It is now a vestry. It has two small bays and an embattled parapet.

The north aisle was built in the early 14th century, and the porch is of the late 14th century. By the east wall of the porch is a badly worn stone monument, showing a recumbent figure of a woman, thought to be of the 14th century, probably once inside the church.

There was restoration in 1862–63 by Henry Woodyer, particularly of the chancel, and a rood screen was installed.

After a flood in the village in 1998, which caused irreparable damage to the church rooms in Vicarage Lane, the west end of the church was altered to provide a meeting room, toilet, kitchen and lobby. The new facilities were opened in 2004 by the Bishop of Coventry, Colin Bennetts.

=== Bells ===
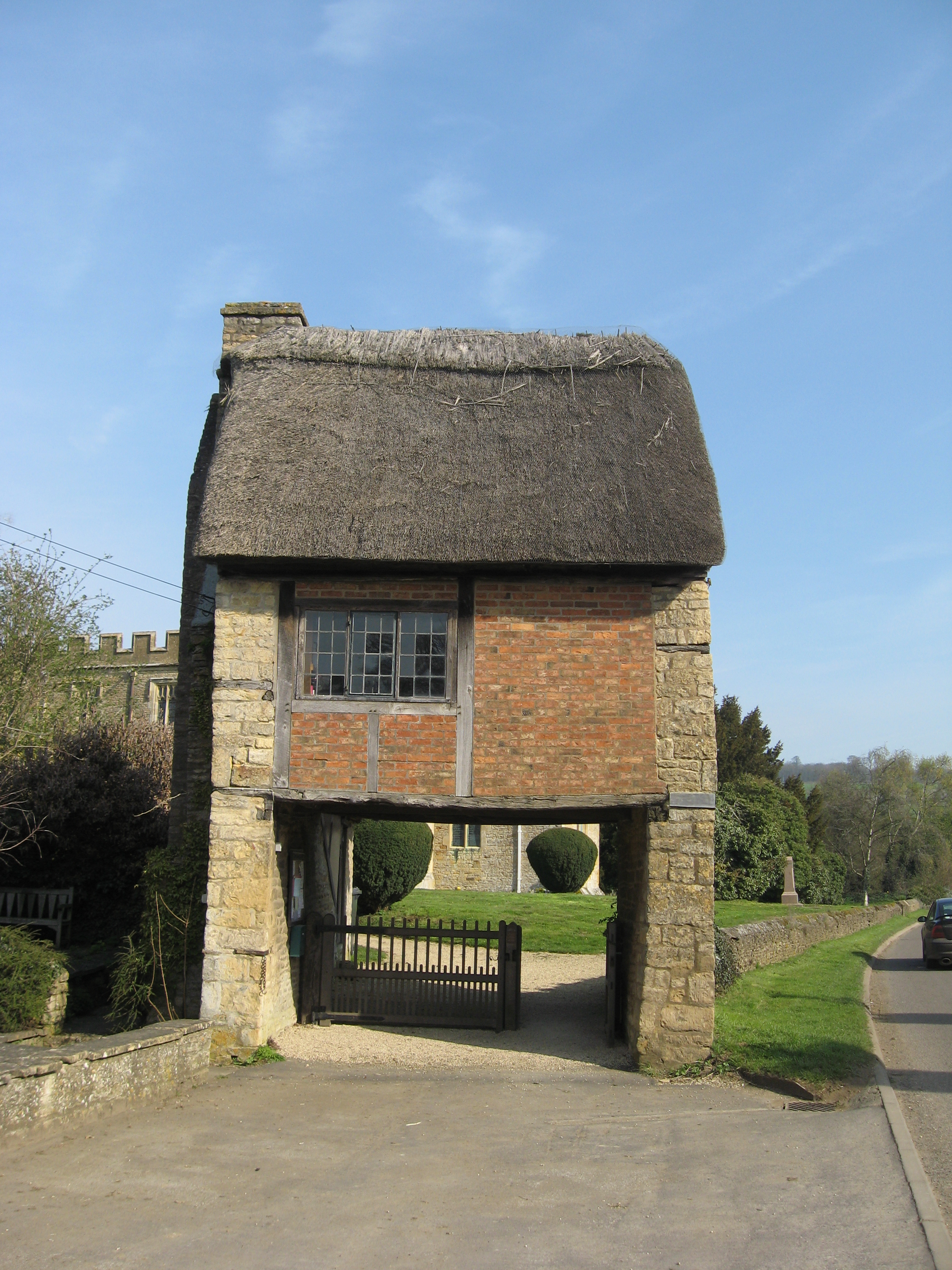
The lychgate

There are six bells; the oldest, both trebles, are by James and Richard Keene of Woodstock, dated 1652. Originally the complete ring of five or six were by James and Richard Keene. The fourth bell is by W & J Taylor of Oxford, dated 1823. The sixth is by Henry Bagley III of Chacombe, dated 1731. The third and fifth bells, originally by Henry Bagley III, were recast by Thomas Bond and Sons of Burford in 1924.

=== Lychgate ===
The lychgate, a Grade II listed building, has a room above the gate and a thatched roof. It was originally the end of a row of cottages; most of which were demolished in the early 20th century. It was rebuilt and given to the church in 1964 by a past resident, George Latham, as a memorial to his wife Marion.
