= St Peter's Church, Wormleighton =

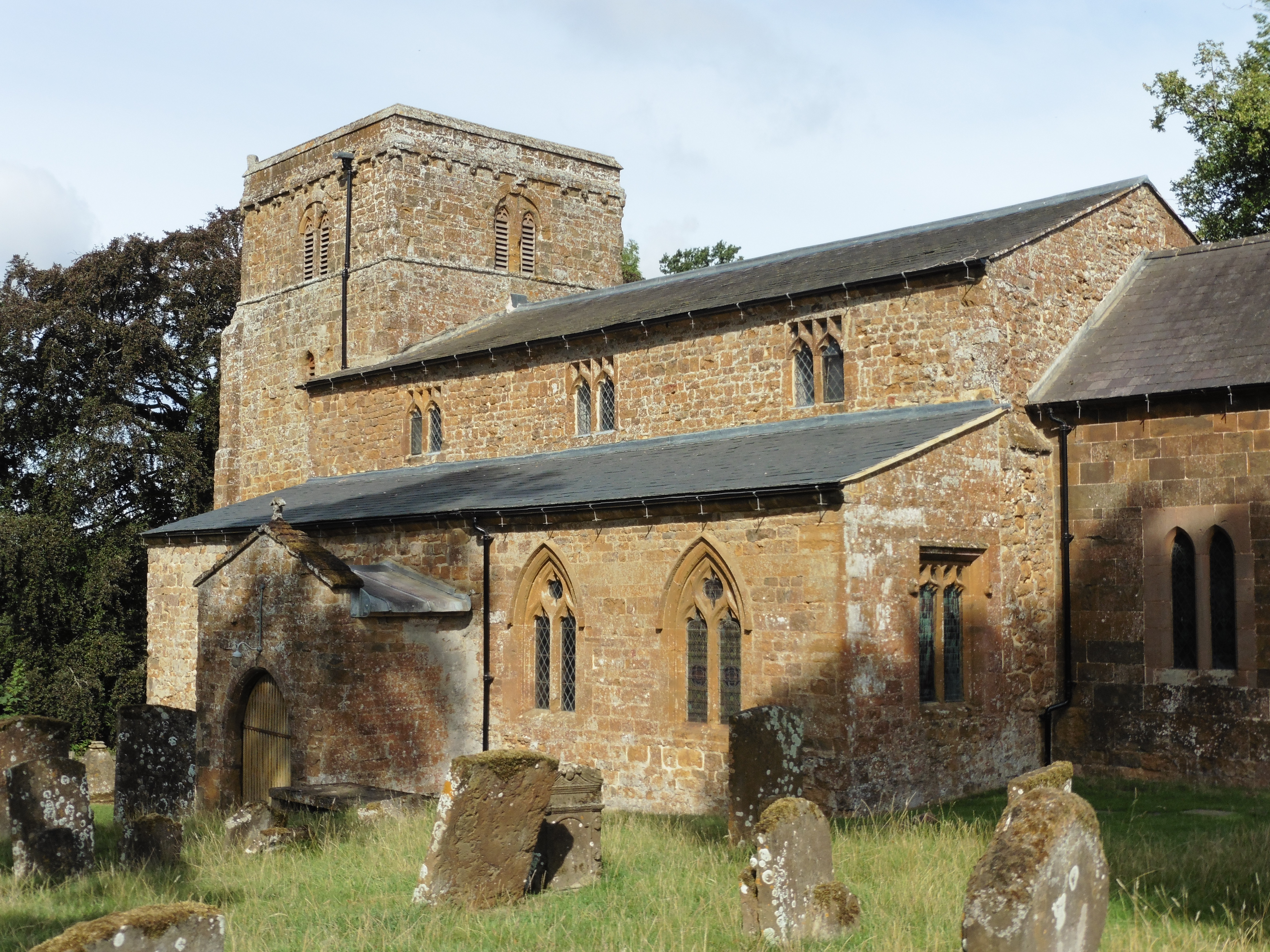
- St Peter's Church, Wormleighton
- 52°10′54.12″N 1°20′47.9″W
- OS grid reference: SP 44770 53914
- Location: Wormleighton, Warwickshire
- Country: England
- Denomination: Church of England

Architecture
- Heritage designation: Grade I
- Designated: 30 May 1967

Administration
- Diocese: Diocese of Coventry

Listed Building – Grade I
- Official name: Church of St Peter
- Designated: 30 May 1967
- Reference no.: 1299347

St Peter's Church is an Anglican church in the village of Wormleighton, in Warwickshire, England. It is in the Diocese of Coventry and in the Bridges group of parishes. The building, dating from the 12th century and largely unaltered from the medieval period, is Grade I listed.

== Description ==
There is a nave with north and south aisles, chancel, west tower and south porch. The earliest parts are of the 12th century; the tower and narrow aisles, with three bays, were added in the late 12th or early 13th century.

The clerestory dates from the 15th century. and the south porch is of the 14th or 15th century.

In the west part of the nave and aisle floor are medieval encaustic tiles, originally from Stoneleigh Abbey. A seat in the nave has a back which was originally a 15th-century screen, with six bays of panelling. The font, with a circular tapering bowl, is of the 13th century and later recut.

=== Chancel ===
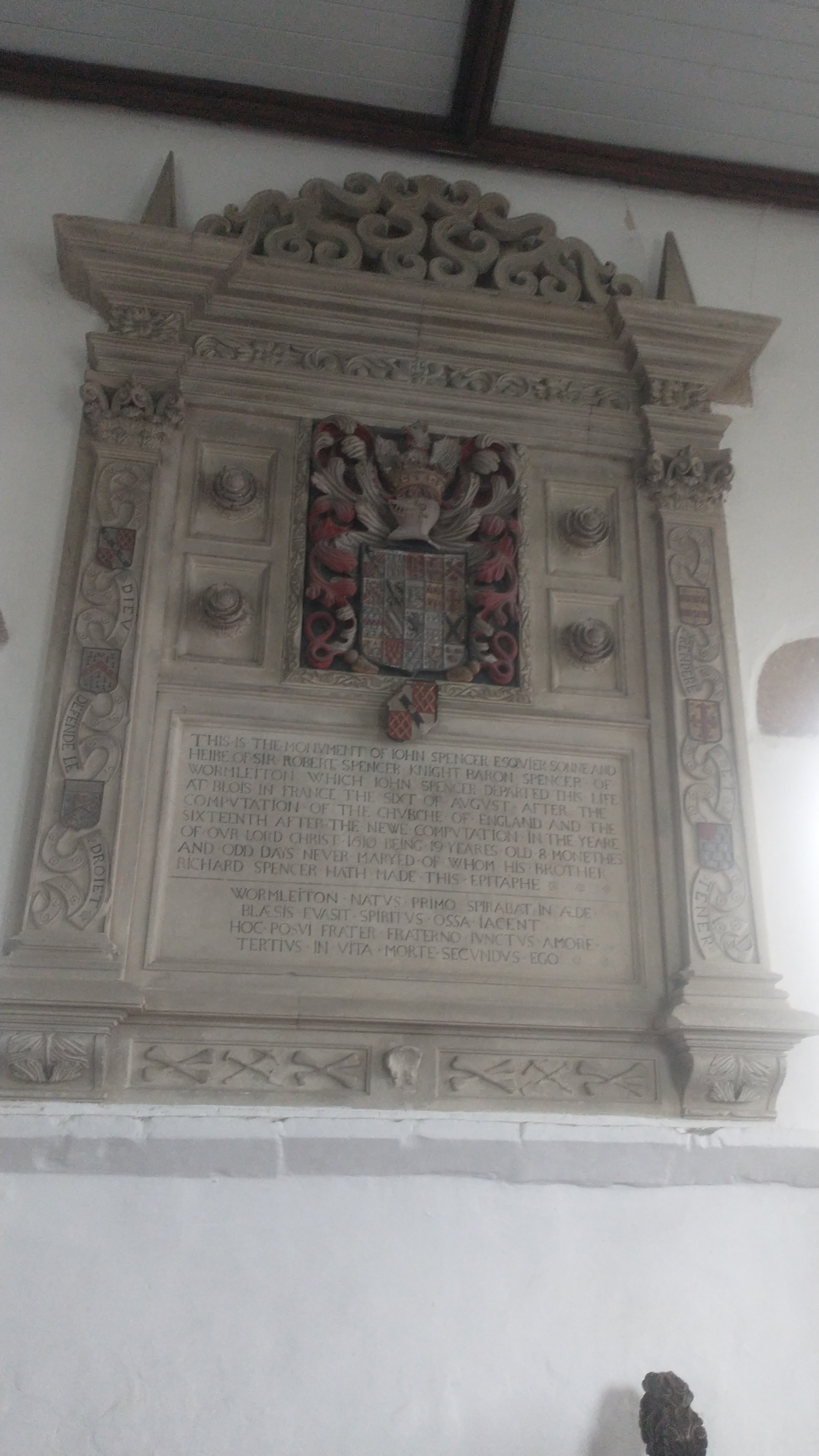
Monument to John Spencer

The chancel was enlarged in the 13th century; the side windows are of the 14th century and the east window of the 15th century. The east and south walls were rebuilt in the 18th century.

The rood screen, dating from the 15th century, has three bays either side of the doorway to the chancel. Between the arches of the bays there are corbels on which there are carvings of crowned men's heads, said to have been added in the 17th century; one has an early representation of a man wearing spectacles. The rood loft canopy is said to have once been part of a musicians' gallery in the manor house at Warmington.

There are long benches dating from the 15th century in the chancel, with finely carved bench ends: details include a dog, two bishops back to back, and a winged figure back to back with an eagle.

In the north wall of the chancel is a stone monument to John, eldest son of Robert Spencer, 1st Baron Spencer of Wormleighton. John died in Blois in 1610, aged 19. Above a panel bearing an inscription is a large achievement of arms of the Spencer family.

=== Bells ===
There are three bells: the tenor is by Henry Bagley I of Chacombe, 1642, the second by Robert Mellours of Nottingham, 1522, the third by Hugh Watts of Leicester, 1617. They are regarded as unringable, because of the heavily worn condition of the bearings and the worn clapper of the tenor bell.
