= Wormleighton =

Village in Warwickshire, England

Coordinates: 52°11′N 1°21′W

Wormleighton is a village in Warwickshire, England. It sits on Wormleighton Hill overlooking the River Cherwell. The population taken at the 2011 census was 183.

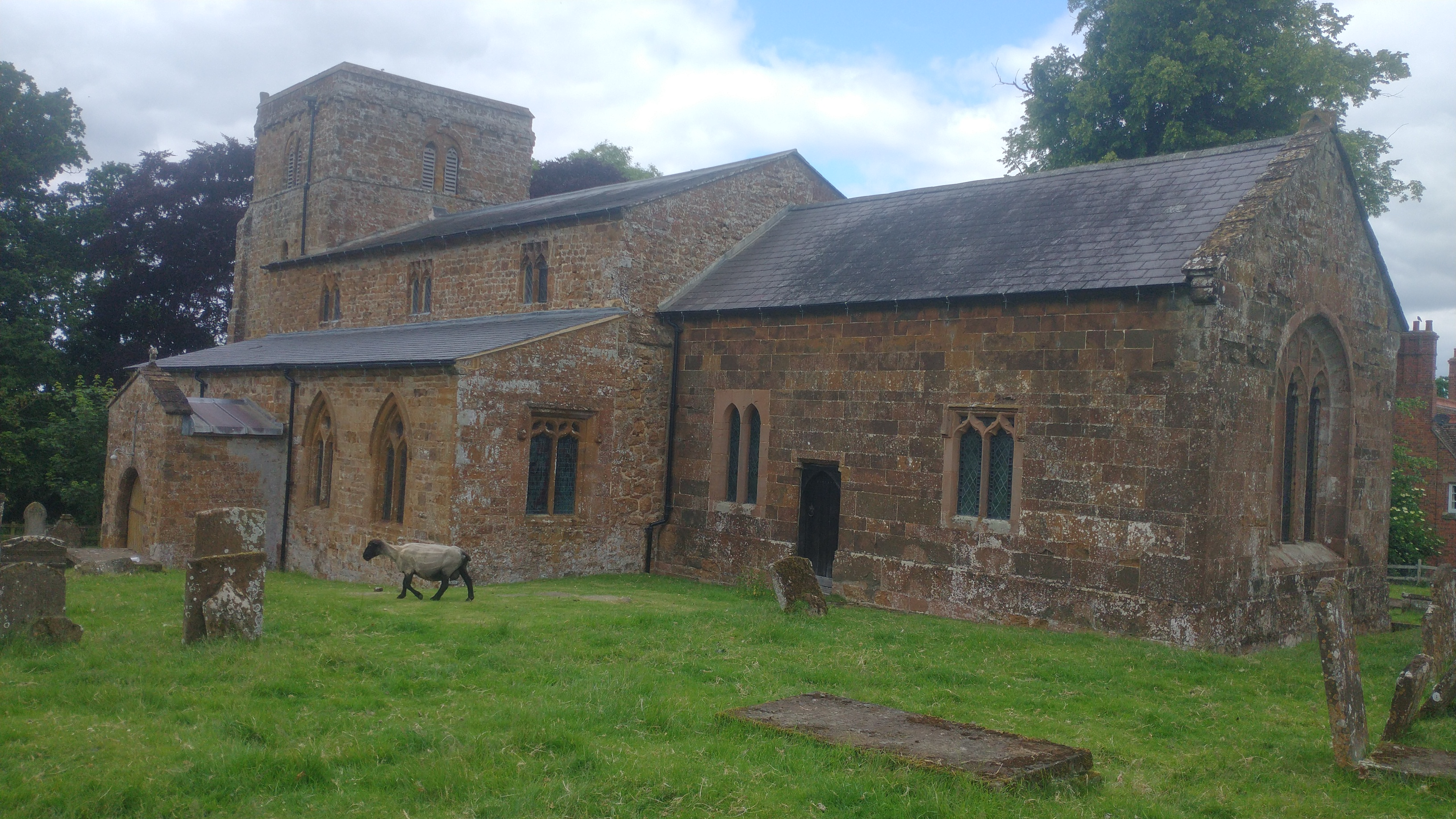
St Peter's Church, Wormleighton

The original village was on the banks of the Cherwell and can still be seen as a series of humps and hollows on the east bank of the Oxford Canal.

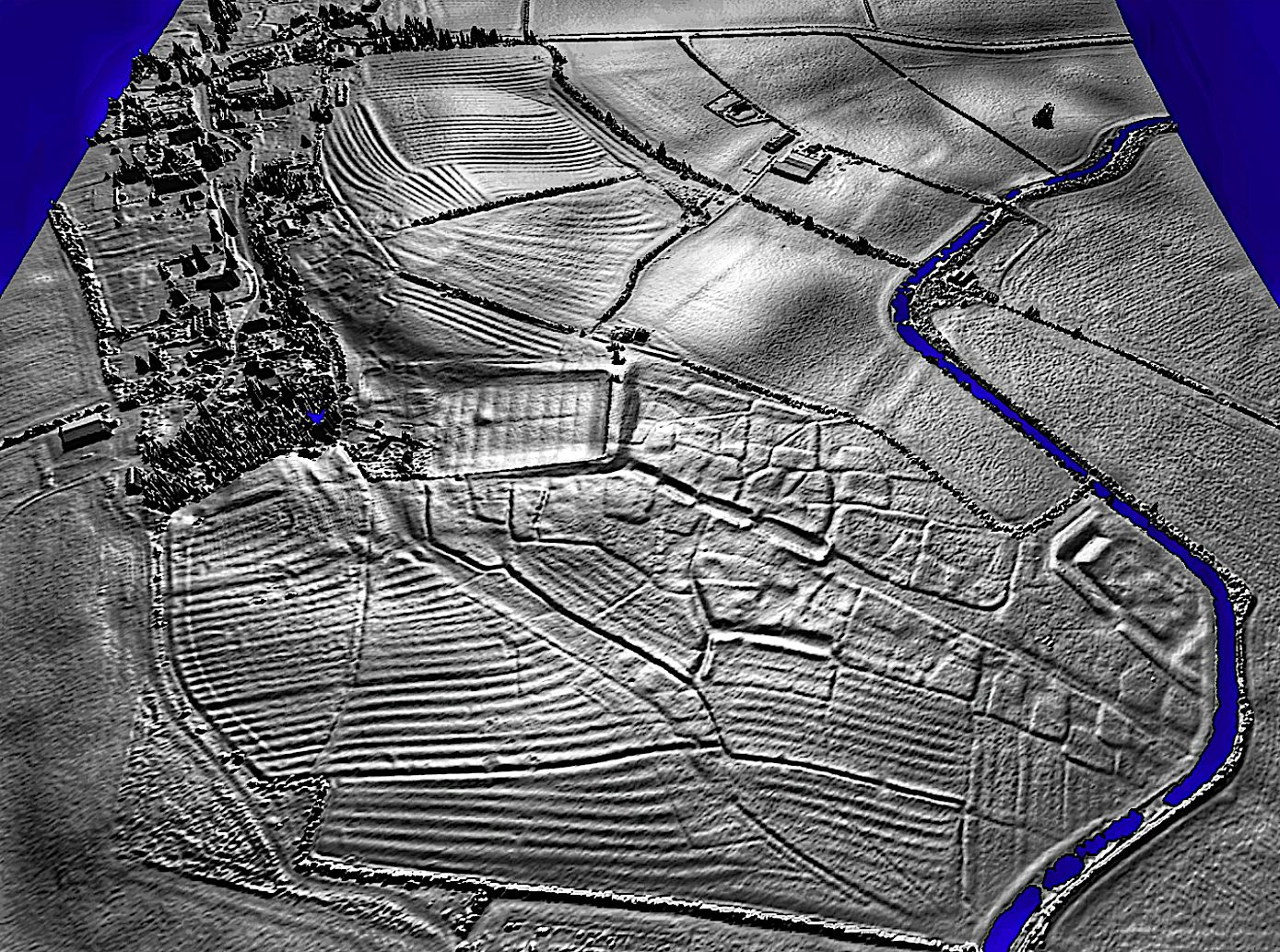
A lidar view of the site of the original village of Wormleighton.

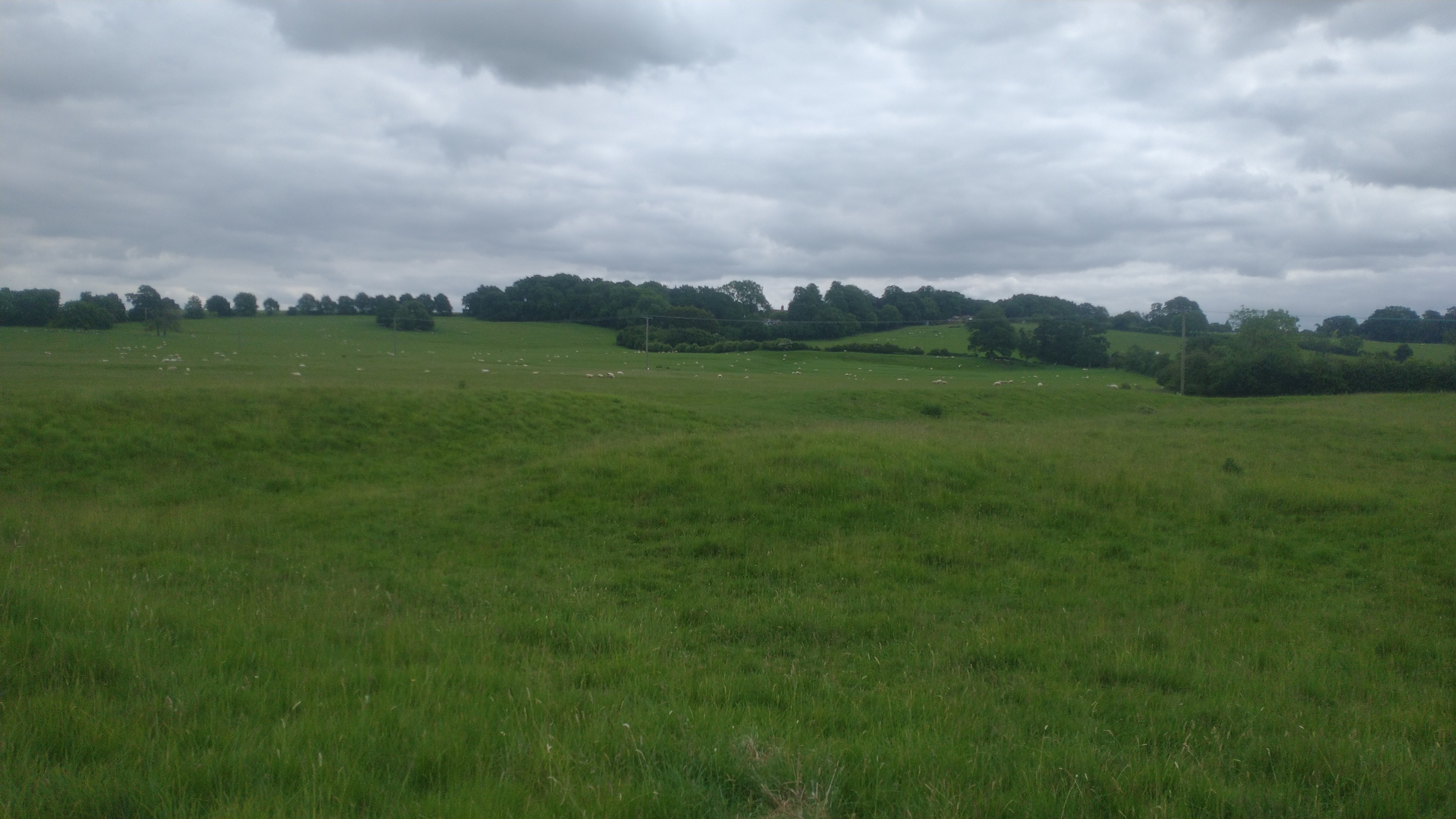
Humps and depressions are all that remains of the original Wormleighton Village

The present village sits on the crest of the hill. At one end is St Peter's Church, which has a Norman tower and nave, with small added Gothic aisles, made of local ironstone. The Church has remaining box pews, a Norman font, and an interesting tomb to Robert Spencer which gives his death date in 1610 (he died in France) both in the new Gregorian calendar (used in France from 1582) and in the old Julian calendar which was still used in Britain until 1752. The church is surrounded by its graveyard, which is accessible to local sheep. A path from the church leads to the remains of the old 16th-century manor house, Wormleighton Manor, of which the first view is a fine old chimney, then the great hall can be seen, part made of stone, part of brick. The gatehouse is Jacobean, and has a date of 1613 upon it.

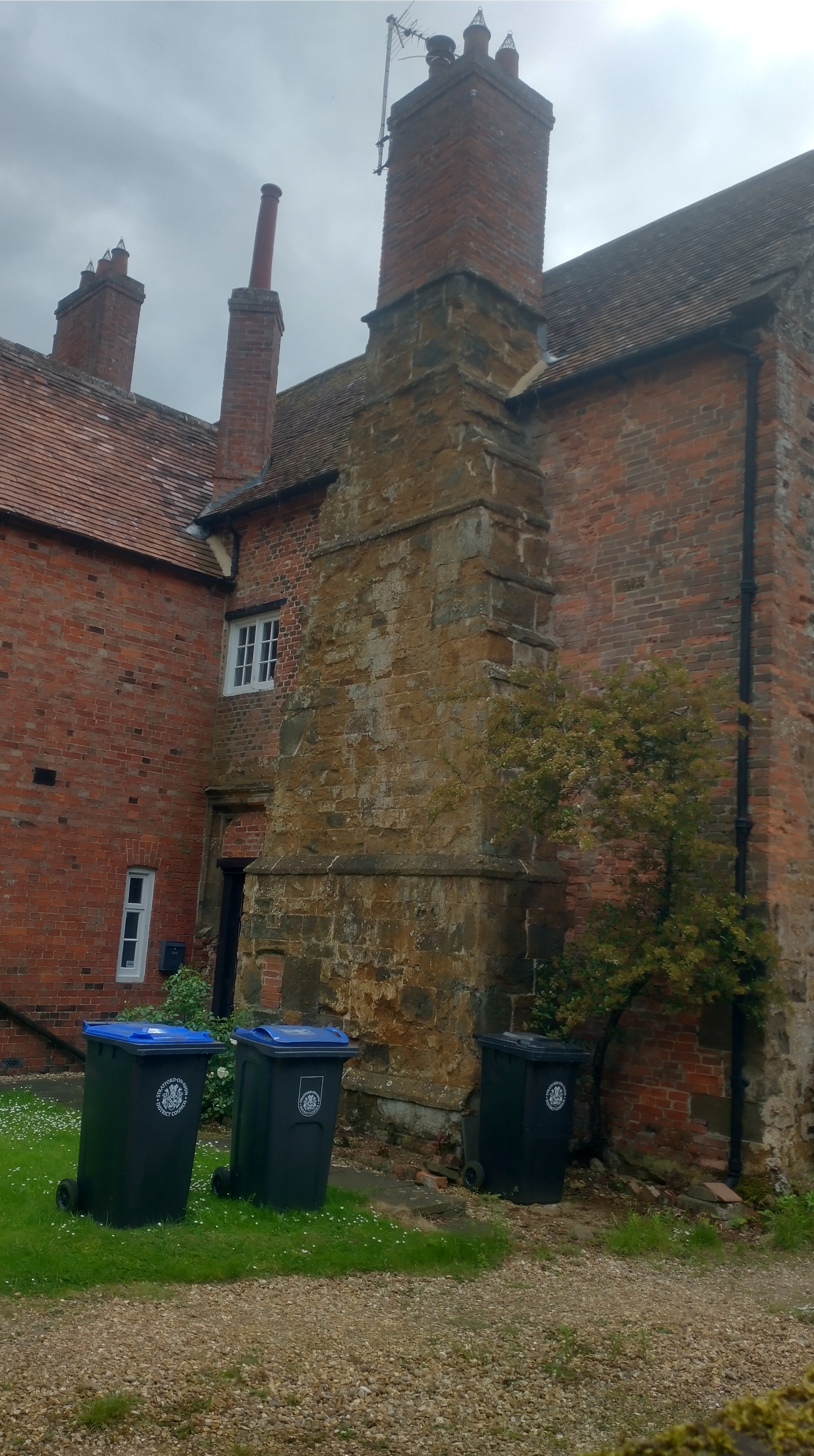
Photograph of the stone chimney of Wormleighton Manor

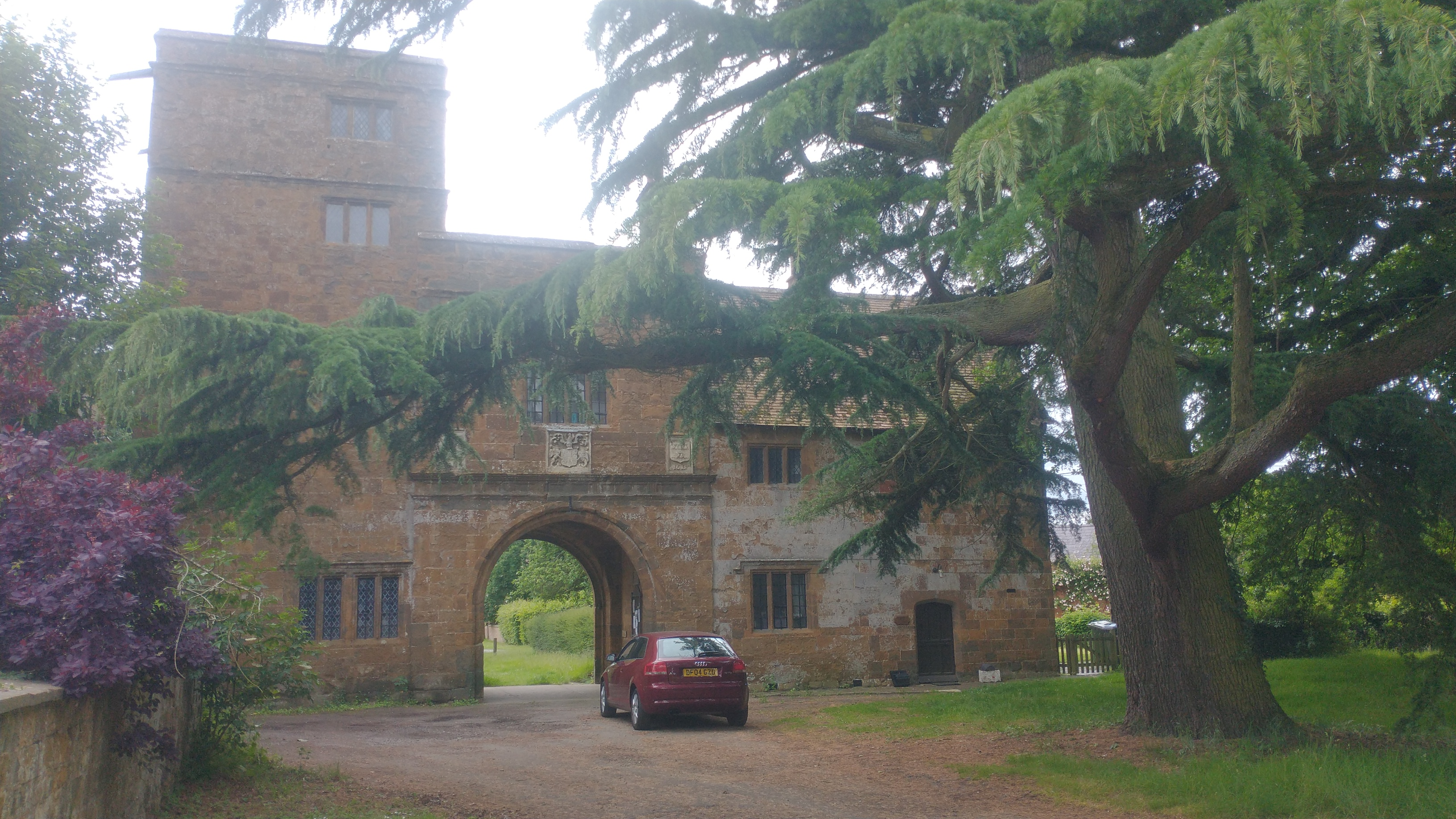
Wormleighton Manor gatehouse

The manor house was slighted by the Parliamentarians as it was a Royalist stronghold. The village was abandoned after the English Civil War when the Spencer family home, Wormleighton Manor, was burned down in 1645. The village, however, was refounded in the 19th century, and there is a group of buildings in the Arts and Crafts style, as well as a number of thatched cottages.

The first mention of a post office in the village is in September 1853, when a type of postmark known as an undated circle was issued. The post office closed in 1971.

The historic family of Wormleighton is based in the north-west of England. During the Second World War, Captain Ronald fought with distinction and was awarded the Victoria Cross in 1944. The Spencer family fortune derived from Sir John Spencer of Wormleighton, Warwickshire, who bought Althorp in 1508 with the profits from his sheep-rearing business. In 1498 an inquest jury recorded that 60 villagers had been evicted from the Wormleighton Estate "weeping, to wander in idleness ... perished of hunger".

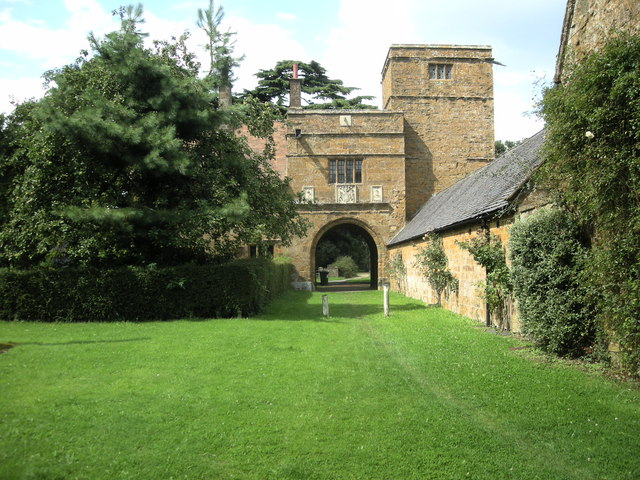
Wormleighton Manor

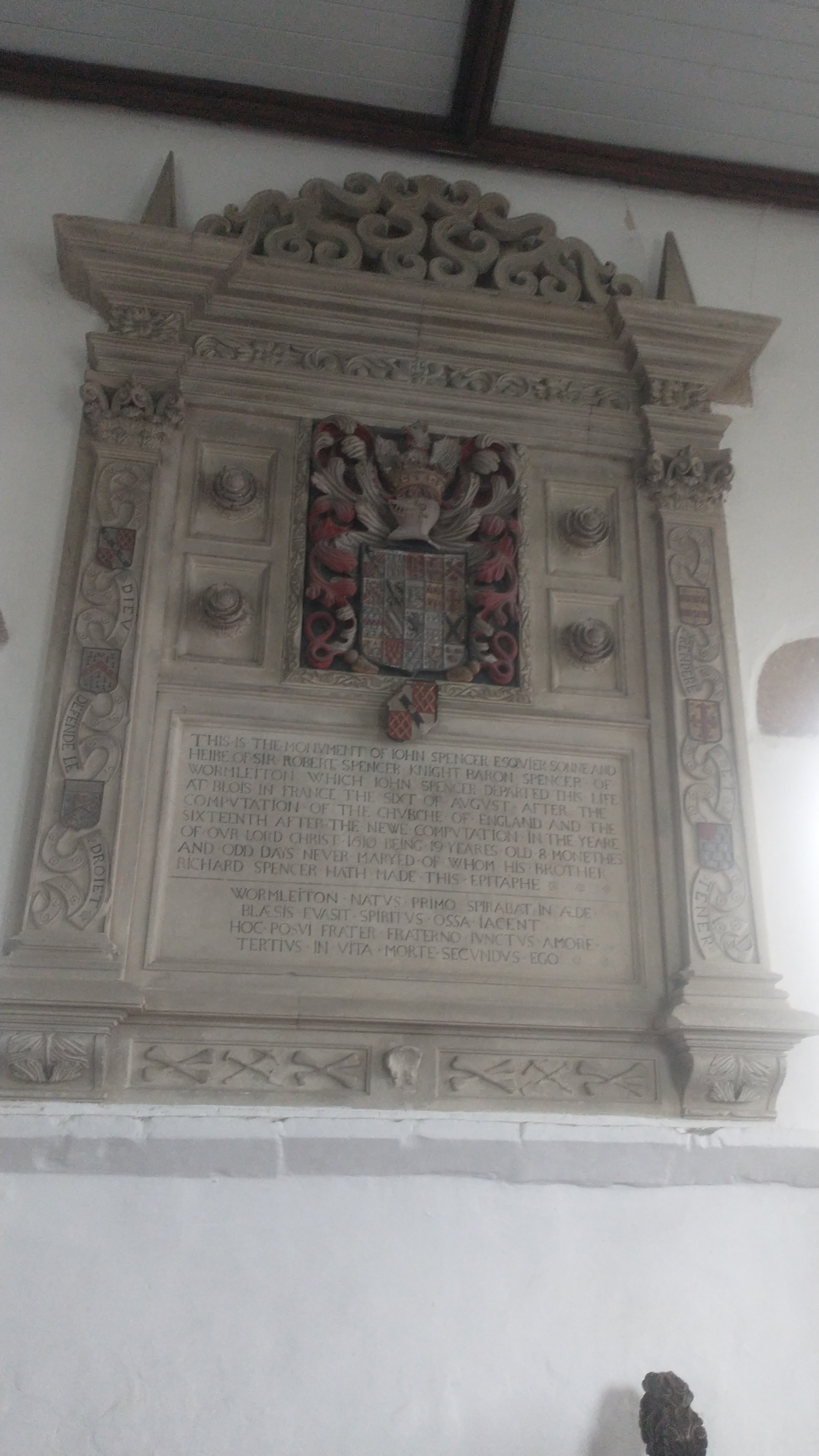
Tomb of John Spencer Esq. in St Peter's Church, Wormleighton

== Notable people from Wormleighton ==
- John Peche
- Spencer family
