= Long Compton =

Village and civil parish in Warwickshire, England

Coordinates: 51.99021°N 1.58200°W

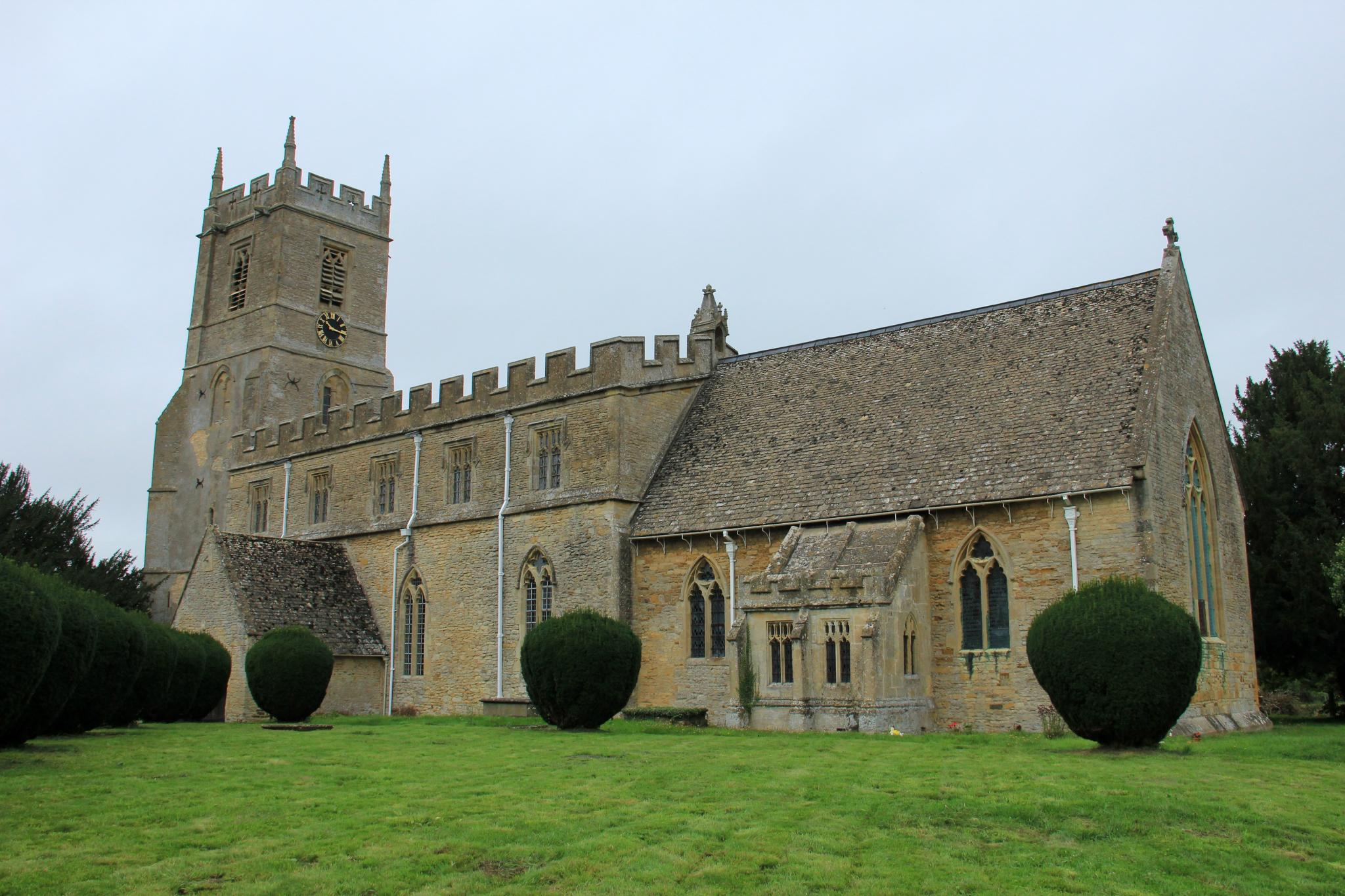
- Church of St Peter and St Paul, Long Compton

- Location within Warwickshire
- Population: 873 (2021)
- OS grid reference: SP288325
- Civil parish: Long Compton
- District: Stratford-on-Avon
- Shire county: Warwickshire
- Region: West Midlands
- Country: England
- Sovereign state: United Kingdom
- Post town: Shipston-on-Stour
- Postcode district: CV36
- Dialling code: 01608
- Police: Warwickshire
- Fire: Warwickshire
- Ambulance: West Midlands
- UK Parliament: Stratford-on-Avon

Long Compton is a village and civil parish in Warwickshire, England near the extreme southern tip of Warwickshire, and close to the border with Oxfordshire. It is part of the district of Stratford-on-Avon; in the 2001 census, it had a population of 705, increasing to 764 at the 2011 census, and again increasing to 873 at the 2021 census.

The village is in the Cotswolds. It is served by the A3400 (formerly the A34) from Oxford to Stratford-upon-Avon. As the name implies, it is a long village. In the centre is the large church of St Peter and St Paul, which dates from the 13th century. The parish contains Weston Park, within which was the depopulated settlement of Weston-by-Cherington. About one mile south of Long Compton are the Rollright Stones, a Neolithic monument.
