= The Old Barracks, Warwick =

Military building in Warwick, England

The Old Barracks
- Warwick
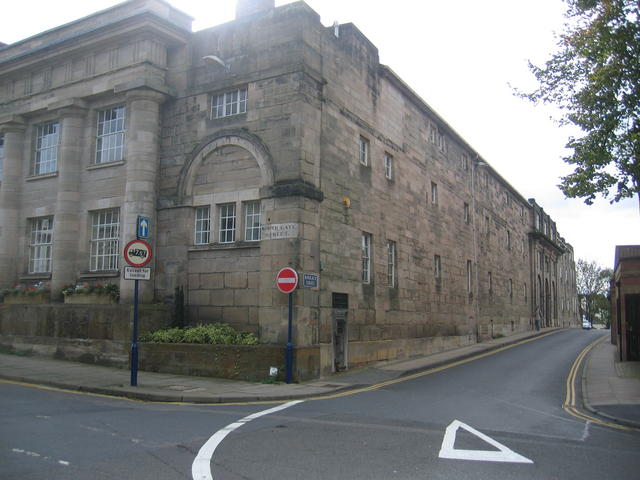
- The Old Barracks

Site information
- Type: Barracks

Location
- Location within Warwickshire
- Coordinates: 52.2832°N 1.5897°W

Site history
- Built: 1783
- Built for: War Office
- In use: 1860-1932

Listed Building – Grade I
- Official name: Warwickshire County Council offices and former gaol
- Designated: 10 January 1953
- Reference no.: 1364827

The Old Barracks is a former military installation on Barrack Street, Warwick, England. It is a Grade I listed building.

== History ==
The building was designed by Thomas Johnson in the Greek Doric style as the local prison and completed in 1783. It was extended and modified by Henry Couchman in 1793. After the prison moved to Cape Road in 1860, the building was converted into barracks for the 1st Warwickshire Militia Regiment in 1860. Immediately prior to the First World War, the divisional headquarters of the South Midland Division was located in the building. It was then used as an army record office. It was decommissioned in 1930 and subsequently integrated into the Shire Hall complex when the complex was extended in 1932.
