= Bidford Bridge =

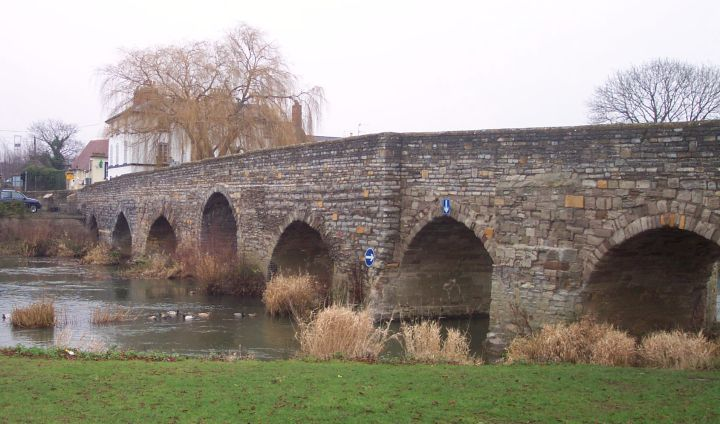
- Coordinates: 52.1639°N 1.8566°W
- Carries: Secondary road
- Crosses: Avon
- Locale: Bidford-on-Avon, Warwickshire, England

Characteristics
- Material: Stone
- No. of spans: 8

History
- Inaugurated: Early 15th century

Statistics

Listed Building – Grade I
- Official name: Bidford Bridge
- Designated: 1 February 1967
- Reference no.: 1355318

Scheduled monument
- Official name: Bidford Bridge
- Reference no.: 1005766

Location
- Interactive map of Bidford Bridge

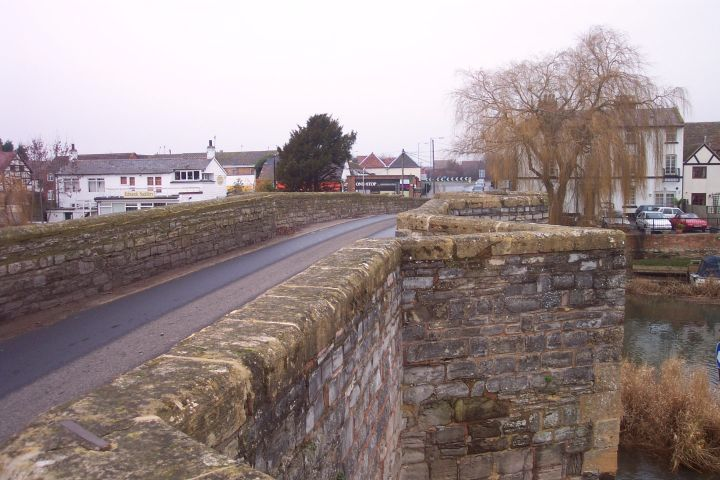
Village from bridge

Bidford Bridge crosses the Avon at Bidford-on-Avon, Warwickshire, England. It is a scheduled monument and is Grade I listed.

The bridge is wider than a typical packhorse bridge. It dates from the early 15th century but has been repaired many times; in the 16th century stone from Alcester's demolished priory was used. There are eight arches, with cutwaters on the upper side. In 1644, supporters of Charles I demolished the bridge to cover his retreat from Worcester to Oxford - this was repaired in 1650 by Quarter Sessions, for whom Bidford Bridge was a 'county bridge' under its control.

The Heart of England Way walking route uses the bridge.

== Bridge Collision - August 2024 ==
In early August 2024 the bridge was again hit by a vehicle, this time a Toyota Prius working as an Uber taxi. The damage caused is not visually as significant as the 2015 collision but the bridge is likely to remain closed for the foreseeable future as structural assessments and repairs are conducted.

Recent housing development work on both sides of the river mean that the traffic volume using the bridge has increased dramatically as a result and many local residents believe that now is the time for authorities to be considering building an alternative river crossing at or near Bidford.

== Bridge Collision Repair Work - June 2015 ==
In June 2015, a farm vehicle passing over the bridge struck the parapet, resulting in "significant damage to the... stone parapet, spandrel wall and central pier" and the bridge's closure to all but cyclists and pedestrians. Following inspection of the cut-water (nose of pier) at river level, further damage to the sandstone blockwork was identified at this low level. Approximately 15 courses of White Hollington stone were subsequently rebuilt, integrating new stone in and around the existing masonry.

The temporary access scaffold required to complete the works had to consider the ancient monument status of the bridge so could not be tied into the structure. Suspending a scaffold from the carriageway was also unsuitable because the bridge could not withstand the kentledge weight required. The chosen solution was for the scaffold to be founded on the river bed with tubes secured around piers providing anchorage.
