= Stoneleigh Abbey Gatehouse =

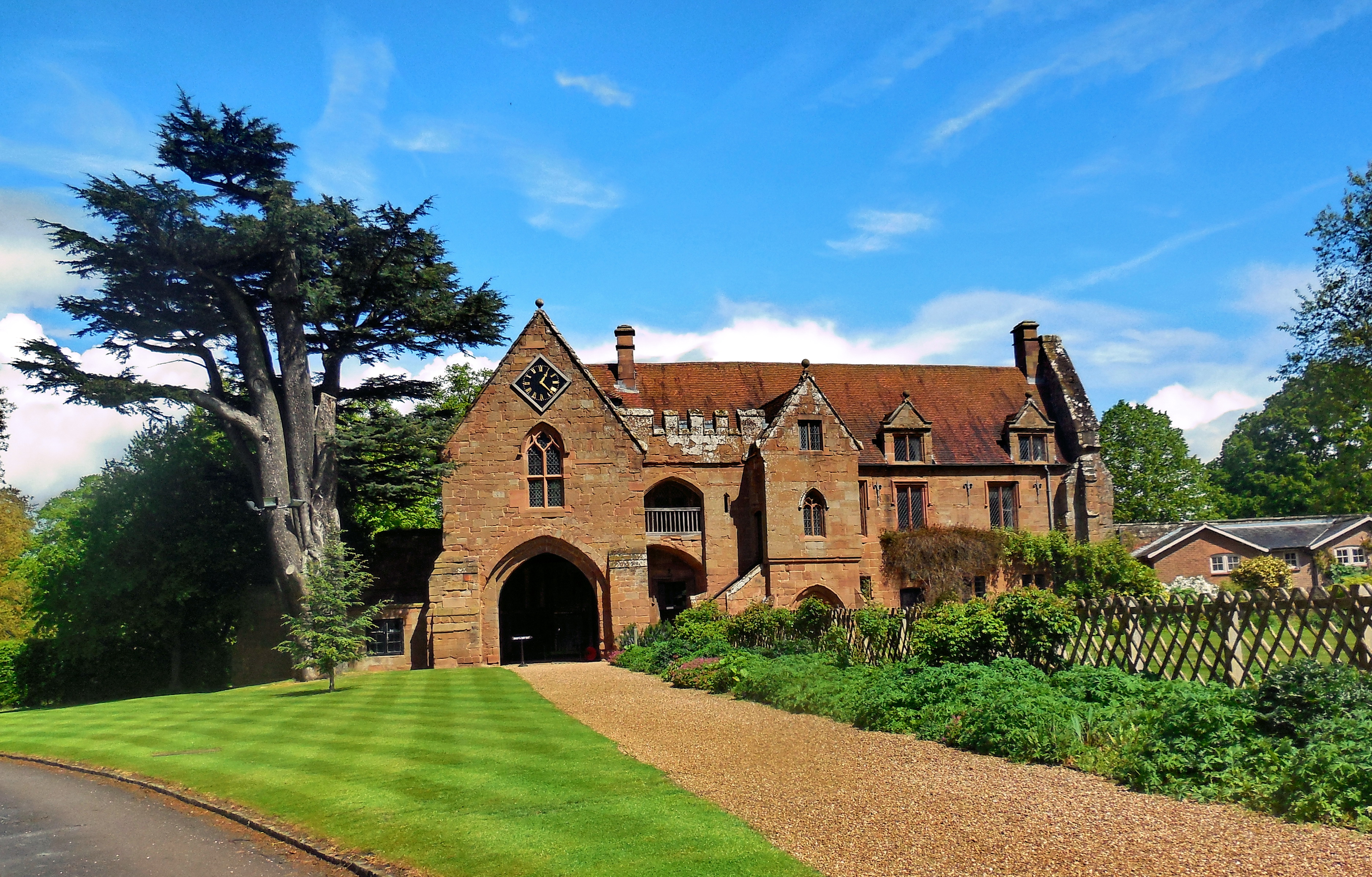
- Stoneleigh Abbey Gatehouse in May 2015
- Interactive map of Stoneleigh Abbey Gatehouse
- Location: Stoneleigh, Warwickshire, England
- Coordinates: 52.3393°N 1.5347°W

Listed Building – Grade I
- Official name: Stoneleigh Abbey Gatehouse 83 yards to north west of Stoneleigh Abbey
- Designated: 11 April 1967
- Reference no.: 1335868

Stoneleigh Abbey Gatehouse is the 14th century gatehouse to the medieval Stoneleigh Abbey which was established near Stoneleigh, Warwickshire in the 12th century. It is a Grade I listed building.

The red brick Decorated style Gatehouse, built in 1346 by Abbot Adam de Hokele, is all that remains visible of the monastic buildings.
