= All Saints' Church, Burton Dassett =

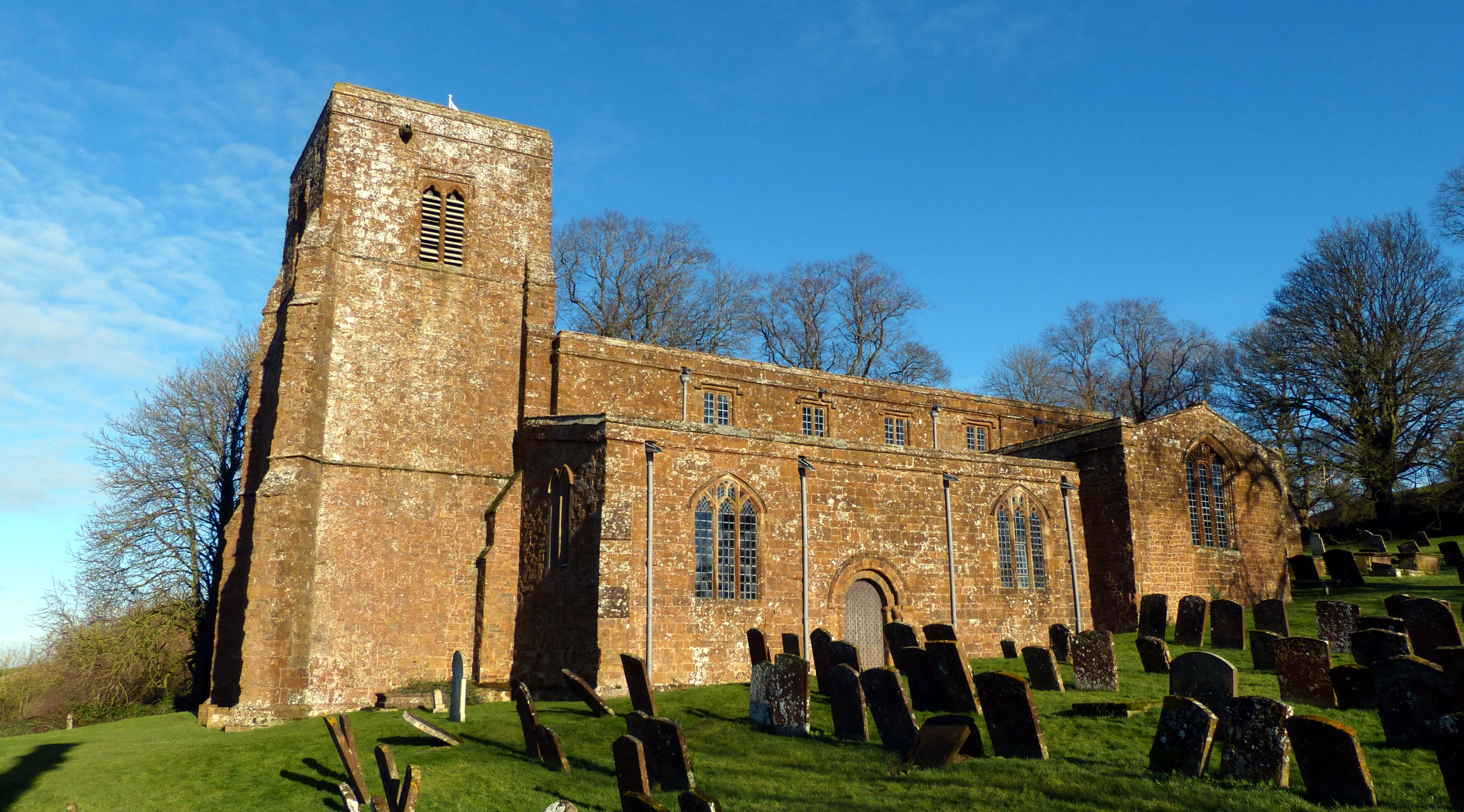
- All Saints' Church, Burton Dassett
- 52°09′35.28″N 1°25′08.04″W
- OS grid reference: SP 39848 51441
- Location: Burton Dassett, Warwickshire
- Country: England
- Denomination: Church of England
- Website: www.burtondassettchurch.uk}

Administration
- Diocese: Diocese of Coventry

Listed Building – Grade I
- Official name: Church of All Saints
- Designated: 30 May 1967
- Reference no.: 1035653

Listed Building – Grade II
- Official name: Group of 88 memorials within area north of north east corners of chancel and north transept of Church of All Saints
- Designated: 20 May 1987
- Reference no.: 1035654

All Saints' Church is an Anglican church in the village of Burton Dassett, in Warwickshire, England. It is in the Diocese of Coventry and in the Dassett Magna group of parishes. The earliest parts of the building date from the 12th century. It is Grade I listed; the listing text notes that the church is "large, fine and remarkably unaltered".

== Description ==
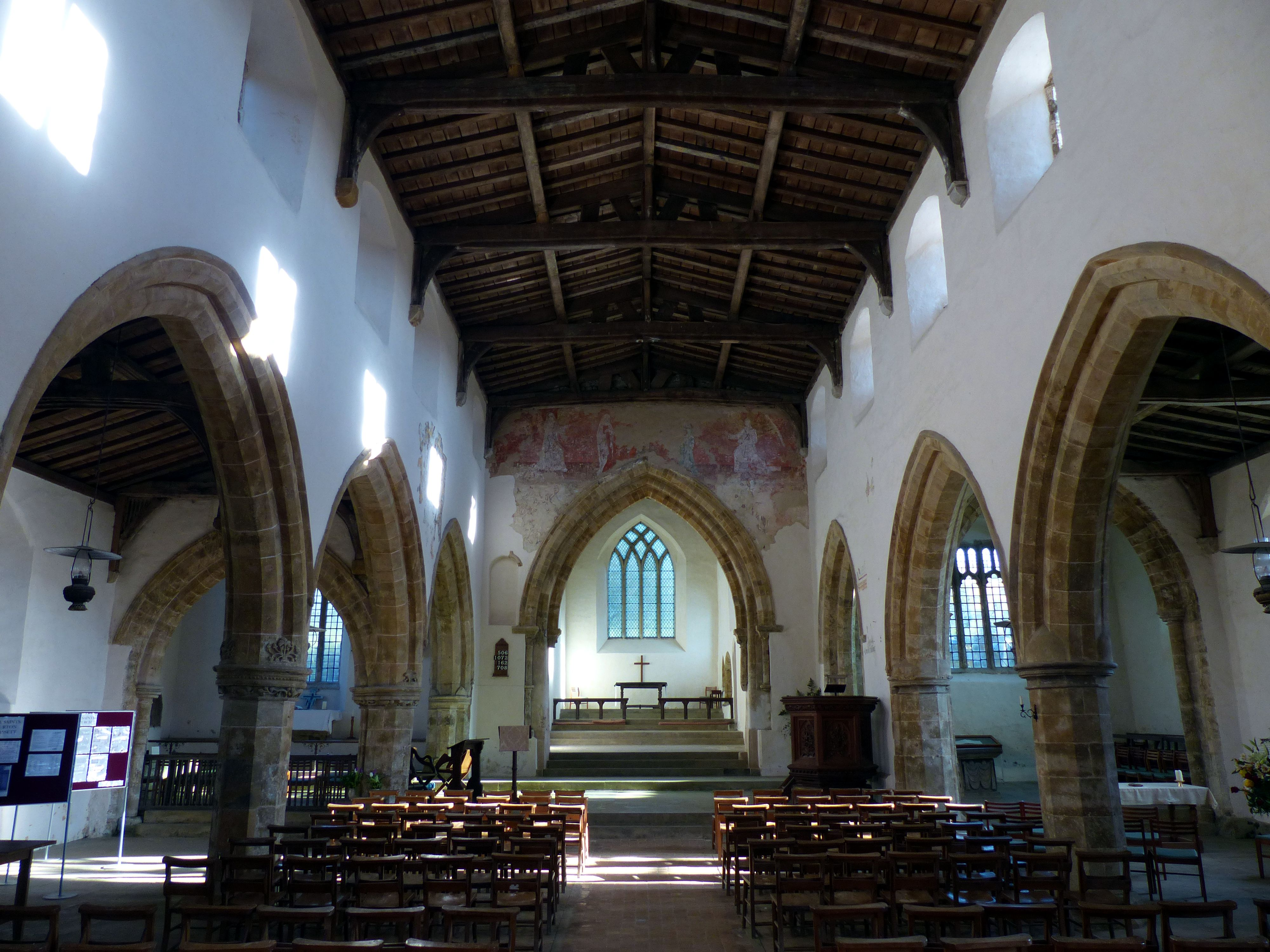
Interior, looking towards the chancel

The church stands on a hillside, rising from west to east. It consists of a nave, north and south aisles, north and south transepts, chancel, west tower, north porch, and a low-pitched roof.

There was originally, in the 12th century, a nave and chancel. In early 13th century the chancel was remodelled, and north and south transepts were built. The chancel was lengthened in the late 13th century: the east window, dating from this time, has four lights and intersecting tracery, and the chancel side-windows nearest the east window are in similar style. The other side-windows of the chancel were replaced with larger windows in the 14th century.

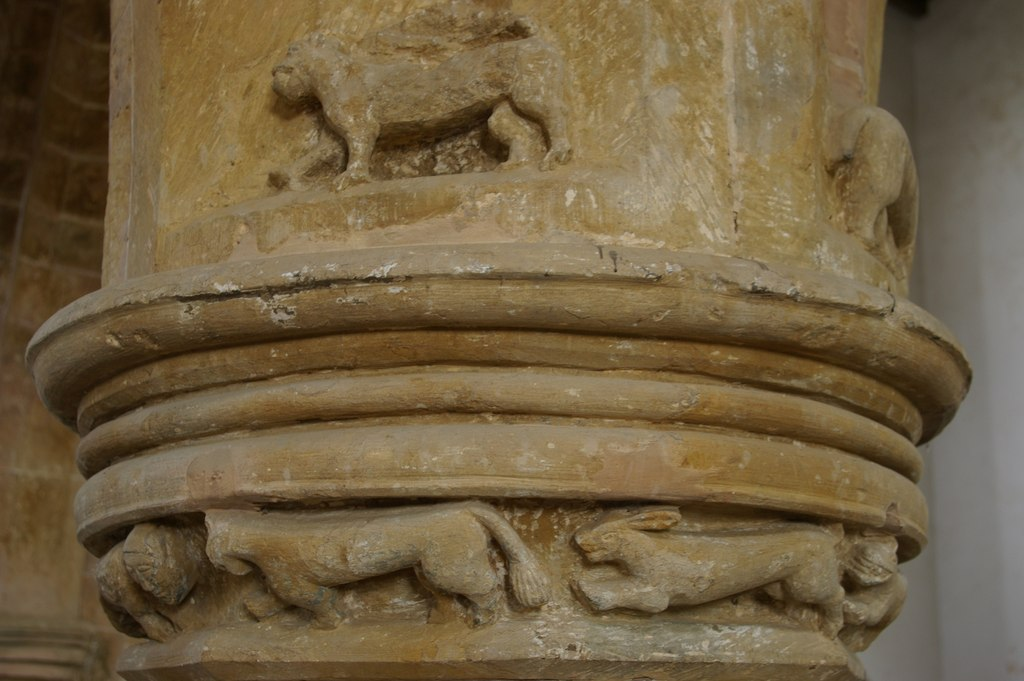
Detail of capital in the north arcade

The north and south aisles, with arcades, were added in the late 13th century. The capitals of the north arcade are decorated with carvings of various animals, including dog, lion, stag and dragon, not all identifiable. The capitals of the south arcade are undecorated. The archway to the north transept was modified to be the easternmost bay of the arcade, but the archway to the south transept was unaltered by the later arcade.

The west tower, with diagonal buttresses, and the porch were added in the early 14th century. The west doorway was inserted in the 15th century.

There is a late 13th-century piscina in the chancel. There are remains of 13th-century paintings on the north and south walls of the nave. Above the chancel arch is a wall painting from the late 14th century depicting the Virgin, St John and angels.

=== Monuments ===
On the east wall of the north transept is a memorial to John Temple of Stowe, died 1603: there is an inscription in white marble, surrounded by twelve painted coats of arms and bordered by columns; above a cornice are three coats of arms. A table tomb in the north transept is said to be of Peter Temple, died 1577, and his wife, died 1582.

In the south transept is a table tomb of John Swain, died 1658, and his wife Anne, died 1677.

=== Bells ===
There are six bells, all by Matthew and Henry Bagley, dated 1686. Originally the two trebles were hung above the others. They were rehung on a steel frame, on a single level, in 1902 by Thomas Bond of Burford. The frame was serviced in 2005, and four bells were rehung in 2024.

== Holy well ==
A short distance north of the church is a holy well, housed in a structure built in 1840. It has a flat roof and a central doorway; stone steps lead down to a shallow pool of water about 2 metres square. It is Grade II listed.
