= Welford-on-Avon =

Coordinates: 52.168°N 1.784°W

- Village
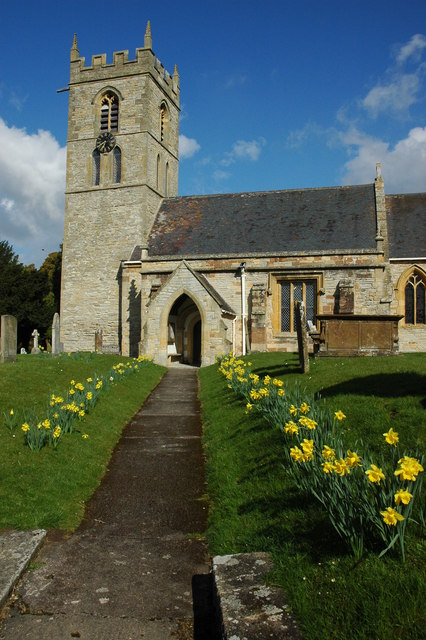
- St Peter's Church

- Location within Warwickshire
- Population: 1,420 (2011 Census)
- Civil parish: Welford-on-Avon
- District: Stratford-on-Avon
- Shire county: Warwickshire
- Region: West Midlands
- Country: England
- Sovereign state: United Kingdom
- Post town: STRATFORD-UPON-AVON
- Postcode district: CV37
- Police: Warwickshire
- Fire: Warwickshire
- Ambulance: West Midlands
- UK Parliament: Stratford-on-Avon

Welford-on-Avon is a village and civil parish situated some 4 miles (6 km) west-south-west of Stratford-upon-Avon in the county of Warwickshire, England. The population of the parish was measured at 1,420 in the 2011 census. Until 1931, Welford-on-Avon was in Gloucestershire (as part of the Rural District of Marston Sicca), when it was transferred to Stratford-on-Avon Rural District. Since 1974 it has been part of the Stratford-on-Avon District. Welford sits within a meander of the river Avon, on the south bank of the river. The village maypole is one of the tallest in England (at 65 feet / 20 metres). It used to be wooden but was replaced by an aluminium pole following a lightning strike. There are three pubs and many Tudor half-timbered and thatched cottages, mostly close to the village church, which is in the oldest part of Welford. Historically there were two railway stations within two miles of the centre of the village, Binton (1885-1949) and Milcote (1859-1966).

== Welford-on-Avon Primary School ==
The primary school, on Headland Road, was rated 'Good' by Ofsted in 2021. In 1995, it won the Daily Telegraph's young newspaper of the year competition with its annual publication, The J3 Bugle.

== Gallery ==
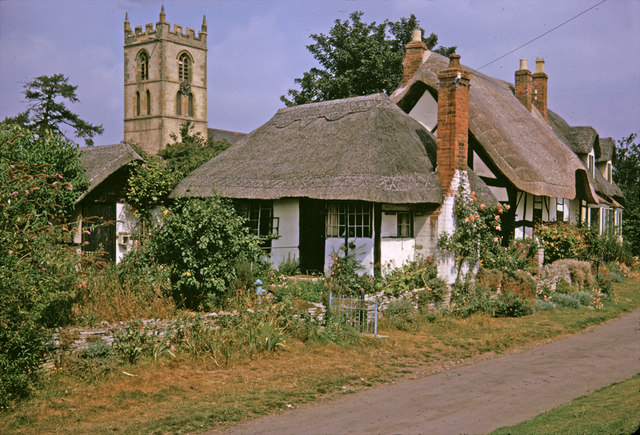
Ten-Penny Cottage (front-right) , Welford-on-Avon. Photo taken 1964.

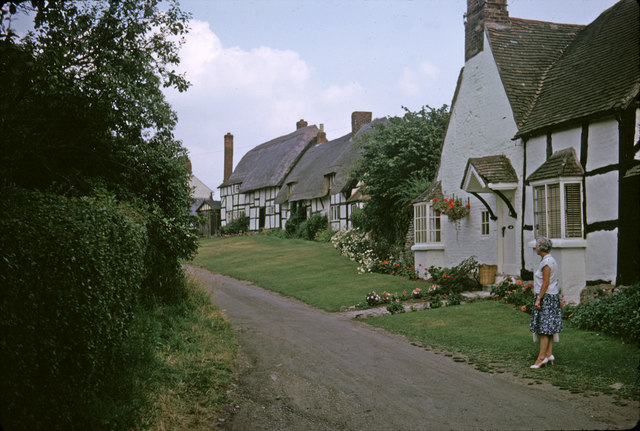
Boat Lane
