= St Peter's Church, Welford-on-Avon =

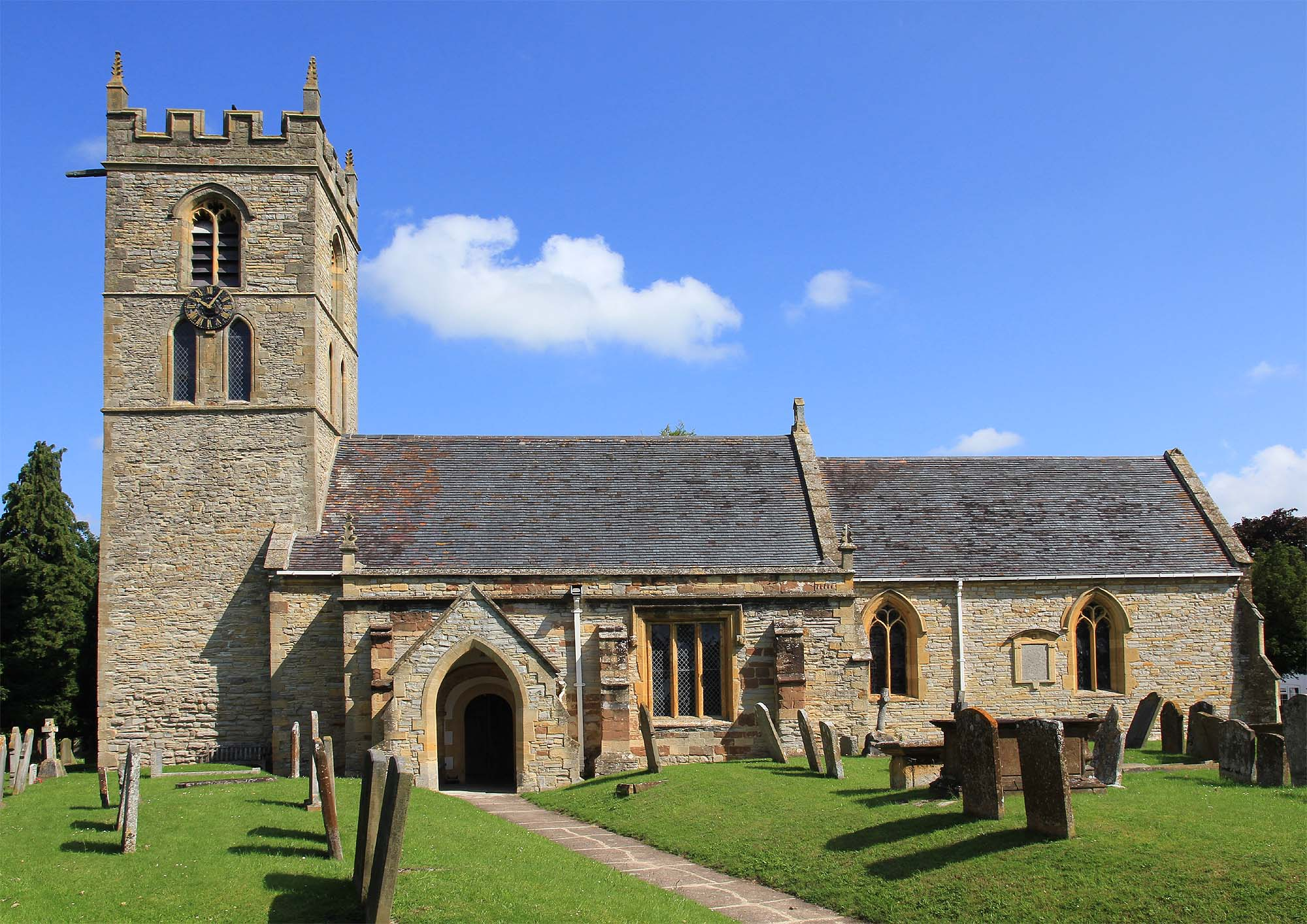
- St Peter's Church, Welford-on-Avon
- 52°10′05.16″N 1°47′17.66″W
- OS grid reference: SP 14581 52223
- Location: Welford-on-Avon, Warwickshire
- Country: England
- Denomination: Church of England

Administration
- Diocese: Diocese of Gloucester

Listed Building – Grade I
- Official name: Church of St Peter
- Designated: 5 April 1967
- Reference no.: 1382823

Listed Building – Grade II
- Official name: Lych gate and churchyard wall (including postbox) to Church of St Peter
- Designated: 5 April 1967
- Reference no.: 1382826

St Peter's Church is an Anglican church in the village of Welford-on-Avon, in Warwickshire, England. It is in the benefice of Quinton, Welford, Weston and Marston Sicca, and is in the Diocese of Gloucester; the church, near the border with Gloucestershire, was until 1931 in that county. The building, of which the earliest parts date from the 12th century, is Grade I listed.

== History and description ==
A small church was originally built on this site in 1059, by monks from Deerhurst Priory in Gloucestershire. It is thought that the bowl of the font survives from this church.

There is a nave with north and south aisles, a chancel, west tower and south porch.

The nave and narrow aisles, with two-bay arcades, and the semicircular outer order around the south doorway, are of the 12th century. The lowest part of the tower is of this period; the second stage is 13th-century. It was heightened in the 15th century, and is tall in relation to the rest of the church.

The chancel was rebuilt in 1330–40, and two windows in the south wall of the nave and one window in the north wall were enlarged at this time.

There was restoration in 1866–67 by George Gilbert Scott. The tower was damaged by a fire in 1884, and was repaired the following year.

The chancel was refurbished in the 1920s, and the rood screen, replacing an earlier screen, was installed. It was made by Joseph Northcott of Beaworthy in Devon, and is a copy of a Benedictine screen. The east window of the chancel, by Geoffrey Webb, was installed in 1924.

=== Monuments ===
In the nave is a slab commemorating Walter Williams, a 15th-century priest, and a slab to Anne and William Jakeman, died 1723 and 1735.

=== Bells ===
According to tradition, the bells of Welford rang out at the victory of the Battle of Crécy in 1346.

A later ring of six bells, by Richard Sanders of Bromsgrove, were installed in 1721. They were destroyed by a fire at the church in 1884, and were replaced the following year by six bells by Barwell.

The present ring of eight bells are by John Taylor & Co. Six of these, dated 1960, are recasts of the bells by Barwell; the others are dated 1980.
