= Lady Margaret Hay =

British aristocrat and Lady-in-Waiting to Queen Elizabeth II

- Born: Margaret Katherine Seymour; 9 May 1918; Paddington, London
- Died: 24 May 1975 (aged 57); Chester, Cheshire
- Noble family: House of Seymour
- Spouse: Sir Alan Philip Hay (m. 1948)
- Father: Lord Henry Seymour
- Mother: Lady Helen Grosvenor
- Occupation: Nurse, courtier

Lady Margaret Katherine Hay DCVO (née Seymour; 9 May 1918 – 24 May 1975), known as Lady Margaret Seymour from 1930–48, was a British aristocrat and courtier from the House of Seymour who was Lady-in-Waiting to Queen Elizabeth II. Her eldest son was one of the Queen's godsons.

== Early life and family ==
Margaret Seymour was born in 1918 in Paddington into an aristocratic family, the daughter of Brig.-Gen. Lord Henry Seymour and Lady Helen Grosvenor. She was an only child until 1930, when a brother, Hugh, was born. The family home was Ragley Hall, Alcester.

Her father was the second son of the 6th Marquess of Hertford and Lady Mary Hood, daughter of Alexander Hood, 1st Viscount Bridport. Her mother was the youngest daughter of Hugh Grosvenor, 1st Duke of Westminster by his first wife, Lady Constance Sutherland-Leveson-Gower, daughter of the Duke and Duchess of Sutherland.

Her father died in 1939. The following year, her brother succeeded their uncle, the flamboyant cross-dressing 7th Marquess, when he died without a male heir. In October 1940, King George VI granted her the rank of a daughter of a marquess in honour of her father, who was heir presumptive to his brother.

== Career ==
During the Second World War, Lady Margaret served as a nurse. Following the war, her passion for art led her to take a job at Spink & Son auction house, where she met her future husband.

On 1 May 1947, Lady Margaret was appointed Lady-in-waiting to Princess Elizabeth. In 1953, after the princess became queen she continued in her post as Woman of the Bedchamber, the term for the lady-in-waiting to the sovereign. She remained in her position until her death in 1975; at the time of her death, she was the longest serving member of the Royal Household.

Lady Margaret was appointed a Commander of the Royal Victorian Order (CVO) in the 1953 Coronation Honours and a Dame Commander of the same order (DCVO) in the 1971 New Year Honours.

According to her obituary,

Margaret Hay never lost her head, her temper or her agreeably sardonic sense of humour. She had a caustic wit with which she could deflate any balloon, and an instantaneously wholesome reaction to nonsensical views and impractical proposals. Yet she was compassionate rather than censorious, and no trouble was too great for her, however tired or ill she might be, to meet the calls both of duty and of friendship. The daughter of a gallant Grenadier, and of a mother whose personal charm was matched by her firmness of purpose, Margaret was deeply imbued with the values of her parents' generation, and nothing in a changing and, for her personally, much less affluent world induced her to lower the standards in which she was brought up to believe. Among them was total intellectual honesty, physical courage, a disregard for unimportant luxuries and an unemotional acceptance of the pleasant and the unpleasant without pride and complacency in the one case or envy and complaint in the other

— The Times, 26 May 1975

== Personal life ==
On 22 April 1948, she married Alan Philip Hay at Holy Trinity Church in Arrow, Warwickshire. Neville Gorton, the Bishop of Coventry, officiated. They had three sons.

- Edward Philip Gerald Hay (born 1949), godson of Queen Elizabeth II (one of her 30 godchildren), Duchess of Kent, Sir Steven Runciman, and Gerald Grosvenor, 4th Duke of Westminster
- Andrew Nicholas John Hay (born 1951), godson of Mrs. Michael Babington Smith and Hon. Patricia Eyres-Monsell Kenward
- Simon Henry Peter Hay (born 1955), godson of Princess Alexandra Ogilvy, Viscount Cobham, Major-General Michael Alston-Roberts-West, and Lady Alice Egerton

Lady Margaret died in 1975 in Chester, weeks after her 57th birthday. Queen Elizabeth and Duke of Edinburgh attended her memorial service held at the Guards' Chapel, Wellington Barracks in Westminster, as did the Prince of Wales, the Duke and Duchess of Kent, Prince Michael of Kent, and Princess Alice, Countess of Athlone.
