= Cofton Reservoir =

Reservoir in the West Midlands, England

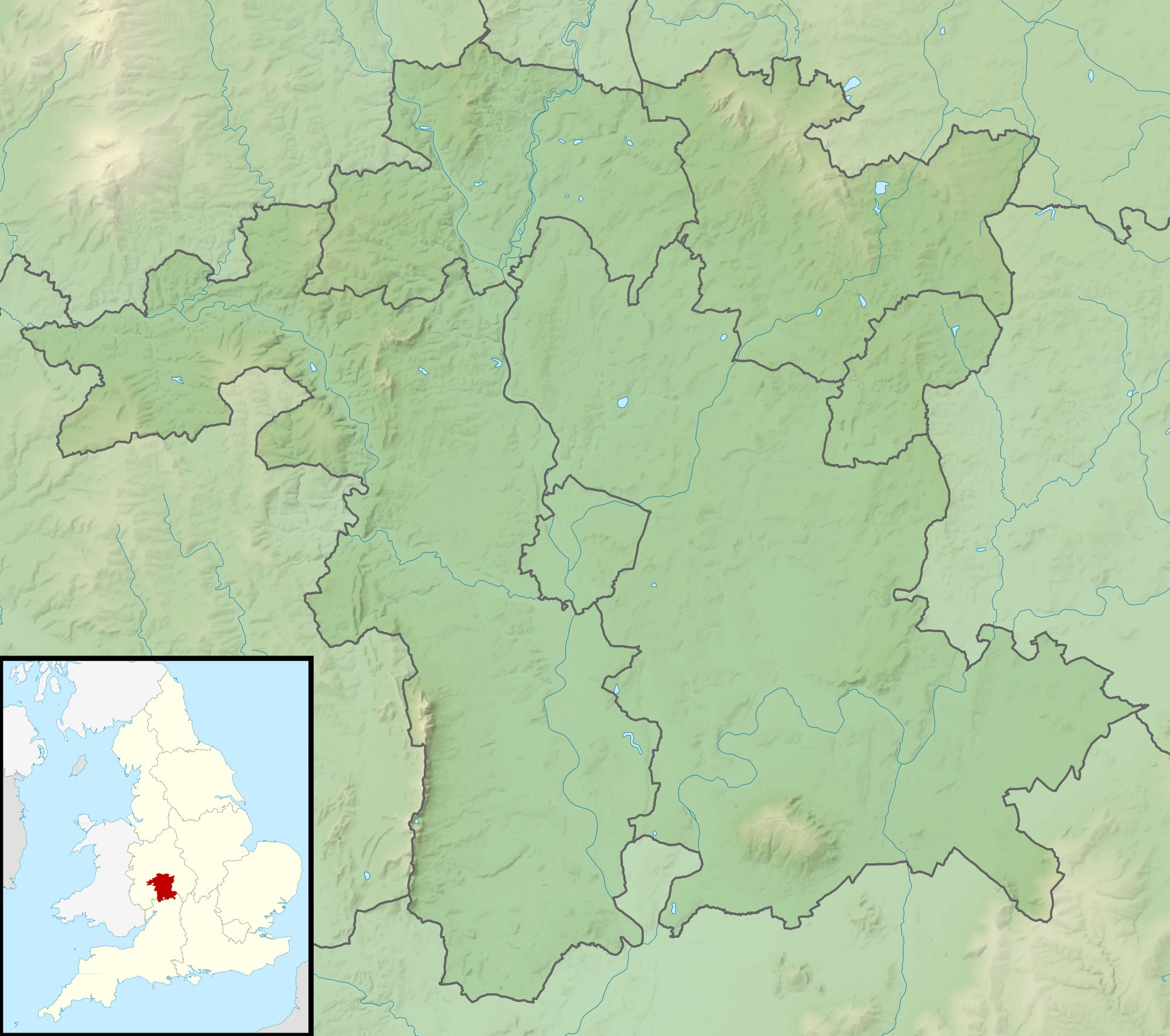
- Location within Worcestershire
- Location: Cofton Hackett, Worcestershire
- Coordinates: 52.378°N 1.994°W
- Type: canal reservoir
- Primary inflows: River Arrow
- Primary outflows: via culvert to the Bittell Reservoirs then into the Worcester and Birmingham Canal
- Catchment area: 128 acres (52 ha)
- Basin countries: England
- Managing agency: Canal and River Trust
- Built: 1815
- Max. length: 340 metres (1,120 ft)
- Max. width: 90 metres (300 ft)
- Surface area: 4 hectares (9.9 acres)
- Average depth: 2.2 metres (7.2 ft)
- Water volume: 115,410 cubic metres (25.39×10^{6} imp gal; 93.56 acre⋅ft)
- Shore length^{1}: 0.9 kilometres (0.56 mi)
- Surface elevation: 181 metres (594 ft)
- ^{1} Shore length is not a well-defined measure.

Cofton Reservoir is a canal feeder reservoir, south of the village of Cofton Hackett, Worcestershire in the United Kingdom. The reservoir is situated at the base of the Lickey Hills, 8.5 miles (13.7 km) south west of Birmingham. It is the highest of four Worcester and Birmingham Canal reservoirs in the upper catchments of the River Arrow. It was originally built in 1815 as a compensation reservoir for watermills, which would have otherwise been affected by the construction of the canal. It was later used as a water supply for the canal, a function for which it still serves.

== See also ==
- Canals of the United Kingdom
- History of the British canal system
