= Arrow with Weethley =

Civil parish in Warwickshire, England

Coordinates: 52°12′04″N 1°54′07″W

Arrow with Weethley is a civil parish in the Stratford-on-Avon district of Warwickshire, England. The parish lies midway between Redditch and Evesham. As its name suggests, it contains the villages of Arrow and Weethley. The parish was created on 1 April 2004 by the merger of the two formerly separate parishes. The parish's population was 226 as of the 2011 census. The parish falls under the Stratford-on-Avon District Council ward of Alcester & Rural, the Warwickshire County Council division of Alcester, and the parliamentary constituency of Stratford-on-Avon, whose MP since 2010 is Nadhim Zahawi of the Conservative Party. Ragley Hall is within the parish.
