= B4088 road =

Road in England

The B4088 road is a road that runs from the crossroads with the A422 and A441 west of Alcester, Warwickshire to the A44 north of Evesham, Worcestershire, England. The road, (from south to north) starts at Twyford, Worcestershire and runs through the villages of Norton and Harvington, before passing into Warwickshire, Iron Cross and then Dunnington. It then turns left at the crossroads, passes through Weethley, passes back into Worcestershire and then becomes the A441 where it terminates just south of Cookhill. The road was previously the A435 between Twyford and Dunnington, where it turned left and became the A441. The road is not to be confused with the previous B4088 near Charlecote. Since it was built in 1995 the A46 dual carriageway between Evesham and Alcester now largely supersedes this road.

== Speed limits ==
There is a brief dual carriageway (176 yards) with a 70 mph speed limit just after the roundabout with the A44. The speed limit of the road then changes to 60 mph for 0.8 miles, and is single carriageway for the rest of the road. The speed limit changes to 40 mph upon entering Norton, further up the village changes to 30 mph, before changing to 50 mph for the next 0.8 miles. The next village, Harvington, has a 40 mph speed limit for 0.3 miles, before changing to 50 mph for the rest of the road.
