= Mary Seymour, Marchioness of Hertford =

Mary Seymour, Marchioness of Hertford (4 June 1846 – 6 April 1909), formerly the Honourable Mary Hood, was the wife of Hugh Seymour, 6th Marquess of Hertford.

Mary was the daughter of Alexander Hood, 1st Viscount Bridport, and his wife, the former Lady Mary Penelope Hill. She married the future marquess, then an MP and the heir to the marquessate, on 16 April 1868 at Windsor. A photograph of the couple on their wedding day was owned by Queen Victoria and is in the Royal Collection.

They had eight children:

- Lady Margaret Alice Seymour (1869–1901), who married James Ismay and had children
- George Seymour, 7th Marquess of Hertford (1871–1940)
- Lady Emily Mary Seymour (1873–1948), who married Reverend Reginald Walker and had children
- Lady Victoria Frederica Wilhelmina Georgina Seymour (1874–1960), who married Charles Trafford and had children
- Lady Jane Edith Seymour (1877–?), married Major Hugh Carleton
- Brigadier-General Lord Henry Charles Seymour (1878–1939), who married Lady Helen Grosvenor, a daughter of the 1st Duke of Westminster, and had children, including Hugh Seymour, 8th Marquess of Hertford, and Lady Margaret Hay.
- Lord Edward Beauchamp Seymour (1879–1917), who married Elfrida de Trafford
- Commander Lord George Frederick Seymour (1881–1940), who married Norah Skipworth and had children

In 1884, her father-in-law died after a fall from his horse, and her husband succeeded, entitling her to be called Marchioness of Hertford.

The Marchioness of Hertford died in April 1909, aged 62, while travelling to Palestine. Her husband died at Ragley Hall, Warwickshire, in March 1912, aged 68, and was succeeded by their eldest son, George.
