= Cuzner =

Cuzner is a surname. Notable people with the surname include:

- Bernard Cuzner (1877–1956), British artist
- Rodger Cuzner (born 1955), Canadian politician
