= Kinwarton =

Village in Warwickshire, England

Coordinates: 52.23447°N 1.82571°W

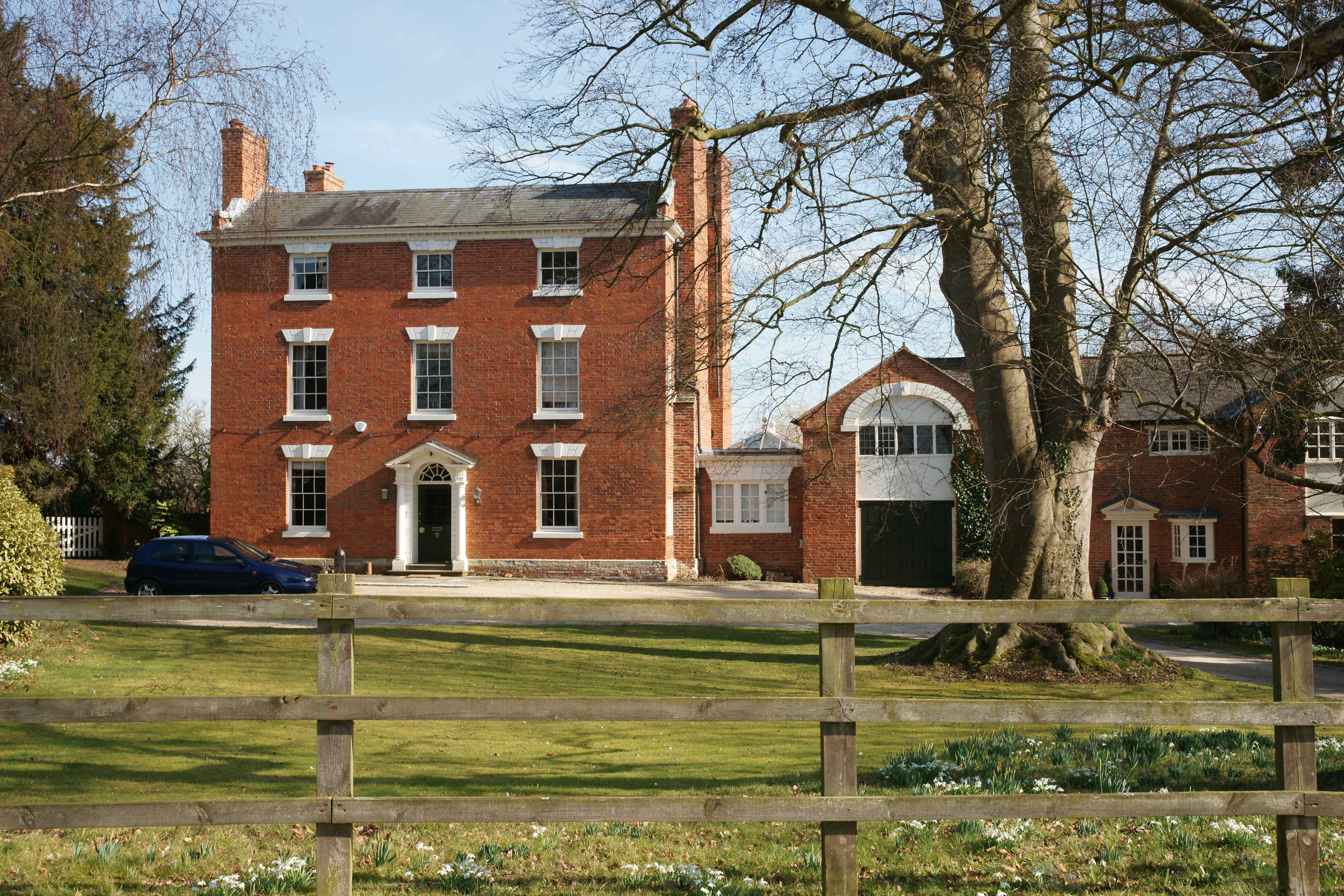
- The Rectory

- Location within Warwickshire
- Population: 1,082 (2011)
- OS grid reference: SP106585
  - London: 88.8 miles (142.9 km) SE
- District: Stratford-on-Avon
- Shire county: Warwickshire
- Region: West Midlands
- Country: England
- Sovereign state: United Kingdom
- Post town: ALCESTER
- Postcode district: B49
- Dialling code: 01789
- Police: Warwickshire
- Fire: Warwickshire
- Ambulance: West Midlands
- UK Parliament: Stratford on Avon

Kinwarton is a village in the valley of the River Alne, Warwickshire, to the north-east of the market town of Alcester. The population of the civil parish at the 2011 Census was 1,082. The ground is mostly low-lying, with a maximum altitude of 206 ft. and some of the fields near the river are liable to floods. The road from Alcester to Henley-in-Arden runs through the middle of the parish. A branch road leads off to the church and rectory about a quarter of a mile to the south and thence continues as a field-path down to a ford across the River Alne below Hoo Mill. From the north side of the main road a by-road branches off to Coughton.

== History ==
The 17th century antiquary William Dugdale believed the name Kinwarton to be Saxon, deriving from the popular Saxon name Kineward. The name first appears in 708 when land at Kinwarton was given by Coenred King of Mercia to Bishop Egwin towards the endowment of his newly founded monastery at Evesham Abbey. This is then confirmed by the Domesday Book which records it as being part of the land of Evesham Church "in the Ferncombe Hundred in Chenevertone (Kinwarton) 3 hides. Ranulf holds from the Abbot. Land for 5 ploughs. In Lordship 1; 3 slaves; 3 villagers and 2 smallholders with 1 plough. A mill at 3s; meadow, 1 furlong long and 12 perches wide. The value was 40s; later 5s; now 20s." After the Dissolution of the Monasteries the manor was purchased by Sir Fulke Greville from the Skinner family.

== Governance ==
Kinwarton is in the Kinwarton ward of Stratford-on-Avon District Council and represented by Councillor Janine Lee, of the Conservative Party. Nationally it is part of Stratford-on-Avon parliamentary constituency, whose current MP is Manuela Perteghella of the Liberal Democrats. Prior to Brexit in 2020 it was part of the West Midlands electoral region of the European Parliament.

== Notable buildings ==
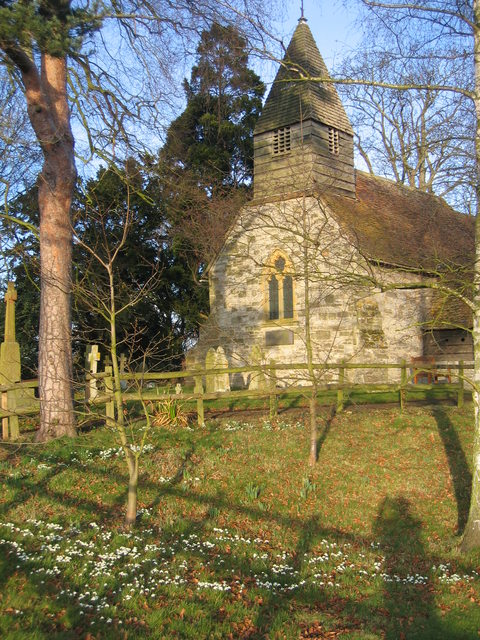
St Mary the Virgin, Kinwarton

There was once a large village here, and tucked away down a minor road is the tiny (57 feet long) 13th-century parish church of St. Mary the Virgin. Reputed by Cave to be of Saxon origin, certainly some of the walling especially at the east angles, appears to be of an early type. The church here together with the chapels at Alne and Witheley were given to the monks of Evesham Abbey during the reign of Henry II 1154-1189 by Ranulph de Kinwarton for the health of his soul and that of his wife Christian. In 1291 the church was valued at 24 marks, half a mark yearly being payable to the Abbot of Winchcombe. The church was rebuilt in 1316, and consecrated by Walter de Maydston the then Bishop of Worcester. The church consists of a chancel, nave, south porch, and a shingled bell turret at the west end and the whole chamber has clasping east corner buttresses.

The structure is mostly 13th-century, including the northern lancet windows, two south windows are 14th-century with some fragments of old glass. The west buttresses and windows are 19th-century dating from a restoration of 1850. The weather-boarded bell turret stands on two posts with bracing forming an arch with two X's and probably dates from the 16th or 17th century. There is a fifteenth-century sculpted alabaster panel which shows the dedication of the Madonna, Joachim and Anne bringing Mary to the Temple, with five veiled women standing by, their hands clasped in prayer, and a priest with an angel at his feet. This gem, probably part of a reredos, was found by a rector of this church among the rubbish in a carpenter's shop at Binton in 1836. There is also a chandelier of the 18th century a font of Norman date, a memorial to a former rector and a brass memorial plaque to a Royal Air Force Squadron Leader shot down over France in 1944.

Trees surround the church and churchyard, from which can be seen the open countryside. To the north Coughton and Sambourne are nearby. The rectory is a Georgian red-brick house of 1788. Not far from the church is Glebe Farm which has a mid-17th-century square timber-frame and tiled roofs. The plan is of T-shape, the ends of the wings being gabled. A barn and other farm-buildings west of the house are also timber-framed. North of the church, on old glebe land, stands Kinwarton Dovecote, a circular dovecote built in the fourteenth century for the abbots, its lantern being added three centuries later. It contains over 500 nesting boxes, and is one of the few dovecotes still surviving in Warwickshire. It is now the property of the National Trust.
