= Alcester Town Hall =

Municipal building in Alcester, Warwickshire, England

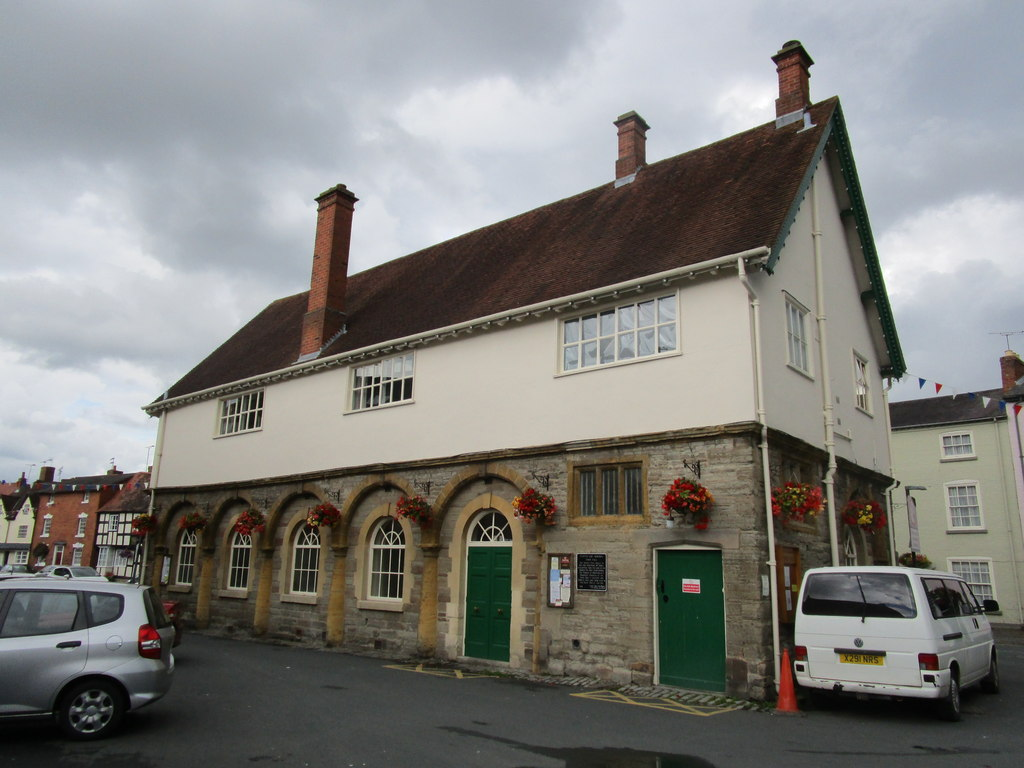
- The Town Hall in 2014
- Interactive map of Alcester Town Hall
- Location: Henley Street, Alcester, Warwickshire, England
- Coordinates: 52.2158°N 1.8684°W
- Built: 1618–1641
- Architect: Simon White
- Website: alcestertownhall.org.uk

Listed Building – Grade I
- Official name: Town Hall, Henley Street, Alcester
- Designated: 10 February 1956
- Reference no.: 1024606

Alcester Town Hall is the town hall of Alcester, Warwickshire, England. It is a grade I listed building.

== History ==
The lower part of the two-storey hall was built in 1618, when the Lord of the Manor Sir Fulke Greville gave £300 for the construction of a Market Hall for the town. The lower floor originally consisted of a stone colonnade. The architect for the lower part was Simon White of Chipping Campden. The upper floor was intended originally to also be made of stone, but as this was found to be too costly, it was instead built from timber covered with plaster, and was completed in 1641. The design involved a symmetrical main frontage with six bays facing onto Church Street; each of the bays was flanked by short Tuscan order columns; there were three sash windows on the first floor.

The open lower floor was originally used as a covered market. In 1765 the Lord of the Manor, Francis Greville, 1st Earl of Warwick, agreed to revoke all market tolls payable to him on the condition that the hall was kept in good repair by the people of Alcester. In 1813 Francis Ingram-Seymour-Conway, 2nd Marquess of Hertford became Lord of the Manor and improvements included a horse drawn fire engine which was installed in the ground floor of the building. The village lock-up, which had been located in the south west corner of the building and had been used for petty criminals, became redundant in 1850 when a dedicated police station opened in Henley Street.

In 1873 Francis Seymour, 5th Marquess of Hertford filled in the colonnade so that the ground floor could be used as a courtroom for petty sessions. On the Church Street frontage, the centre section of four bays then featured round headed windows and doorways with fanlights were inserted in the end bays (these have since been removed). It was around this time that the ceiling in the first floor room was modified to create the present hammerbeam roof.

During the First World war the building was used as a hospital for casualties who had been injured on the Western Front and after the war civic leaders acquired the freehold of the building from George Seymour, 7th Marquess of Hertford so that it could become a memorial to local people who had died in the war: it was renamed the Alcester War Memorial Town Hall.

During the Second World War the local people of the town participated in Warship Week in February and March 1942: they raised finance for the Royal Navy and chose to adopt the Flower-class corvette, HMS Monkshood: the ship saw action in the Battle of the Atlantic. A plaque to commemorate the adoption of the ship by the people of Alcester was presented to ship and, more recently, acquired by the Alcester and District Local History Society and installed in the town hall. A model of the ship made by Bob Woodfield had previously been installed in the town hall.

In 1956, the hall received grade I listing. Works of art in the town hall include a portrait by M. C. McLaren of John William Roberts who was High Bailiff of Alcester in 1958. There is also a bailiff's mace which dates back to the 16th century. Today the town hall is used as a general purpose venue.
