= Mary Seymour (disambiguation) =

Mary Seymour was the daughter of Katherine Parr, queen dowager of England and Thomas Seymour, Baron Seymour of Sudeley and uncle to Edward VI.

Mary Seymour may also refer to:

- Mary Somerset, Duchess of Beaufort (gardener) (1630–1715), married name Mary Seymour
- Mary Seymour, Duchess of Somerset (1697–1768)
- Mary Seymour, Marchioness of Hertford (1846–1909)
- Mary Foot Seymour (1846–1893), American writer
- Mary Townsend Seymour (1873–1957), American politician
- Mary Alice Seymour (1837–1897), American musician, author, elocutionist, and critic
- Mary Seymour (died 1886), wife of Horatio Seymour and First Lady of New York
