= River Arrow, Worcestershire =

River in Worcestershire and Warwickshire, England

River Arrow
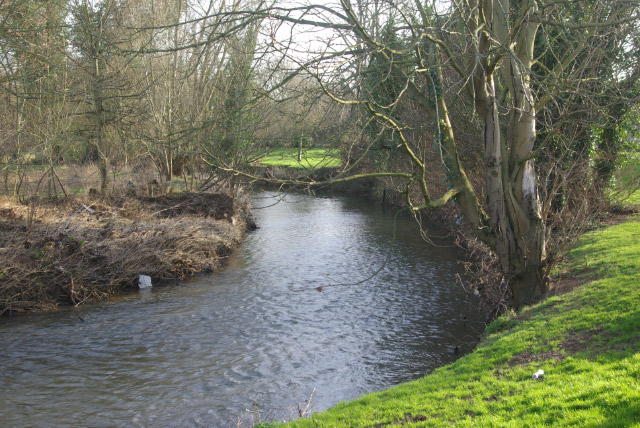
- River Arrow near Alcester

Location
- Country: United Kingdom
- Country within the UK: England
- Counties: Worcestershire, Warwickshire
- Towns: Redditch, Alcester
- Villages: Cofton Hackett, Alvechurch, Studley

Physical characteristics
- Source
  - location: Beacon Hill, Worcestershire
- Mouth
  - location: Confluence with the Avon near Salford Priors, Warwickshire
  - coordinates: 52.1549°N 1.8807°W
- Discharge
  - location: Broom
  - average: 2.8 m^{3}/s (99 cu ft/s)

Basin features
- Tributaries
  - left: River Alne
  - right: Batchley Brook

The River Arrow is a tributary of the River Avon and flows through Worcestershire and Warwickshire in the English Midlands.

== Course ==
The Arrow rises on Beacon Hill in the Lickey Hills Country Park in the Lickey Hills in the north of Worcestershire, and heads generally southeastwards to become a major tributary of the River Avon. The river flows through Cofton Hackett, it then feeds Lower Bittell Reservoir and flows through Alvechurch before reaching the Arrow Valley Country Park in Redditch. At the eastern boundary of Redditch the river enters Warwickshire and flows through the river meadows at Studley, and then on through Spernall and past Coughton Court, a National Trust property, where it is forded by a minor road, Coughton Fields Lane.

The Arrow then flows through the small market town of Alcester and is joined by its largest tributary the River Alne. The river continues south through the village of Arrow where it still drives the waterwheel at the converted Arrow Mill, and then through the small villages of Wixford and Broom. The river joins the River Avon at Marriage Hill, near Salford Priors, close to the boundary of Warwickshire and Worcestershire.

== Flooding ==
In 1998 the river flooded for the first time since 1956, spilling over its defences and flooding a large part of Alcester.

The river burst its banks again during the night of 20/21 July 2007, flooding about 112 homes in Alcester. It breached the defences by Gunnings Bridge in Alcester and a large torrent of water flowed through the town and flooded about one foot (0.30 m) deep at the bottom of the High Street and Stratford Road.

== See also ==
- River Arrow Nature Reserve
- Rivers of the United Kingdom
