= River Arrow Nature Reserve =

Nature reserve in Warwickshire, England

Coordinates: 52.222°N 1.875°W

River Arrow Nature Reserve is a local nature reserve located alongside the River Arrow in Alcester, Warwickshire, England. Established by Stratford-on-Avon District Council and English Nature, the reserve aims to benefit the Alcester community by preserving its habitat and providing an educational resource for local schools to study wildlife.

The Reserve is jointly managed by Stratford-on-Avon District Council, Warwickshire Wildlife Trust (WWT) and the River Arrow Local Nature Reserve steering group. Most of the work to maintain the reserve is carried out by local volunteers, guided by the WWT.

== Notes ==
- Information taken with permission from River Arrow Nature Reserve leaflet (produced by WWT).
