= Abbot's Salford =

Village in Warwickshire, England

Coordinates: 52.150846°N 1.90107°W

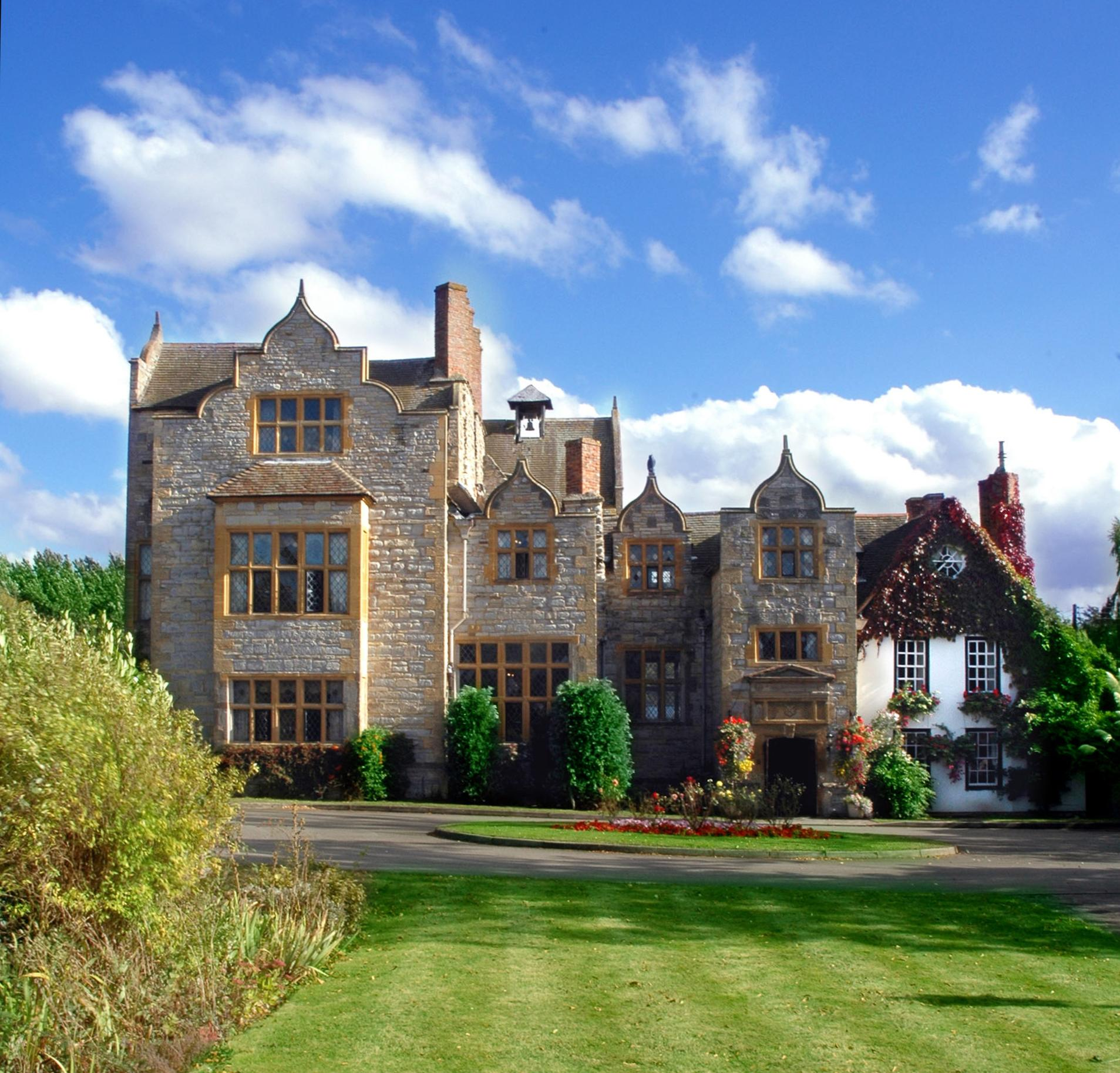
- Salford Hall in Abbot's Salford

- Location within Warwickshire
- OS grid reference: SP068502
- Civil parish: Salford Priors
- District: Stratford-on-Avon
- Shire county: Warwickshire
- Region: West Midlands
- Country: England
- Sovereign state: United Kingdom
- Post town: EVESHAM
- Postcode district: WR11
- Police: Warwickshire
- Fire: Warwickshire
- Ambulance: West Midlands

Abbot's Salford is the name of a village in the English county of Warwickshire. It is found six miles south of Alcester, about the same distance from Evesham, very close to the Worcestershire border, and is within the parish of Salford Priors. The River Avon runs close by the eastern side of the village. As well as the hotel the modest modern attractions of the village seem to be Abbot's Salford Lake, which is an excellent fishing spot, and a caravan park.

== Salford Hall ==
Building work on Salford Hall, the village's largest and grandest building, commenced in 1470 as a living place for monks from nearby Evesham Abbey. By the reign of Charles I it had become, by marriage, a seat of the Roman Catholic Stanford family. Charles Stanford, a grandson of Sir William Stanford, (d.1558), Justice of the Common Pleas, completed the building of Salford Hall, and commemorated the event by hanging up a bell on the top of the house bearing the inscription "Charles Stanford, Esqre., Ellinor, 1610" (for Eleanor Alderford, his wife). His son, John Stanford of Salford Hall, was a Cavalier and was killed in 1649. The Great Hall has a four-centred fireplace in the south wall, and in the east wall a doorway with a 17th-century pediment and shield with the arms of the Stanfords, who resided there until 1812. It is now used as a country house hotel, and is classed as a Grade I listed building.

== Convent ==
From 1808 to 1838, the Hall functioned as a nunnery before reverting to a private dwelling. The nuns concerned were Benedictines who had been exiled from Cambrai in France by the French Revolution, and who were to build Stanbrook Abbey to move into in 1838.
