= Marchioness of Hertford =

Marchioness of Hertford is the title given to the wife of the Marquess of Hertford. The title has been held by several women, including:

- Isabella Ingram-Seymour-Conway, Marchioness of Hertford (1759-1834)
- Maria Seymour-Conway, Marchioness of Hertford (1771-1856)
- Emily Seymour, Marchioness of Hertford (1816-1902)
- Mary Seymour, Marchioness of Hertford (1846-1909)
