= Alcester Academy =

Location
- Gerard Road; Alcester, Warwickshire, B49 6QQ; England
- Coordinates: 52.2231°N 1.8508°W

Information
- Type: Academy
- Motto: To be the best that we can be
- Local authority: Warwickshire
- Department for Education URN: 137172 Tables
- Ofsted: Reports
- Chair: Mike Dean
- Headteacher: Sarah Mellors
- Gender: Coeducational
- Age: 11 to 16
- Enrolment: 598 girls and boys
- Houses: Oversley Billesley Ragley Greville
- Colour: Silver/Blue
- Website: http://www.alcesteracademy.org.uk/

Alcester Academy (formerly known as Alcester High School Technology College) is a state secondary school that educates girls and boys aged between 11 and 16, in Alcester, Warwickshire, England. It serves both Alcester and other surrounding villages such as Bidford-on-Avon.

== History ==
Alcester High School is located on the site of the old Greville High School (named after Fulke Greville, 1st Baron Brooke) which opened in 1966. When Greville closed in 1985, the students were transferred to Alcester High along with students from Bidford High School. In 2004, a £1.8m expansion programme began creating a two-storey English block with 12 new classrooms, and extensions to the art and music blocks.

Alcester High became a specialist technology college in 1998 with an investment of £250,000. After being awarded 'high performing' status as a Technology College, Alcester High School was invited to apply for a second subject specialism. After a great deal of consultation and planning it was decided to apply for music specialism. This was approved by the Secretary of State for Education and the school became a specialist music college in 2006.

Previously a community school administered by Warwickshire County Council, in August 2011 Alcester High School Technology College converted to academy status and was renamed Alcester Academy.

== Results ==
Percentage of year 11 students gaining 5 or more grades A* to C at GCSE level:

- 2010: 55%
- 2011: 59%
- 2012: 61%

== Awards ==
In 2016, Alcester Academy's maths department won Maths Team of the Year at the Times Education Supplement (TES) Schools Awards. The Academy was the only secondary school in Warwickshire to be nominated for the awards.

Alcester Academy's rock academy won school of music award for the west midlands and got nominated for the awards. Drew abbots former teacher at the school said "I'm so proud of what we have done" - 2023
