= Howard Bennett =

English cricketer

Howard Alfred Bennett (20 August 1892 – 13 January 1973) was an English cricketer. Bennett was a right-handed batsman and leg-break bowler who played for Northamptonshire. He was born in Alcester, Warwickshire and died in Southbourne, Bournemouth.

Bennett made a single first-class appearance for the side, during the 1920 season. In the two innings in which he batted, he scored a single run. He bowled six overs during the match, conceding 51 runs.
