= Arrow, Warwickshire =

Village in Warwickshire, England

Coordinates: 52.20689°N 1.884198°W

Arrow
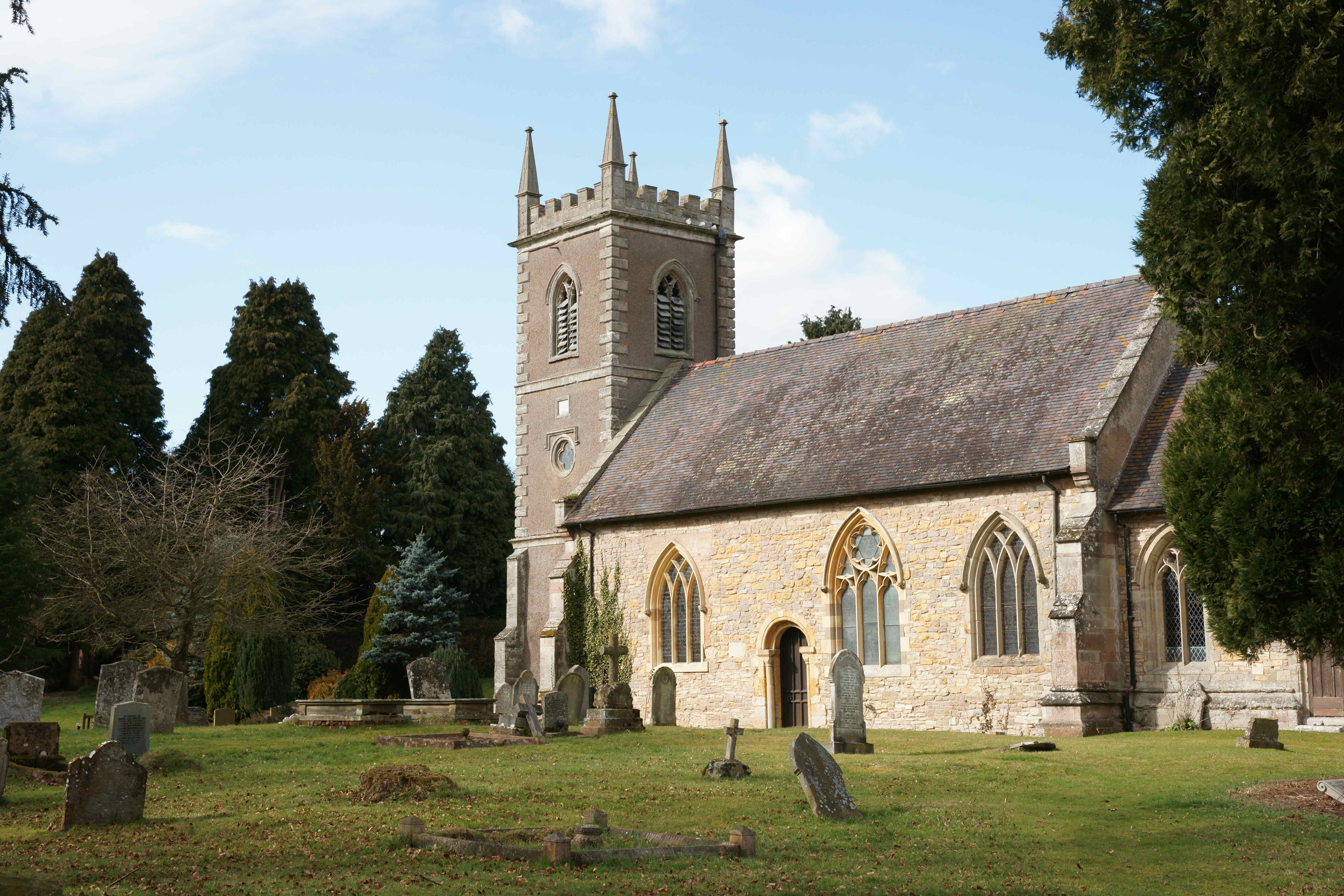

- Location within Warwickshire
- Population: 208 (2001 census)
- OS grid reference: SP080565
- Civil parish: Arrow with Weethley
- District: Stratford-on-Avon
- Shire county: Warwickshire
- Region: West Midlands
- Country: England
- Sovereign state: United Kingdom
- Post town: ALCESTER
- Postcode district: B49
- Dialling code: 01789
- Police: Warwickshire
- Fire: Warwickshire
- Ambulance: West Midlands

Arrow is a village in the Stratford-on-Avon district of Warwickshire, England. Together with the entirely rural hamlet of Weethley, it forms since 1 April 2004 the civil parish of Arrow with Weethley. The parish lies midway between Redditch and Evesham. From Alcester the River Arrow flows southwards to the river Avon, and to the west of the river the present road to Evesham joins that to Worcester at a busy junction where, near the Old Toll House, stands the hamlet of Arrow, a group of modernized black and white farm workers' cottages which have risen up the social scale to become homes for business people. Arrow with Weethley parish falls under the local government district and parliamentary constituency of Stratford-on-Avon, and the Church of England Diocese of Coventry. In 2001 the parish had a population of 208.

== History ==
In 710, according to the chronicles of Evesham Abbey, Ceolred, King of Mercia, gave land in ARROW to the abbey. It was subsequently wrested from them but regained by Abbot Agelwy II (1070–7), only to be lost again to Odo, Bishop of Bayeux, who at the time of the Domesday Survey held 7 1/2 hides. Arrow Mill was mentioned in the Domesday Book of 1086, and is now a hotel and restaurant as well as a working water mill.

=== Manors ===
There were originally three manors, Arrow Manor, Ragley Hall and Oversley Manor. In the 12th century William de Camville of Clifton, acquired the manor of Arrow through his marriage and it remained in that family and its cadets until about 1500 when it passed by marriage to Sir Hugh Conway. In the 17th century it became united through this family with Ragley Hall. The latter was held in 1370 by Sir John Rous. In October 1591 it was sold to Sir John Conway. Thereafter Ragley became the principal seat of the Conway family in the 17th century and follows the same descent as the manor of Arrow.

In the village are the gates to Ragley Hall which has been home to the Marquess of Hertford's family since the mid-18th century. At the Domesday Book, the Count of Meulan, later created Earl of Leicester, held 3 hides of land in Oversley, and until the close of the Middle Ages the manor remained part of the honour of Leicester. In 1086 Fulk held the estate, but it later passed to one of the second Earl of Leicester's officials, Ralph le Boteler, who built a castle, or more likely wooden stockade, there, making it his principal seat. In the middle of the 12th century the Earl and Ralph jointly founded the monastery of Alcester, and granted to it lands in Oversley, in 1140.

On the death of William le Boteler in 1369 without male heirs the manor passed to his daughter Elizabeth, wife of Sir Robert Ferrers. In 1482 Oversley passed to Sir William Gascoigne of Gawthorpe. In 1537 Sir William Gascoigne and his son Sir Henry Gascoigne, sold the manor to Sir Thomas Cromwell. After Cromwell's attainder Henry VIII granted Oversley, in exchange for lands in Bedfordshire, to Sir George Throckmorton of Coughton, who had been anxious to acquire it for several years. From this time the manor follows the same descent as Coughton. Oversley was a valuable and extensive manor, comprising also, in 1566, the present parishes of Exhall and Wixford, part of Grafton and part, at least, of King's Broom. Charles Turberville (1767–1811), of the ancient Anglo-Norman family, was farming at Oversley when he married at Alcester in October 1791. He is buried at Arrow.

=== Church ===
The parish church of the Holy Trinity consists of a chancel with a north chapel and vestry, nave, north aisle, and west tower. The building dates from the 12th century, but the only evidence of this period is the south doorway, which may have been reset at a later period. The nave has windows of the end of the 13th century, and the chancel appears to have been rebuilt from early-to mid-14th century. The west tower is said to have been added or rebuilt in 1767. In the tower is one bell by Henry Bagley, 1657. The north aisle was added in 1865 and the rest of the building restored. The nave (49 ft. by 20 ft.) has a north arcade of three bays. In the south wall are three windows: the easternmost dating from about 1300. The west wall has a Tudor doorway. There are several tombs within the church of the Conway family, for centuries Lords of the Manor here, including Henege, an infant son of Edward Conway, who died in 1660. In the village church is a statue of one of the Marquesses sculpted by Prince Victor of Hohenlohe-Langenburg, a nephew of Queen Victoria. There is a churchyard surrounding the church.

== In popular culture ==
During the third series of the BBC drama Peaky Blinders, the main character Thomas Shelby is shown to have made his fortune and moved out of the city to the fictional Arrow House (actually Arley Hall in Cheshire).
