= Weethley =

Village in Warwickshire, England

Coordinates: 52°11′N 1°55′W

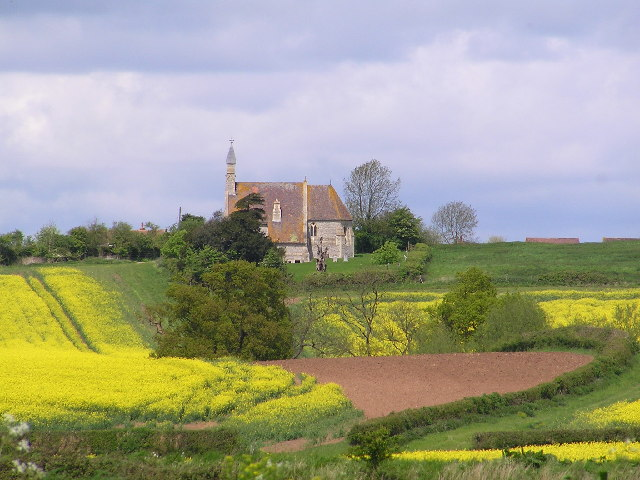
- St James's Church, Weethley

- Location within Warwickshire
- Civil parish: Arrow with Weethley
- District: Stratford-on-Avon
- Shire county: Warwickshire
- Region: West Midlands
- Country: England
- Sovereign state: United Kingdom

Weethley is a village and former civil parish on the B4088 road, now in the parish of Arrow with Weethley, in the Stratford-on-Avon district, in the county of Warwickshire, England. Weethley has a chapel of ease called St James's, Weethley. In 2001 the parish had a population of 17. On 1 April 2004 the parish was abolished and merged with Arrow to form "Arrow with Weethley". The cricketer Frank Field, who played 264 first-class matches for Warwickshire between 1897 and 1920, was born in the village.
