= Graham Rust =

English painter

Graham Rust (born 1942, Hertfordshire, England) is a painter and muralist.

== Biography ==
Graham Redgrave-Rust was born in Hertfordshire, England in 1942. He studied drawing and painting at the Regent Street Art School, the Central School of Arts and Crafts in London and the National Academy of Art in New York. For two years he worked as an artist on Architectural Forum for Time Inc. In 1968 he spent a year as artist in residence at Woodberry Forest School, in Orange, Virginia, United States.

He is internationally renowned for his murals and ceiling paintings. His most important work is the mural "The Temptation" in the entrance hall of Ragley Hall, Warwickshire, which was started in 1969 and finished in 1983. The mural was commissioned by Lord Hertford after he had seen Rust working on a mural in Virginia, USA. The Ragley Hall mural was painted using gouache directly onto the plaster, portraying a view of the Mountain of Temptation and several of Lord Hertford's relatives.

He has illustrated various books including the 1986 edition of 'The Secret Garden', by Frances Hodgson Burnett and the 1993 edition of 'Some Flowers', by Vita Sackville-West.

He has paintings in the collections of the Oxfordshire and Buckinghamshire Light Infantry Museum and Tabley House.

Graham Rust lives and works in Suffolk and illustrated a cookery book by the late Countess of Clanwilliam, who commissioned his first mural painting in 1965.

== Exhibitions ==
- 1964 The Insituto Panameneo de Arts, Panama, Drawings
- 1965 The Oxford Union, Drawings and Watercolours
- 1965 The Jason Gallery, New York, Drawings
- 1965 Duncombe Park, Yorkshire, Paintings and Drawings
- 1969 Duncombe Park, Yorkshire, Paintings and Drawings
- 1972 Hazlitt, Drawings London and Rome
- 1973 Hazlitt, Autumn in Provence
- 1975 Spink, Rust in India
- 1976 Spink, Rust in Greece
- 1977 Spink, The West Indies and other works
- 1978 Lane Crawford, Hong Kong, Drawings and Watercolours
- 1980 40 Belgrave Square and Ragley Hall, R.C.S.B. Benefit
- 1981 Gainsborough's House, Suffolk, A Travelers Sketchbook
- 1982 Spink, The Holy Land
- 1985 The Alpine Gallery, London, R.C.S.B. Benefit
- 1987 Leighton House, London, "The Painted House"
- 1987 Roger Ramsey Gallery, Chicago
- 1988 Stubbs Gallery, New York
- 1989 Robert Domergue Inc., San Francisco
- 1989 Melrose Place Gallery, Los Angeles
- 1990 Colnaghi, London, R.C.S.B. Benefit
- 1993 The Museum of Garden History, London
- 1996 Raphael Valls Gallery, London
- 1999 Marlborough House, London, Sightsavers Benefit
- 2006 The Ebury Galleries, London
- 2007 The Theatre, Chipping Norton, Oxon
- 2007 Chiesa dell'angelo, Lodi
- 2007 Neue Theatre, Espelkamp, Germany
- 2009 Mish, New York, N.Y.B.G Benefit
- 2012 The Brompton Oratory, London, Sightsavers Benefit

== Books published ==
- 1987 "The Painted House" Cassells / USA Bullfinch
- 1996 "Decorative Designs" Cassells / USA Bullfinch
- 1998 "Needlepoint Designs" Ward Locke / USA Rizzoli
- 2001 "The Painted Ceiling" Constable / USA Little Brown
- 2005 "Revisiting The Painted House" Breslich & Foss Ltd

== Books illustrated ==
- 1982 "Recipes From a Chateau In Champagne" Victor Gollancz Ltd
- 1986 "The Fruits of the Earth" Michael Joseph / USA David Godine
- 1986 "The Secret Garden" Michael Joseph / USA David Godine
- 1989 "A Little Princess" Michael Joseph / USA David Godine
- 1991 "The Secret Garden Notebook" Letts
- 1993 "Some Flowers: Vita Sackville West" Pavilion & National Trust / USA Abrams
- 1993 "Little Lord Fauntleroy" Michael Joseph / USA David Godine
- 1994 "The Fine Art of Dining" Little Brown
- 2001 "Claro en la Selva" Luis Pujadas y Ortiz, Red Lion Express
- 2007 "Food For Friends" Somerton
