= Gilbert Cox =

English cricketer

Personal information
- Born: 5 July 1908; Stroud, Gloucestershire
- Died: 31 March 1974 (aged 65); Alcester, Warwickshire
- Batting: Right-handed

Career statistics
Competition	First-class
Matches	2
Runs scored	28
Batting average	7.00
100s/50s	0/0
Top score	19
Catches/stumpings	0/–
- Source: Cricinfo, 14 April 2023

Gilbert Clifford Cox (5 July 1908 – 31 March 1974) was an English cricketer who played two first-class games for Worcestershire, his career at that level lasting for a single week in 1935 when he kept wicket for the county in place of the usual incumbent Bernard Quaife.

He did not have a successful time, making no stumpings or catches in either game he played in, and Worcestershire lost both matches by an innings. The 19 he made in the first innings on his debut against Lancashire remained his top score.

Cox was born in Stroud, Gloucestershire; he died in Alcester, Warwickshire aged 65.
