= Frank Field (cricketer, born 1874) =

English cricketer (1874–1934)

Personal information
- Full name: Ernest Frank Field
- Born: 23 September 1874; Weethley, Warwickshire, England
- Died: 25 August 1934 (aged 59); Droitwich, Worcestershire, England
- Batting: Right-handed
- Bowling: Right-arm fast

Domestic team information
- Years: Team
- 1897–1920: Warwickshire
- 1900: London County

Career statistics
| Competition | First-class |
|---|---|
| Matches | 264 |
| Runs scored | 1,900 |
| Batting average | 7.66 |
| 100s/50s | –/– |
| Top score | 39 |
| Balls bowled | 46,304 |
| Wickets | 1,026 |
| Bowling average | 23.48 |
| 5 wickets in innings | 80 |
| 10 wickets in match | 17 |
| Best bowling | 9/104 |
| Catches/stumpings | 107/– |
- Source: Cricinfo, 14 December 2022

Frank Ernest Field or Ernest Frank Field (23 September 1874 in Weethley, Warwickshire, England – 25 August 1934 in Droitwich, Worcestershire, England) was a Warwickshire fast bowler who is best remembered for sharing with Frank Foster the bowling honours in Warwickshire's flukish County Championship triumph in the abnormally dry summer of 1911 — the only time any county outside the "Big Six" (Note: The “Big Six” were Yorkshire, Lancashire, Nottinghamshire, Middlesex, Kent and Surrey) won between 1890 and 1935.

However, aside from this triumph, Field had a long career before Foster even played for Warwickshire. Indeed, if Foster's career was tragic, Field's was in many ways more so, for a succession of serious accidents hampered him at exactly the time he would otherwise have become a top-class fast bowler and a candidate for representative honours.

Field had no pretensions to be a batsman, but at his best was a bowler of considerable pace and capable of a sharp break-back on a worn or fiery pitch, as was shown most clearly in Warwickshire's crucial win against Yorkshire on a newly laid and severely criticised Harrogate pitch in 1911, when he took 7 for 20 to bowl Yorkshire out for 58. He was over 6 feet or 183 centimetres tall, broad shouldered and highly muscular, but was often criticised for not getting his arm high enough.

== Career ==
Field played his first cricket with the Pershore club, and in 1897 was engaged by a Warwickshire club desperate for a fast bowler. He gained a place in the team against Lancashire in Henry Pallett’s benefit match but was not viewed as the solution to Warwickshire’s bowling problems. Field played just three times in 1897 and took just seven wickets, but gained another trial in July the following season and a tireless 8 for 144 in an innings of 509 against Gloucestershire suggested he was a major acquisition for the county, especially as he suffered from dropped catches. In the dry summer of 1899 Field established himself as Warwickshire’s leading bowler with 73 wickets for 23 each — a remarkable performance on such true pitches as Edgbaston was then known for. His 12 for 194 against the powerful Surrey batting made many critics believe Field would become England's first-choice fast bowler within a few years. 1900 saw Field take 100 wickets for the first time, and despite rheumatism early in the season he maintained his position in 1901.

However, the sequence of tragedies that was to ruin Field’s career began the following season when extremely wet weather and the slow-drying nature of the Edgbaston ground made Field worthless for most of the season. This scenario was repeated the following season, but his value to the team on hard wickets was already unquestioned. However, in the mainly fine summer of 1904 — when his bowling would have been wanted regularly rather than occasionally — Field could only assist a few times due to rheumatism in his bowling arm and later “tennis elbow”. He broke down in every game he did play except a surprising win over Yorkshire. In 1905, Field continued to suffer from these strains, playing in about half the matches to little effect. Then in the dry summer of 1906, he suffered a heel injury in the second match (Note: This second match against Somerset was in fact the first and only match of 1906 in which Field bowled, for he did not bowl on a soft wicket against Lancashire in his first game.) and did not play again.

Doubts were expressed over Field's capacity to recover from such an appalling series of setbacks, and though he was expensive even when wanted in the wet 1907 summer, 1908 saw Field, despite having little support, have his best season yet highlighted by an impressive performance against Yorkshire (who came closer to losing a match than at any other time that year). However, a disappointing 1909 suggested that Field was past it. And though 1910 saw Field come closer to his best (notably against Yorkshire at Edgbaston when he bowled them out for 125 on a perfect pitch), there was little belief he could survive a full season of dry wickets. All expectations, though were refuted by his consistently excellent work on the lightning fast wickets of 1911, which saw him take 122 wickets in 19 games for 19.48 each — slightly better even than Foster.

However, again a wet summer where his pace was of no value prevented Field from keeping up his form, and furthers injury in 1913 at the age of thirty-seven put paid to hopes of Field having another season like 1911. Field bowled quite well in 1914, during which he achieved the phenomenal feat of taking six Worcestershire wickets for no run without the assistance of a fielder. After World War I put a stop to county cricket for four seasons, Field played a few matches with success in 1919, but was clearly unable at forty-three to bowl a full season at full pace, and retired the following season.
