= Hugh Seymour, 6th Marquess of Hertford =

British soldier, courtier and Conservative politician

Colonel The Most Honourable The Marquess of Hertford CB TD PC JP ADC
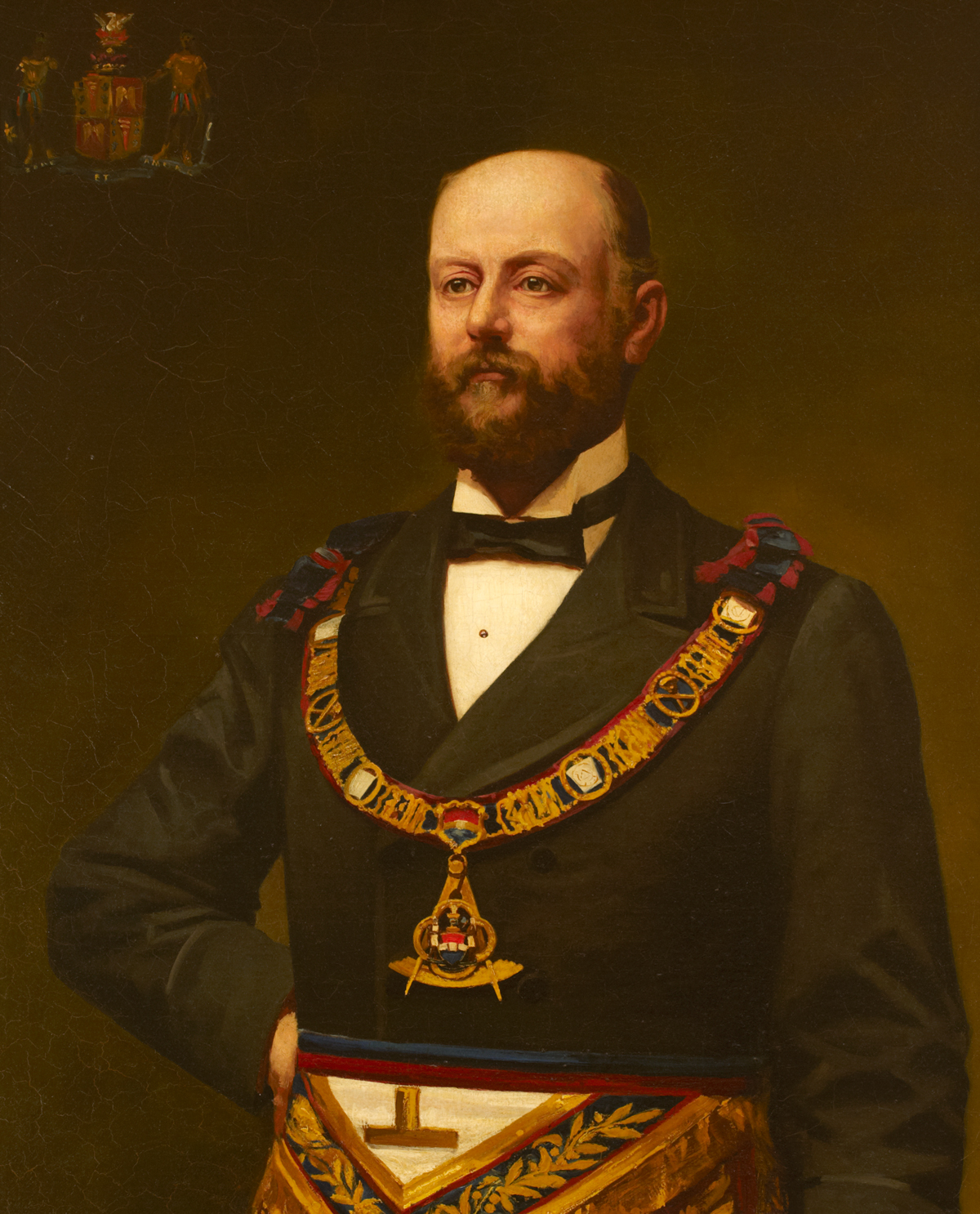
- The Marquess of Hertford wearing Masonic regalia

Comptroller of the Household
- In office 21 February 1879 – 21 April 1880
- Monarch: Victoria
- Prime Minister: The Earl of Beaconsfield
- Preceded by: Lord Henry Somerset
- Succeeded by: The Lord Kensington

Personal details
- Born: 22 October 1843 Dublin, Ireland
- Died: 23 March 1912 (aged 68) Ragley Hall, Warwickshire, England
- Party: Conservative
- Spouse: Hon. Mary Hood (m. 1868; died 1909)
- Children: 8;include George Seymour, 7th Marquess of Hertford
- Parents: Francis Seymour, 5th Marquess of Hertford; Lady Emily Murray

Colonel Hugh de Grey Seymour, 6th Marquess of Hertford, CB, PC, TD, JP, ADC (22 October 1843 – 23 March 1912), styled Earl of Yarmouth from 1870 to 1884, was a British soldier, courtier and Conservative politician. He notably served as Comptroller of the Household between 1879 and 1880.

== Background ==
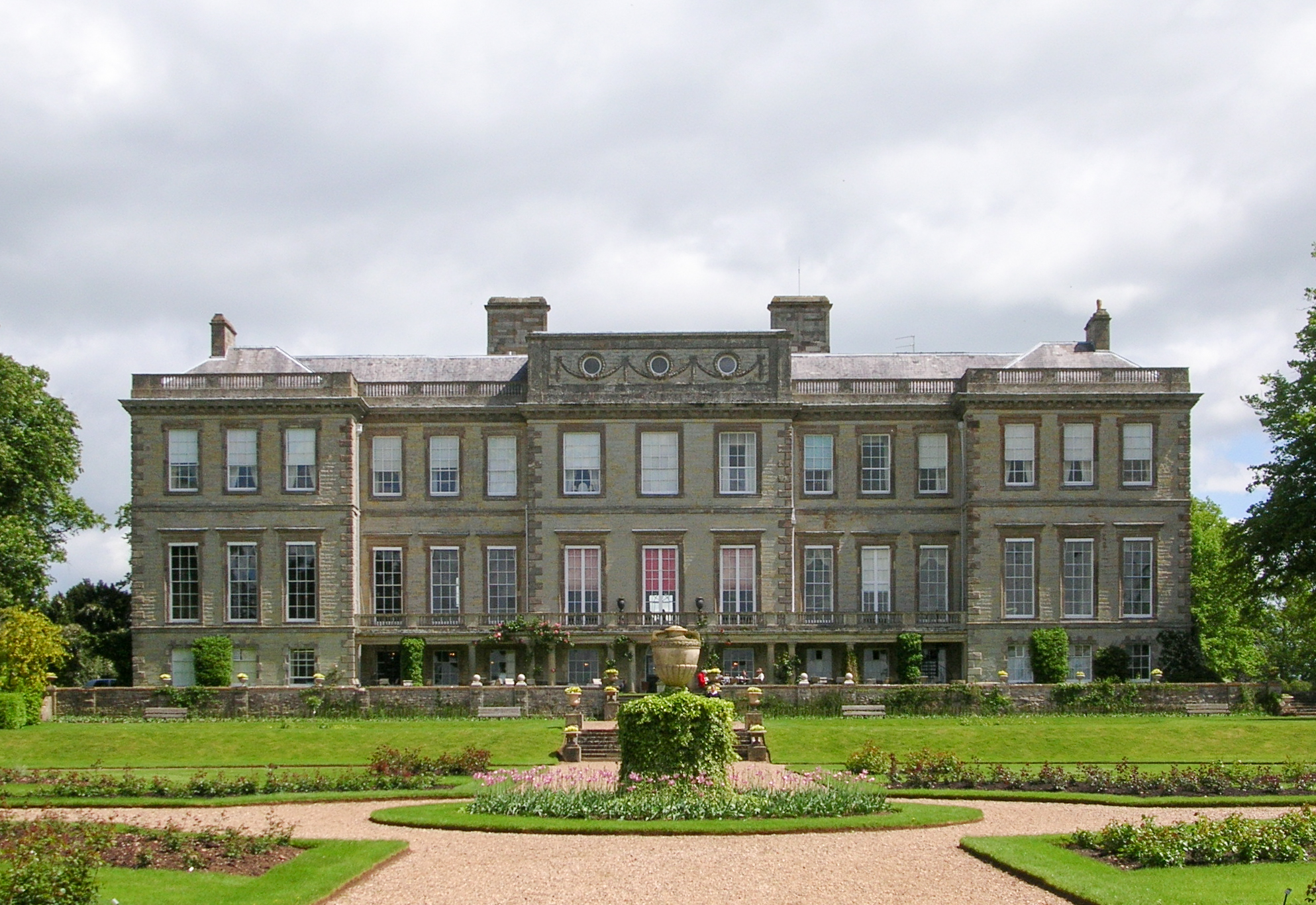
Ragley Hall from the south-west.

A member of the Seymour family headed by the Duke of Somerset, Seymour was born in Dublin, Ireland, the eldest son of Francis Seymour, 5th Marquess of Hertford, by his wife Lady Emily Murray, daughter of David Murray, 3rd Earl of Mansfield. He was the grandson of Sir George Seymour and great-grandson of Lord Hugh Seymour and the nephew of George Seymour and Lady Laura Seymour. He became known by the courtesy title Earl of Yarmouth when his father succeeded to the marquessate of Hertford in 1870.

== Military career ==
Seymour served in the Grenadier Guards, achieving the rank of captain. He was also Honorary Colonel of the Warwickshire Yeomanry and was awarded the Territorial Decoration. He was appointed an aide-de-camp to King Edward VII in the 1902 Coronation Honours list on 26 June 1902, with the regular rank of colonel. He served as such until the King's death in 1910, and was re-appointed ADC to King George V from 1910 until his own death in 1912. In June 1906 he was made a Companion of the Order of the Bath (CB) in the 1906 Birthday Honours.

== Political career ==
Seymour was returned to parliament as one of two representatives for Antrim in 1869. At the 1874 general election he was returned for South Warwickshire, a seat he held until 1880. In 1879 he was sworn of the Privy Council and appointed Comptroller of the Household under Lord Beaconsfield, a post he retained until the government fell the following year. In 1884 he succeeded his father in the marquessate and entered the House of Lords.

In 1905 Lord Hertford was appointed Lord-Lieutenant of Warwickshire, which he remained until his death. He was also a Justice of the Peace for County Antrim. In 1906 he was appointed a Companion of the Order of the Bath (CB).

== Family ==
Lord Hertford married the Honourable Mary Hood, daughter of Alexander Hood, 1st Viscount Bridport, on 16 April 1868. They had eight children:

- Lady Margaret Alice Seymour (1869–1901), married shipowner James Hainsworth Ismay and had issue
- George Francis Alexander Seymour, 7th Marquess of Hertford (1871–1940)
- Lady Emily Mary Seymour (1873–1948), married Reverend Reginald Walker and had issue
- Lady Victoria Frederica Wilhelmina Georgina Seymour (1874–1960), married Charles Trafford and had issue
- Lady Jane Edith Seymour (1877–?), married Major Hugh Carleton
- Brigadier-General Lord Henry Charles Seymour (1878–1939), married Lady Helen Grosvenor, a daughter of the 1st Duke of Westminster and had issue, including Hugh Seymour, 8th Marquess of Hertford, and Lady Margaret Hay
- Lord Edward Beauchamp Seymour (1879–1917), married Elfrida de Trafford
- Commander Lord George Frederick Seymour (1881–1940), married Norah Skipworth and had issue

The Marchioness of Hertford died in April 1909, aged 62, while on a voyage to Palestine. Lord Hertford died at Ragley Hall, Warwickshire, in March 1912, aged 68. He was succeeded in the marquessate by his eldest son, George.

Parliament of the United Kingdom
Preceded by Hon. Edward O'Neill; Henry Seymour	Member of Parliament for Antrim; 1869–1874; With: Hon. Edward O'Neill	Succeeded by Hon. Edward O'Neill; James Chaine
Preceded by Henry Wise; John Hardy	Member of Parliament for South Warwickshire; 1874–1880; With: Sir John Eadley-Wilmot, Bt	Succeeded by Sir John Eadley-Wilmot, Bt; Hon. Gilbert Leigh
Political offices
Preceded by Lord Henry Somerset	Comptroller of the Household; 1879–1880	Succeeded by The Lord Kensington
Honorary titles
Preceded by The Lord Leigh	Lord Lieutenant of Warwickshire; 1905–1912	Succeeded by The Marquess of Northampton
Peerage of Great Britain
Preceded by Francis Seymour	Marquess of Hertford; 1884–1912	Succeeded by George Seymour
