= River Alne =

River in Worcestershire and Warwickshire, England

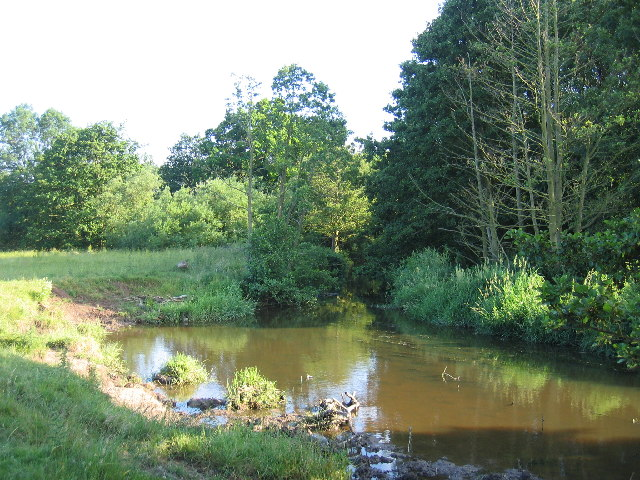
- River Alne near Henley-in-Arden

Location
- Country: England
- County: Warwickshire, Worcestershire

Physical characteristics
- Source
  - location: Wood End
- Mouth: River Arrow
  - location: Alcester
  - coordinates: 52°19′40″N 1°51′53″W

The River Alne is a tributary of the Arrow and has its headwaters to the north of Wootton Wawen.

== Course ==
Its source is at Pink Green (just inside Worcestershire) near Wood End; it then flows east into Warwickshire, close to Tanworth-in-Arden and on to Henley-in-Arden, where several changes to the original course of the river have been made in the past to prevent flooding. To the south near Wootton Wawen it is the main feeder for Wootton Pool. The river continues to flow generally southwards before joining with the River Arrow at Alcester, which itself joins the River Avon near Salford Priors.

== Watermills ==
The first water mill was named on the early O.S.Maps as Tanworth Flour Mill although it is approximately 3/4 mile south-east of Danzey Green. There was also a windmill nearby which was dismantled and re-erected at Avoncroft Museum. Both mills continued to exist in the 20th century although they were both shown as disused on the immediate postwar maps. Next downstream was Botley Mill off Tanworth Lane. This is shown on the first O.S. maps but appears to have become disused in the mid 19th century.

Henley Corn Mill was at the north end of the Henley-in Arden between the old station, later the goods yard, and the High Street. Again this existed into the 20th century and is fondly remembered by older residents who used the mill pond as a swimming pool in summer, but again seems to have become disused by the second world war. The next mill is Blackford Corn Mill approximately 1 mile south of Henley. This mill existed into the 20th century and even in the late 1960s the mill machinery was largely intact, but the sluice gates had been damaged and some of the timber mill machinery was deteriorating. There was a large corn mill in Wootton Wawen, a large four-storey building in the village alongside the main road. It is stated that it was modernised with a turbine rather than a wheel and the Spencer family, the owners, supplied high-class flour over a large area. By the mid 20th century it was out of use and utilised for many years as a lawnmower warehouse, but more recently has been converted to luxury flats.

Approximately 1 mile further downstream was Pennyford Mill, which was used to make screws and bolts. Almost adjacent was the Gray Corn Mill, and then a mile or so away was Aston Cantlow Mill which is shown as powering of a small cycle works. All of these no longer exist although traces of the water courses can be seen.

The next large mill was Great Alne Corn Mill, which still exists.

Hoo Mill in Haselor is also powered by the river between Great Alne and Alcester and is considered to be the most complete traditional water-mill in the area. It still retains an internal waterwheel, which is still operational with a complete, but a disused set of corn milling machinery, including an unusual sack hoist system. Constructed in 1810, the mill was also used for needle pointing. The last owner generated his own hydroelectricity using a turbine. information from o/s maps and personal memory (suggest refer to NLS maps)
