= Kinwarton Dovecote =

Historic dovecote in Kinwarton, Warwickshire, England

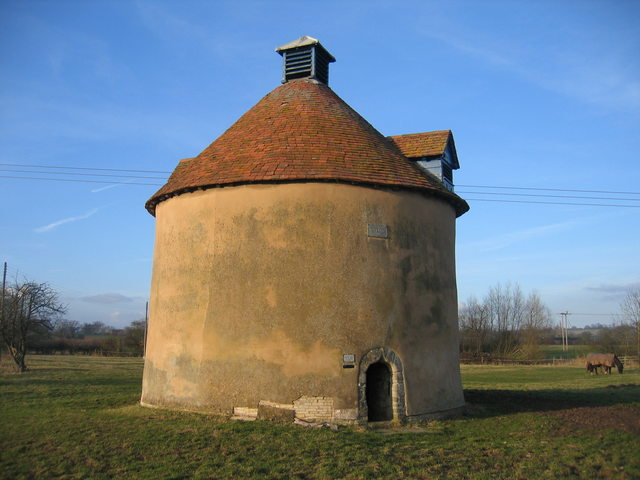
- Interactive map of Kinwarton Dovecote
- Location: Kinwarton, Warwickshire, England
- Coordinates: 52.22419°N 1.84638°W
- OS grid reference: SP 10589 58459

Listed Building – Grade I
- Official name: Church of St Mary the Virgin: Dovecote approximately 105 metres north east
- Designated: 1 February 1967
- Reference no.: 1365691

Scheduled monument
- Official name: Kinwarton Dovecote
- Reference no.: 1005748

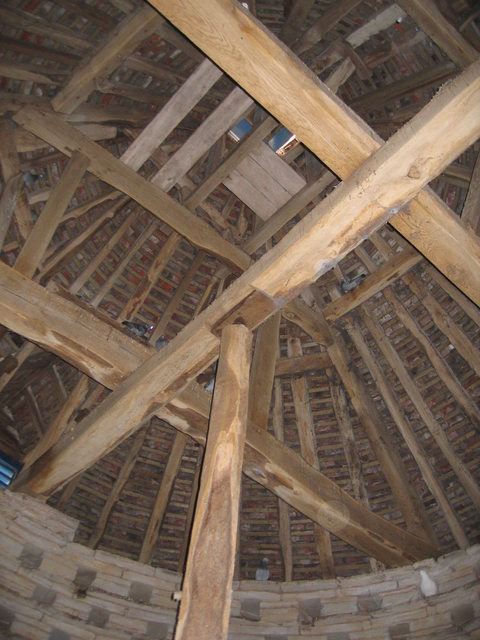
Inside Kinwarton Dovecote.

Kinwarton Dovecote is circular 14th-century dovecote situated on the edge of the village of Kinwarton, near Alcester, Warwickshire, England. The dovecote is in the ownership of the National Trust and is a scheduled monument.

The building still houses doves to this day and is noted for its "potence" (a pivoted ladder) which provides access to the nesting boxes.
