= Alcester Abbey =

Abbey in Alcester, Warwickshire, England

Coordinates: 52°13′07″N 1°52′24″W

Alcester Abbey was a Benedictine monastery in Alcester, Warwickshire in England, founded in 1138 by the Botellers of Oversley, Warwickshire. Its many endowments included the Chapel of St. James and St. Peter, near Shaftesbury, Dorset; the manor of Blynfield in the parish of St. James, which is known as the 'Manor of Alcester and Bec'; and a number of other churches and estates.

The last of its priors was Richard Tutbury, from 1459 to 1466. In 1467 it was annexed by Evesham Abbey, from whence it had a prior or warden who was an Evesham monk. In 1536 its ownership was transferred to the politician Thomas Cromwell. Little now remains of the site.
