= Hugh Seymour, 8th Marquess of Hertford =

British aristocrat

Hugh Edward Conway Seymour, 8th Marquess of Hertford (29 March 1930 – 22 December 1997) was a British aristocrat. He was the son of Brig.-Gen. Lord Henry Charles Seymour and Lady Helen Grosvenor. He was the grandson of both Hugh Seymour, 6th Marquess of Hertford and Hugh Grosvenor, 1st Duke of Westminster.

== Early life ==
He was educated at Ludgrove School and Eton College. He inherited the title of Marquess of Hertford in 1940 at the age of 9. Before inheriting the title, he had been unaware that he had a marquess for an uncle. He discovered he had inherited his uncle's title by reading about it in a newspaper while sick in bed.

== Marriage and family ==
On 10 July 1956, Hugh Seymour married Pamela Thérèse Louise de Riquet, Comtesse de Caraman-Chimay (daughter of Lieutenant-Colonel Prince Alphonse de Chimay and Mary Hamilton, granddaughter of the Duke of Abercorn by his son Lord Ernest Hamilton). Princess Alice, Duchess of Gloucester, Prince Edward, Duke of Kent, Princess Alexandra of Kent, and Mary, Duchess of Beaufort attended their wedding at St James's Church, Piccadilly.

They had four children:

- Henry Jocelyn Seymour, 9th Marquess of Hertford (born 1958)
- Lady Carolyn Mary Seymour (born 1960)
- Lady Diana Helen Seymour (born 1963); married firstly, Timothy Verdon. She married secondly, Henry Beaumont, grandson of Wentworth Beaumont, 2nd Viscount Allendale
- Lady Anne Katherine Seymour (born 1966)

His only sibling, Lady Margaret Hay, served as Lady-in-Waiting to HRH Princess Elizabeth from 1947–52, and then as a Woman of the Bedchamber to The Queen from 1953–75.

He died at the age of 67 from a brain tumour.

== Legacy ==
Lord Hertford notably saved his family home, Ragley Hall, Warwickshire, from demolition after he inherited it in 1940. In 1958 he was one of the first peers to open his country house to the paying public. He also commissioned artist Graham Rust to paint an epic mural and ceiling painting over the grand staircase. Work started in 1969 and finished in 1983. The finished mural portrayed a view of the Mountain of Temptation on the ceiling and several of Lord Hertford's relatives and godparents to his children behind the trompe-l'œil balustrade of the trompe-l'œil landing.

He was interviewed on film by the author Margaret Powell, who wrote the popular book Below Stairs that would lead to television shows such as Upstairs, Downstairs and Downton Abbey.

Peerage of Great Britain
Preceded by George Seymour	Marquess of Hertford; 1940–1997	Succeeded by Henry Seymour
