= Cotswold Hills League =

English cricket league

The Cotswold Hills League is a cricket league made up of clubs from Warwickshire, Worcestershire and Gloucestershire. The spine of the geographic area covered by the League is a picturesque part of England known as The Cotswolds.

The League was founded in 1981 when it consisted of 10 teams whose First XIs played in a single division with a completely separate division for their Second XIs.

As of 2026 there are 7 divisions from Premier to 5, with a regional split in Division 5, meaning 70 teams in total in the league structure.

In each division, every team plays each other on a home and away basis competing for promotion or to avoid relegation at the end of the season. Matches are played on Saturdays over 18 weeks, usually commencing with the first Saturday in May. These matches, based on a limited overs one-day format, consist of 90 overs, with the side batting first allowed a maximum of 45 overs. There are restrictions on the maximum number of overs any one bowler can bowl. Points are awarded for a win, plus bonus points for batting and bowling performances.

There is also a Junior Section organised in to 5 different age groups, Under 9, Under 11, Under 13, Under 15 and Under 17. The Junior section is open to clubs who do not compete in the senior section, This has been run successfully for a number of years.

== Previous Winners ==
1981: Moreton-in-Marsh

1982: Wellesbourne

1983: Dumbleton

1984: Winchcombe

1985: Broadway

1986: Broadway

1987: Winchcombe

1988: Shipston-on-Stour

1989: Bredon

1990: Bredon

1991: Bredon

1992: Bidford-on-Avon

1993: Wellesbourne

1994: Broadway

1995: Shipston-on-Stour

1996: Shipston-on-Stour

1997: Shipston-on-Stour

1998: Shipston-on-Stour

1999: Shipston-on-Stour

2000: Exhall & Wixford

2001: Bidford-on-Avon

2002: Shipston-on-Stour

2003: Stratford Bards

2004: Overbury

2005: Exhall & Wixford

2006: Bretforton

2007: Bretforton

2008: Exhall & Wixford

2009: Bretforton

2010: Bretforton

2011: Wellesbourne

2012: Bretforton

2013: Earlswood

2014: Shipston-on-Stour

2015: Exhall & Wixford

2016: Wellesbourne

2017: Wellesbourne

2018: Wellesbourne

2019: Exhall & Wixford

2020: Bretforton (Covid-19 shortened season - group stage followed by final)

2021: Wellesbourne

2022: Wellesbourne

2023: Kineton

2024: Shipston on Stour

2025: Darylton

2026: Kineton

== 2024 Divisions ==
=== Premier Division ===
- Bretforton
- Elmley Castle (P)
- Exhall & Winford
- Kineton
- Lapworth
- Leek Wooton
- Long Itchington (P)
- Shipston-on-Stour
- Tanworth & Camp Hill
- Wellesbourne

=== Division 1 ===
- Adlestrop
- Alcester & Radley (R)
- Ashorne & Moreton Morrell
- Ashton-Under-Hill
- FISSC (P)
- Norton Lindsey & Wolverton (R)
- Rowington
- Stratford 3rd XI
- Temple Grafton
- The Lenches

=== Division 2 ===
- Bidford-on-Avon
- Kineton (R)
- Leek Wootton 2nd XI (P)
- Long Itchington 2nd XI (P)
- Mickleton
- Moreton-in-Marsh (R)
- Norton Lindsley & Wolverton 2nd XI
- Southam
- Stoneleigh
- Woodbourne

=== Division 3 ===
- Alcester & Ragley 2nd XI
- Broadway
- Claverdon
- Earlswood 3rd XI
- Great Alne (R)
- Henley-In-Arden
- Shipston-on-Stour 2nd XI
- Tanworth & Camp Hill 2nd XI (P)
- Welford-on-Avon (P)
- Wellesbourne 2nd XI (R)

=== Division 4 ===
- Alvechurch & Hopwood 3rd Xi
- Elmley Castle 2nd XI
- Fladbury
- Hunningham (N)
- Kenilworth 3rd XI (P)
- Lapworth 2nd XI (P)
- Overbury
- Rowington 2nd XI
- Temple Grafton 2nd XI
- Warwickshire County Council Staff

=== Division 5 ===
- Alvechurch & Hopwood 4th XI
- Ashton Under-Hill 2nd XI
- Bidford-on-Avon 2nd XI
- Blockley (R)
- Bretforton 2nd XI
- Broadway 2nd XI
- Exhall & Winford 2nd XI
- Hunningham 2nd XI (N)
- Moreton-In-Marsh 2nd XI
- Norton Lindsley & Wolverton 3rd XI
- Southam 2nd XI
- Stoneleigh 2nd XI (R)
- The Lenches 2nd XI
