= Bernard Cuzner =

British artist (1877 - 1956)

- Born: 4 November 1877; Alcester in Warwickshire
- Died: 4 January 1956

Bernard Lionel Cuzner (4 November 1877 – 4 January 1956) was an English silversmith and product designer.

Cuzner was born in Alcester in Warwickshire and initially trained as a watchmaker, before showing talent as a silversmith while taking evening classes in Redditch at the Redditch School of Art. He moved to Birmingham to train at the Vittoria Street School of Jewellery and Silversmithing, and Birmingham School of Art where he was influenced by Robert Catterson Smith and Arthur Gaskin. From 1900 he taught at the school and began designing for W. H. Haseler and Liberty & Co.

He was head of the department of metalwork at the Birmingham School of Art from 1910 until 1942. His work was also part of the painting event in the art competition at the 1948 Summer Olympics.

His work was within the Arts and Crafts style with extensive handwork. He also designed, such as for Liberty's Cymric range of silverware and jewellery from 1899 as well as private commissions.

== Selected publications ==
- Bernard Cuzner, Decorative metal overlay, Dryad Press, Leicester (1931) 45 pages, 23 figures, photo and drawn
- Bernard Cuzner, A first book of Metal-work, The Dryad Press, Leicester (1931) 162 pages, 6 plates ISBN 9780905418544
- Bernard Cuzner, Silversmith's Manual, NAG Press, London, 1st edition (1935) 224 pages, 133 figures ISBN 978-0719800627
