= Bittell Reservoirs =

Reservoirs in Worcestershire, England

Coordinates: 52.371°N 1.974°W

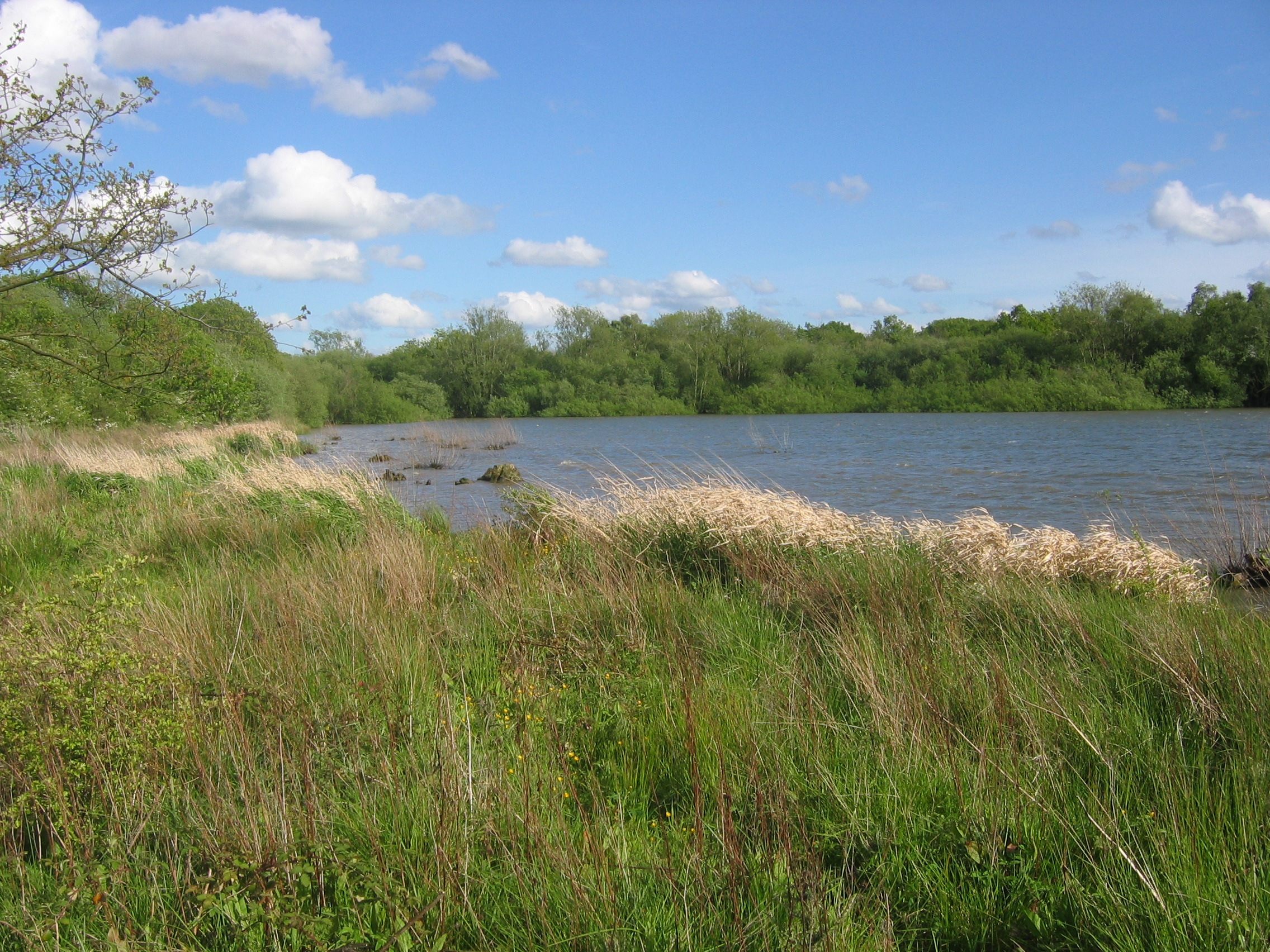
Upper Bittell, 2005

The Bittell Reservoirs (grid reference SP017748) are located in Worcestershire between Barnt Green to the south and the Birmingham district of Longbridge to the north. They consist of the Upper (Upper Bittell) and Lower (Lower Bittell) reservoir. They were built to feed the Worcester and Birmingham Canal, which was finished in the 1790s, however, the reservoir was not completed until 1837. The 'Upper' reservoir is to ensure that the level of the canal is kept sufficiently high, even in times of drought. The 'Lower' reservoir(s) are compensatory reservoirs to ensure that the local area does not become parched in dry times.

The "Upper" reservoir can be seen as a form of insurance. A dried up, i.e. unusable, canal would have been disastrous for the owners of the canal as well as the artisans and tradesmen who relied upon it for a living. The irony of the reservoir is the length of time it took to build: only 6 years after it was finished the Birmingham & Gloucester railway was built alongside, mitigating the economic reasoning behind the large investment.

The reservoirs are quite obscure nowadays, however they are used actively. Today one can fish in several places, especially on the lower reservoirs. The upper reservoir is used for sailing and windsurfing, and is the home of the Barnt Green Sailing Club. The reservoir is also used by 1st Kings Norton Sea Scout Troop who occupy a large boathouse on the south east shore. The Upper reservoir is also used for open water swimming in the summer months by the local triathlon club. One bank of the reservoir is inaccessible because it is a Site of Special Scientific Interest (SSSI). During the early 20th century, the bird life of the reservoirs was regularly recorded by the West Midland Bird Club, long before such site-monitoring became commonplace. They were also visited regularly by a young Bill Oddie.

The Telegraph (Wednesday 15 November 2017 page 32) reported that during draining of Upper Bittell they found 500 critically endangered European eels. They were rehomed in the canal that the reservoir feeds.

== See also ==
- Canals of the United Kingdom
- History of the British canal system
