= Salford Priors =

Village and civil parish in Warwickshire, England

Coordinates: 52°09′30″N 1°53′20″W

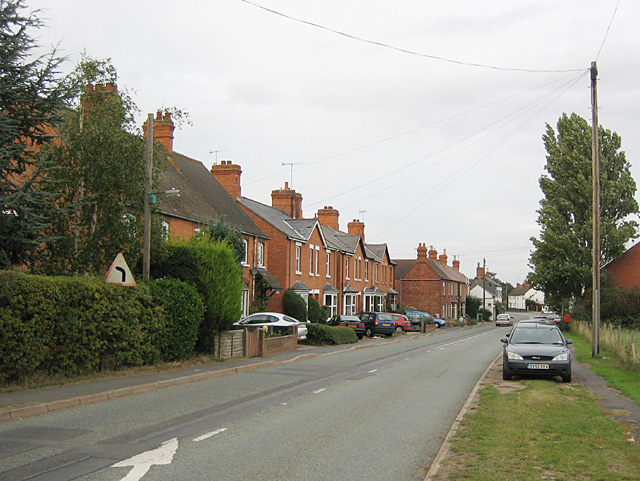
A southern part of Salford Priors

Salford Priors is a rural, agricultural village and civil parish about four miles south-west of Alcester, Warwickshire, England. The population of the civil parish as taken at the 2011 census was 1,546. It is on the Warwickshire border with Worcestershire. The village is eight miles from the popular tourist town of Stratford upon Avon, the birthplace of William Shakespeare, and the River Avon runs near to it. Evesham lies seven miles to the south-west and is an important agricultural centre and soft fruit-growing area. The population of the Salford Priors ward – which includes the communities of Abbot's Salford, Dunnington, Iron Cross, Pitchill, Rushford and Mudwalls – was 1,492 at the 2001 census.

== Local buildings ==
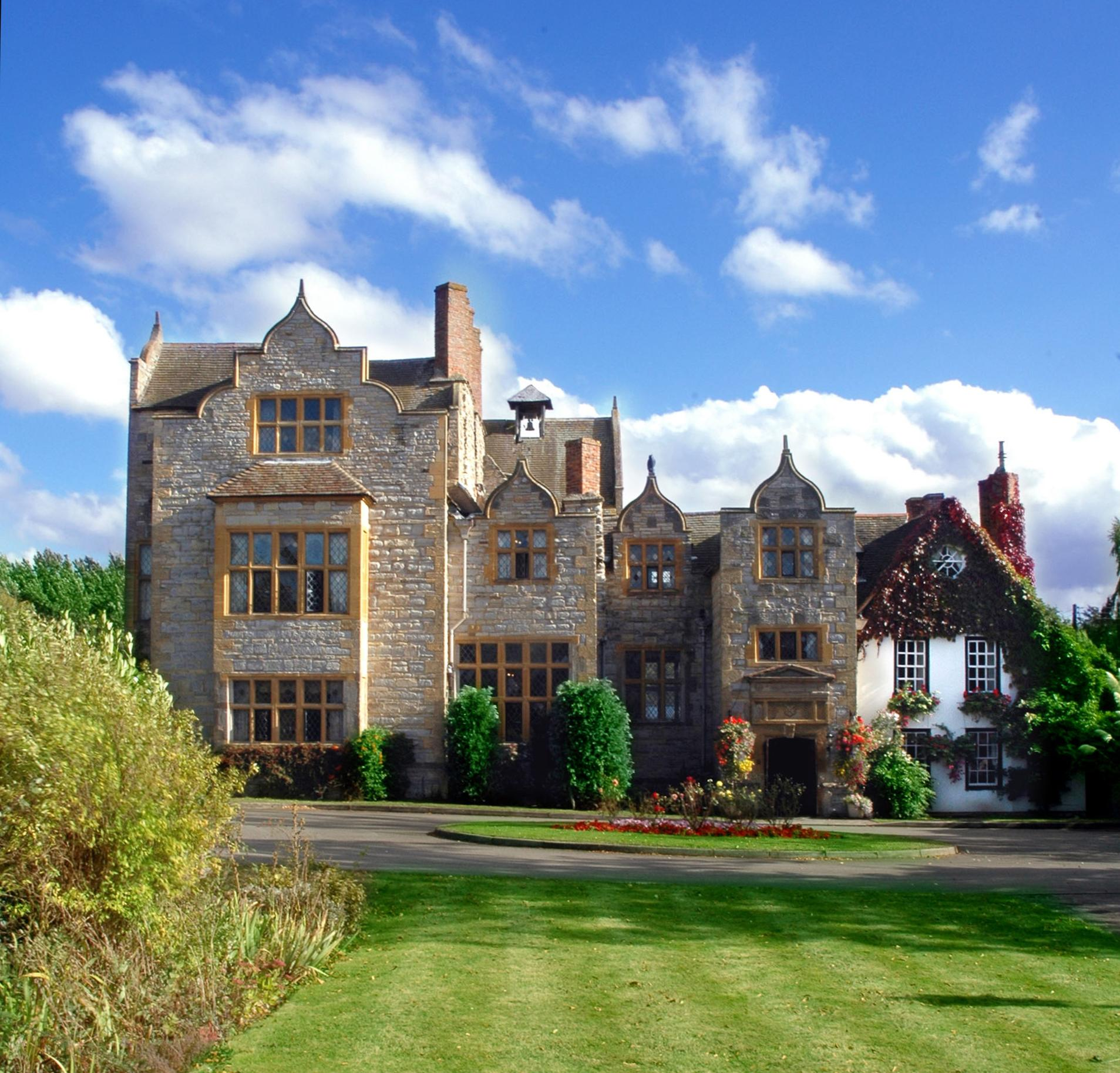
Salford Hall in Abbot's Salford

Salford Hall in Abbot's Salford belonged first to Evesham Abbey, then to Kenilworth Priory, whose history is traceable back to 708, until the Dissolution of the Monasteries after which it became a seat of the Stanford family. It is now a hotel. The village used to be served by Salford Priors railway station, opened in September 1866 on the Gloucester Loop Line between Redditch to Evesham and onto Ashchurch. However the station closed in September 1963 as a result of the Beeching Axe. The Normans - constructed St. Matthew's Church sits at the bottom of the village and is mentioned in the Domesday Book. The church has regular services and social meetings and is closely linked with the local school.

The local school is Salford Priors Church of England Primary School which admits children from the ages of 5–11. The school was founded in 1656 by William Perkins as a Free School for all of the children of the parish. Other notable buildings in Salford Priors include Park Hall. Park Hall is an elegant Victorian house built in 1880 by William Tasker in a Queen Anne style, constructed in red brick beneath a hipped roof. The house was formerly the dower house to the Ragley Hall Estate. Latterly the property was owned by War AG during the Second World War, when it was used as a hostel for the Land Army.

== Parish Council ==
Salford Priors Parish Council covers the communities of Abbot's Salford, Cock Bevington, Bevington Waste, Wood Bevington, Dunnington, Iron Cross, Pitchill, Rushford and Salford Priors. The Parish Council's responsibilities include the playing field and play area, public lighting, amenity, grass mowing, cemetery maintenance, parish floral displays, and the Best Kept Garden competition.

== Local business ==
There are three pubs (The Queens Head, The Bell at Salford Priors and The Vineyard) and a post office in the parish. For gliding enthusiasts there is an airfield two miles from Salford Priors where national and international gliding competitions are hosted. Two large businesses located in the village are connected with the agricultural industry. One, Alamo Manufacturing, makes agricultural machinery which is sold worldwide and the other is a large farm produce grower and packer that supplies many of the large supermarkets in the United Kingdom.
