= George Seymour, 7th Marquess of Hertford =

British aristocrat, theatrical dancer and actor (1871–1940)

The Most Honourable The Marquess of Hertford
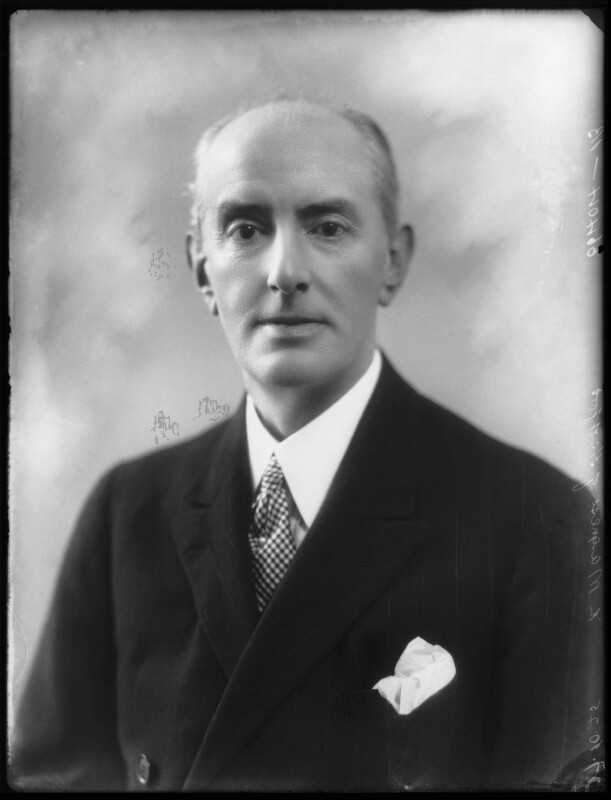
- Seymour in 1938

Personal details
- Born: George Francis Alexander Seymour; 20 October 1871 Knightsbridge, London, England
- Died: 16 February 1940 (aged 68) Torquay, Devonshire, England
- Resting place: Westminster Abbey
- Spouse: Alice Cornelia Thaw (m. 1903; ann. 1908)
- Parent(s): 6th Marquess of Hertford; Hon. Mary Hood

George Francis Alexander Seymour, 7th Marquess of Hertford (20 October 1871 – 16 February 1940) was a British aristocrat best remembered as a cross-dressing theatrical dancer, actor and fortune hunter. A member of the ancient House of Seymour, he was the son of Hugh Seymour, 6th Marquess of Hertford. From 1884 to 1912 he was known as Earl of Yarmouth.

== Early life ==
Seymour was born on 20 October 1871. He was the second child and eldest son of eight children born to Hugh Seymour, 6th Marquess of Hertford (1843–1912) and the Hon. Mary Hood. His siblings were Lady Margaret Alice Seymour (1869–1901) whose married name became Ismay, Lady Emily Mary Seymour (1873–1948), Lady Victoria Frederica Wilhelmina Georgina Seymour (1874–1960), Lady Jane Edith Seymour (b. 1877), Lord Henry Charles Seymour (1878–1939), who married Lady Helen Grosvenor, a daughter of the 1st Duke of Westminster, Lord Edward Beauchamp Seymour (1879–1917), and Lord George Frederick Seymour (1881–1940).

His paternal grandparents were Francis Seymour, 5th Marquess of Hertford, and Lady Emily Murray, daughter of David Murray, 3rd Earl of Mansfield. His maternal grandparents were Alexander Hood, 1st Viscount Bridport, a British Army officer, and Lady Mary Penelope, the daughter of Arthur Hill, 3rd Marquess of Downshire.

== Career ==
Yarmouth was commissioned into the Militia as a second lieutenant in the 3rd Battalion, the Black Watch in 1891. He was promoted to lieutenant in 1894 and resigned his commission in 1896. He was appointed a deputy lieutenant for Warwickshire in 1893.

In 1895, he was sent to Australia by his family "for the good of his health and the country", due to his blatant behaviour. Under the stage name of ‘Mademoiselle Roze’ he performed a number of dances, including an imitation of Loie Fuller, in theatres in Hobart and Melbourne.

He settled in Mackay, growing sugar cane and bananas, but quickly created great animosity, due to being a dishonest employer: he was sued by a labourer (who won the case) for underpayment, and boasted tricking kanakas who purchased his chickens into thinking gold sovereigns were less valuable than silver half-crowns.

He was noted for all-male house parties at his isolated residence 'The Rocks' near Mackay, and achieved notoriety for "skirt dancing" in a sequinned outfit with butterfly wings, as one newspaper phrased it: "gyrating in the fluffy serpentine dance before a Kanaka audience... His legs being tough and skinny his audience show little inclination to pot him as long pig." When he returned to England in 1897, a Mackay newspaper noted the citizens were "more interested in his departure" than his arrival.

In 1904 Yarmouth joined the Warwickshire Imperial Yeomanry as a second lieutenant. He transferred to the Territorial Force on its creation in 1908 and was promoted to lieutenant that year, resigning his commission in 1911. He was also a Justice of the Peace for Warwickshire.

He appeared on stage in the United States in one of Charles Frohman's companies under the name of Eric Hope.

He filed for bankruptcy in 1909 and 1910, shortly before inheriting his father's titles and estate, Ragley Hall.

=== Peerage ===
After his father's death on 23 March 1912, he succeeded as the 7th Earl of Hertford, the 7th Earl of Yarmouth, the 8th Baron Conway of Ragley, the 7th Viscount Beauchamp, the 7th Marquess of Hertford, and the 8th Baron Conway and Killultagh.

== Personal life ==
On 27 April 1903, he married heiress Alice Cornelia Thaw (1880–1955). She was the daughter of William Thaw Sr. At the wedding he extorted her parents to increase the dowry under the threat he would not go through the marriage. The marriage was annulled in 1908 due to non-consummation. As part of the divorce, all financial interests were returned to Thaw, and she resumed using her maiden name.

In May 1913, he was briefly engaged to the much older Mrs. Moss-Cockle, who'd received $3,250,000 from her former husband.

Lord Hertford died at his home in Torquay, Devonshire in 1940, aged 68 and childless. His titles passed to his nephew, Hugh Seymour.

Peerage of Great Britain
Preceded by Hugh Seymour	Marquess of Hertford; 1912–1940	Succeeded by Hugh Seymour
