= Ragley Hall =

Grade I listed historic house in Warwickshire, England

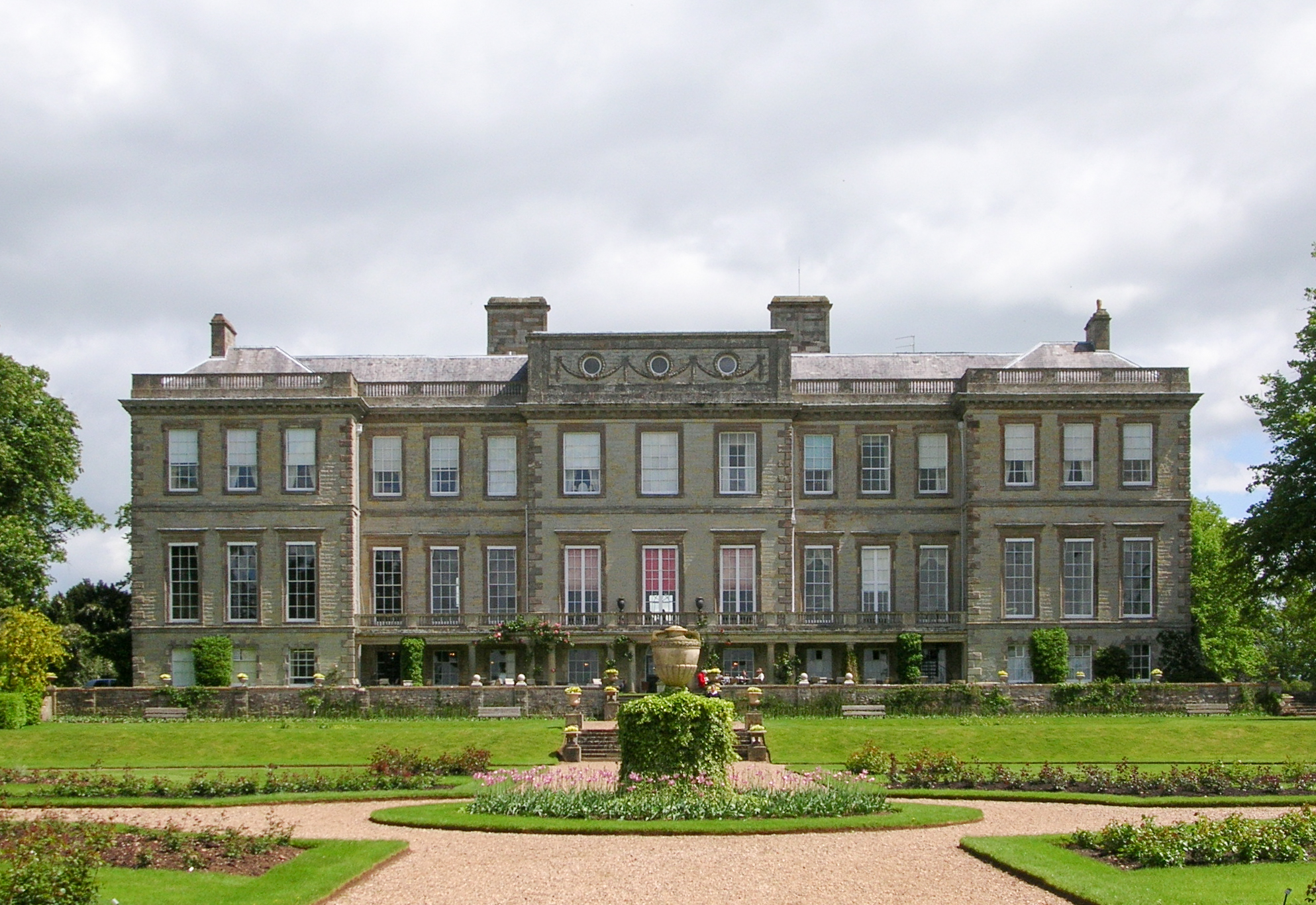
- Interactive map of Ragley Hall
- 52.19795°N 1.89611°W
- Location: Arrow, Warwickshire, England

Site notes
- Website: www.ragley.co.uk

Listed Building – Grade I
- Official name: Ragley Hall
- Designated: 1 February 1967
- Reference no.: 1355348

Listed Building – Grade II*
- Official name: Ragley Hall, Stable Block
- Designated: 1 February 1967
- Reference no.: 1024692

National Register of Historic Parks and Gardens
- Official name: Ragley Hall
- Type: Grade II*
- Designated: 1 February 1986
- Reference no.: 1001196

Ragley Hall in the parish of Arrow in Warwickshire is a stately home, located south of Alcester and eight miles (13 km) west of Stratford-upon-Avon. It is the ancestral seat of the Seymour-Conway family, Marquesses of Hertford.

Although open to the public in the past, in 2026 the house was only open for events such as weddings and as a film location; the park has a larger programme of public events.

== History ==
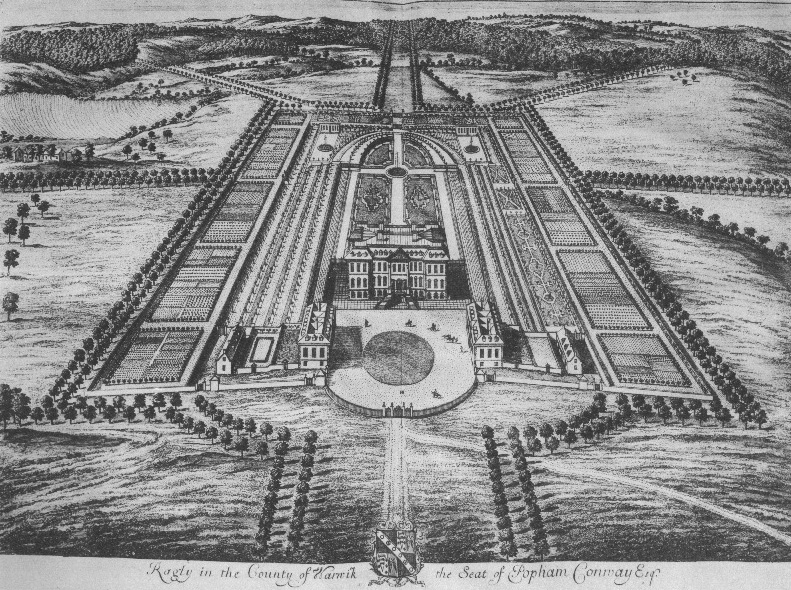
Ragley Hall illustrated by Jan Kip in Le Nouveau Théâtre de la Grande Bretagne, 1697–99

The house was built by Edward Conway, 1st Earl of Conway (1623–1683) to the designs of William Hurlbert, with modifications by Robert Hooke and was completed after his death in 1683. The interior was subsequently modified on at least three occasions, to the designs of James Gibbs circa 1750–56; of James Wyatt circa 1778–83 and of William Tasker circa 1871–73.

It became the home of Anne Conway and she was visited there by a number of notable people including Gottfried Wilhelm Leibniz, Thomas Vaughan, Lilias Skene, Henry More, Elizabeth of Bohemia, Christian Knorr von Rosenroth, the alchemist Ezekiel Foxcroft and his mother the philosopher Elizabeth Foxcroft. Franciscus Mercurius van Helmont was Anne's physician from 1671 until her death in 1679.

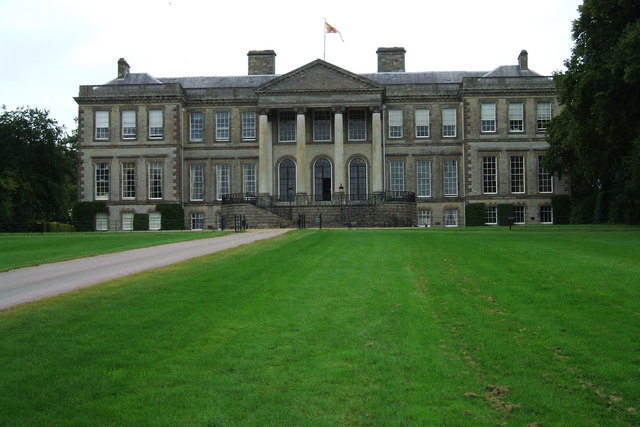
Ragley Hall's north facade

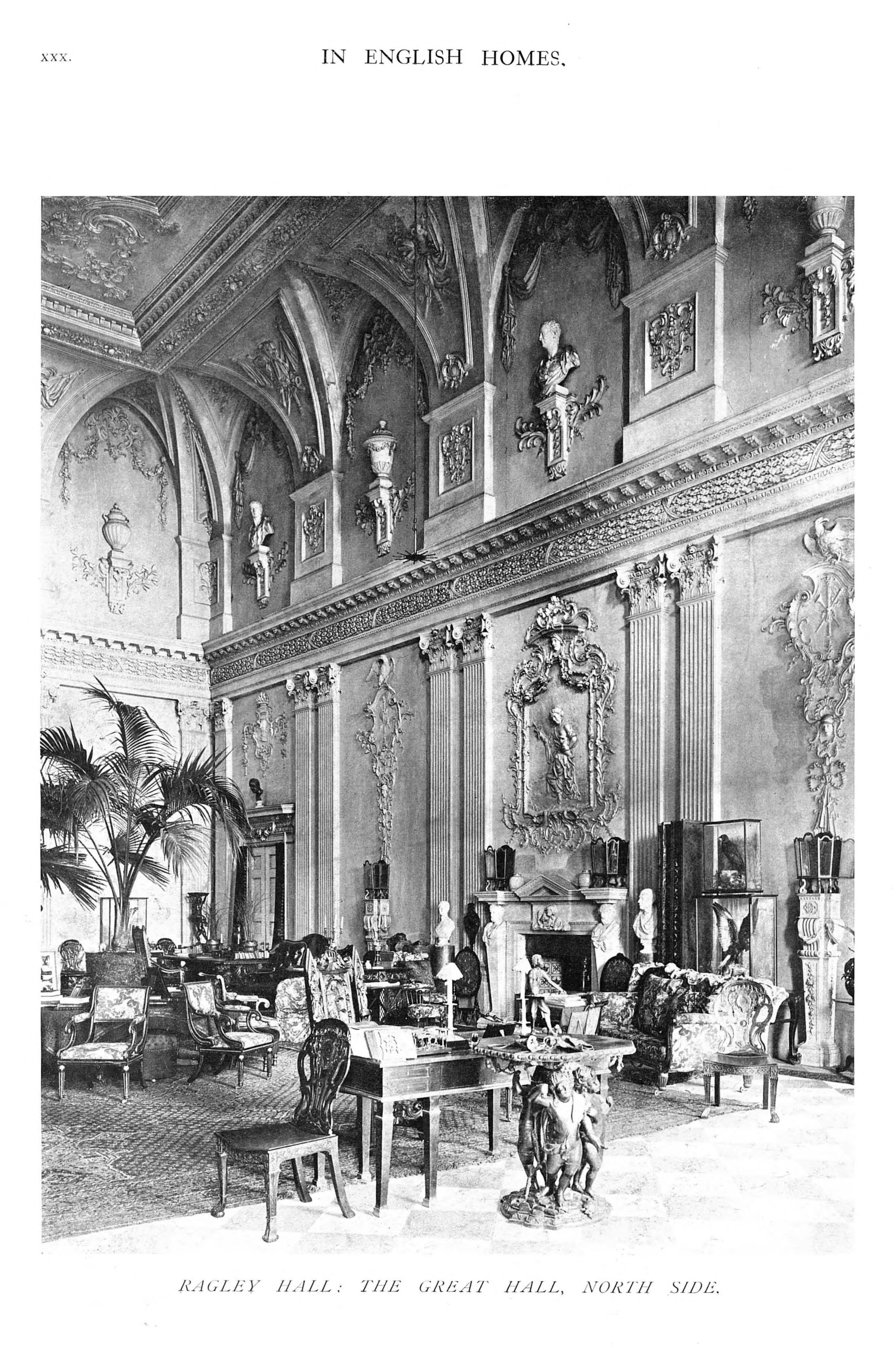
The Great Hall, north side.

The secondary seat of the Seymour-Conway family, Earls of Hertford, was Sudbourne Hall in Suffolk and their London townhouse was Hertford House. Financial instability of the Seymour family left the house threatened with demolition more than once. In 1912, following the death of Hugh Seymour, 6th Marquess of Hertford, the estate's trustees recommended that the house be demolished. However, during World War I and World War II, the house found use as a military hospital. Hugh Seymour, 8th Marquess of Hertford, who in 1940 inherited Ragley Hall from his uncle George Seymour, 7th Marquess of Hertford, fought to save it after the war. It was refurbished between 1956 and 1958, when it became one of the first stately homes opened to the public.

In 1983, the painter Graham Rust completed a huge mural including pets, friends and family members which is known as "The Temptation" and is exhibited on the Southern staircase.

Ragley was the site of the Jerwood Sculpture Park, opened in July 2004. The Park included works that won the Jerwood Sculpture Prizes, and the work of Dame Elisabeth Frink, among others. However, the site was closed in April 2012. Since 2017, the property has not been open to the general public but was available as a venue for events as of 2023. Maintenance of the park area is funded by The National Lottery Heritage Fund.

== In popular culture ==
Ragley Hall has occasionally been used as a set for filming movies and television shows, including The Scarlet Pimpernel; "The Girl in the Fireplace" episode of Doctor Who; and the fourth season of The Crown. It was also the home of Lady Cremone in Dancing on the Edge in 2013.

In 2025, Ragley Hall was also used as the venue for the four weddings held in Love Is Blind: UK season 3.
