= Alcester =

Market town and civil parish in Warwickshire, England

Coordinates: 52°12′54″N 01°52′11″W

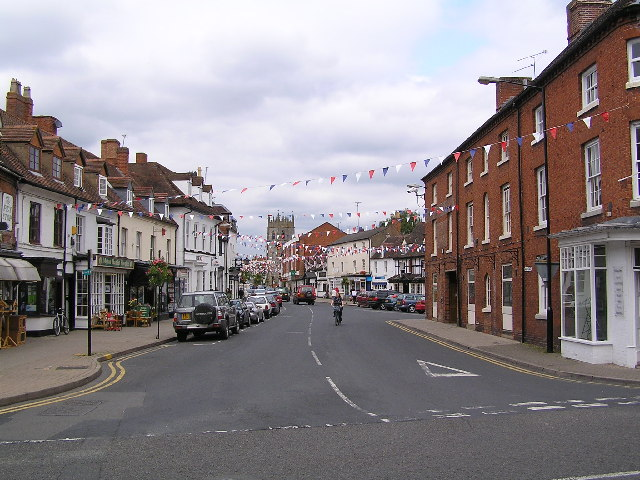
- Alcester's High Street

- Location within Warwickshire
- Population: 6,035 (2021)
- OS grid reference: SP0957
- Civil parish: Alcester
- District: Stratford-on-Avon
- Shire county: Warwickshire
- Region: West Midlands
- Country: England
- Sovereign state: United Kingdom
- Post town: ALCESTER
- Postcode district: B49
- Dialling code: 01789
- Police: Warwickshire
- Fire: Warwickshire
- Ambulance: West Midlands
- UK Parliament: Stratford-on-Avon

Alcester (/ˈɒlstər, ˈɔːl-/ OL-stər, AWL-) is a market town and civil parish in the Stratford-on-Avon District in Warwickshire, England. It is 8 mi (13 km) west of Stratford-upon-Avon, and 7 miles south of Redditch. The town dates back to the times of Roman Britain and is located at the junction of the River Alne and River Arrow.

In the 2021 census, the population of the parish was 6,035, with 6,421 in the built-up area.

== Etymology ==
The poet and antiquary John Leland wrote in his Itinerary (ca. 1538–43) that the name Alcester was derived from that of the River Alne. The suffix 'cester' is derived from the Old English word 'ceaster', which meant a Roman fort or town, and derived from the Latin 'castrum', from which the modern word 'castle' also derives.

== History ==
Alcester was founded by the Romans in around AD 47 as a walled fort. The walled town, possibly named Alauna developed from the military camp. It was sited on Icknield Street, a Roman road that ran the length of Roman Britain from south-west England to south Yorkshire. The town was also just north of the Fosse Way, another important thoroughfare in Roman Britain. By the end of the 2nd century, Roman Alcester had developed into a bustling trading and market town: a small walled area in the centre of the town was surrounded by an extensive grid of roads serving a complex of workshops and their associated housing, which specialised in trades such as tanning, metal working and pottery manufacture. Some of the houses of Roman Alcester appear to have been well endowed, with features such as heating, painted plaster and mosaic floors. Along with most Romano-British towns, it appears to have gone into decline in the 4th century when the Romans began to leave Britain. Detailed archaeological work began in the 1920s.

In the Early Middle Ages, Alencestre had become an Anglo-Saxon market town in the Kingdom of Mercia. Alcester was also the site of Alcester Abbey, a Benedictine monastery founded in 1138 by Ralph le Boteler. Richard de Tutbury, the last abbot, resigned his office in 1467 and Alcester Abbey was absorbed into the neighbouring Evesham Abbey. By 1515 Alcester Abbey was in ruins as a result of the neglect of various abbots, and later during the dissolution of the monasteries under Henry VIII it was largely demolished. The ruins were granted to the local Greville family, who used much of the stone to rebuild their family seat of Beauchamp Court.

Alcester competed in the competition for city status as part of the Platinum Jubilee Civic Honours.

== Notable buildings ==
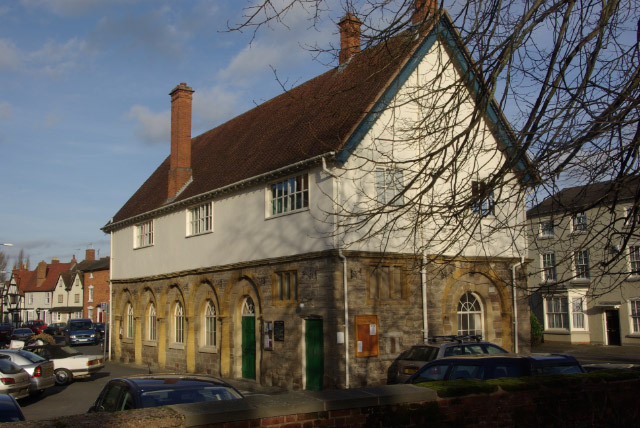
Alcester Town Hall

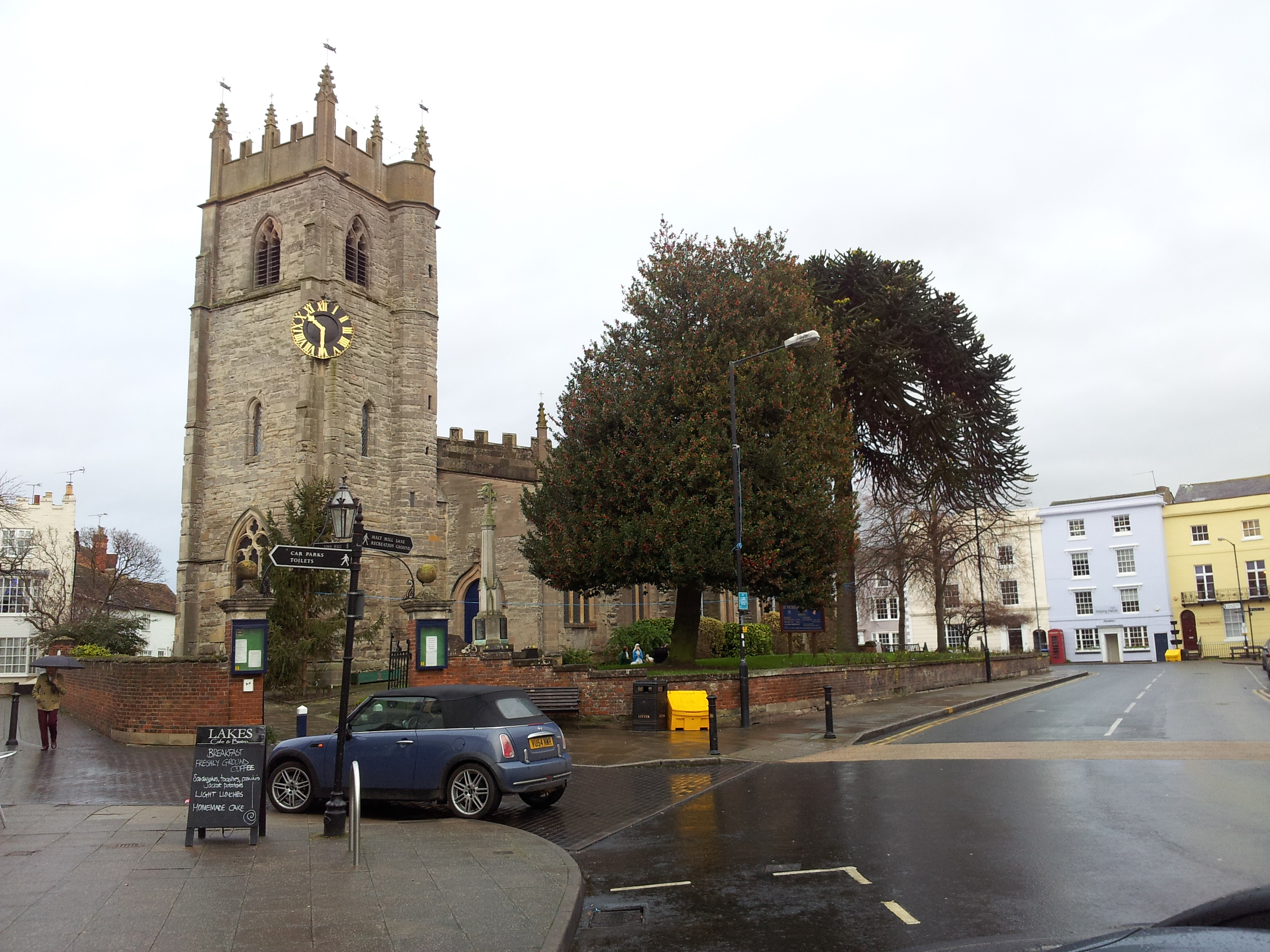
St Nicholas’s Church, with its unusual corner clock

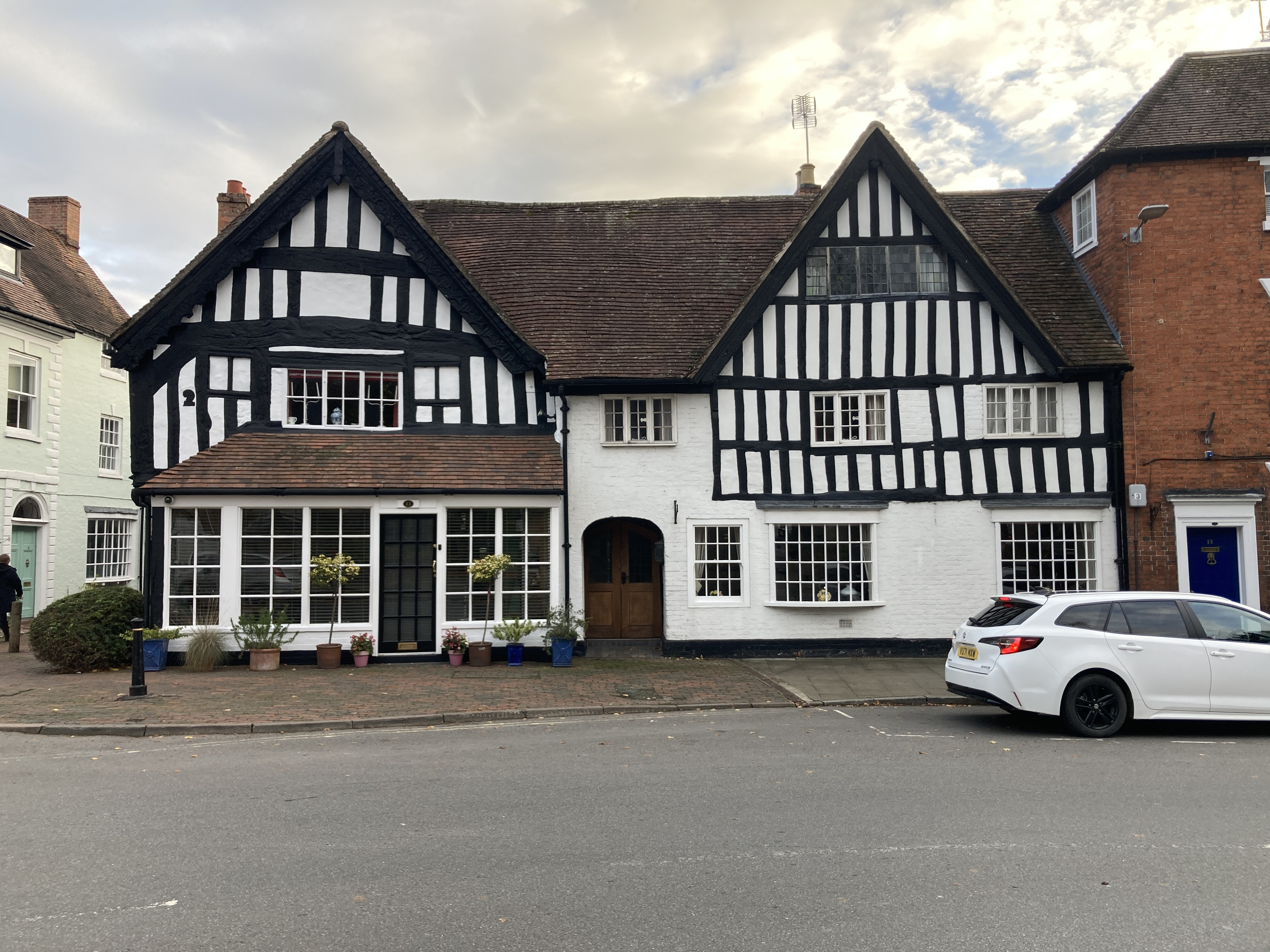
Half-timbered houses in Church Street

Today the town features architecture from the Medieval, Tudor, Georgian, Victorian eras and the 20th century. The oldest house appears to be The Old Malthouse at the corner of Church Street and Malt Mill Lane, which probably dates from about 1500.

St Nicholas's Church is a Grade II* listed building. Its clock is in an unusual position on the south-west corner of the 14th-century tower, to make it visible from the High Street. The church also houses the tomb of Fulke Greville, grandfather of poet and statesman Fulke Greville, 1st Baron Brooke. The church's Georgian nave with Doric columns and plastered ceiling is believed to have been designed by Francis Smith of Warwick, supervisor of its rebuild by the Woodward brothers of Chipping Campden in 1729.

Alcester Town Hall was built between 1618 and 1641, and is a grade I listed building.

There are some 145 Grade II and II* listed buildings in and around Alcester, including some fine examples of half-timbered construction.

== Governance ==
Alcester is split into the wards of Alcester East, Alcester West, and Salford Priors and Alcester Rural on Stratford-on-Avon District Council, represented by council leader Councillor Susan Juned, as well as Councillor Tom Ballinger (both of the Liberal Democrats), and Councillor Ashley Jones (of Reform UK), respectively.

Alcester is represented by the Alcester ward on Warwickshire County Council by Councillor James Norris, a member of the Liberal Democrats, since 2025.

Nationally, Alcester is contained in the Stratford-on-Avon parliamentary constituency, the seat of Manuela Perteghella, a Liberal Democrat, since 2024. Perteghella is the first woman and first non-Conservative to win in the seat; it was considered 'safe' for the Tories until her election.

== Transport ==
Alcester was previously served by Alcester railway station belonging to the Midland Railway (later part of the LMS Railway), on the Gloucester Loop Line, branching off the Birmingham and Gloucester Railway main line at Ashchurch, passing through Evesham, Alcester and Redditch and rejoining the main line at Barnt Green, near Bromsgrove. The loop was built to address the fact that the main line bypassed most of the towns it might otherwise have served, but it took three separate companies to complete, Alcester being on the Evesham and Redditch railway prior to absorption by the Midland.

In addition a branch line provided by the Alcester Railway Company (later part of the Great Western Railway) ran from Alcester to Bearley, thus giving access to Stratford-upon-Avon. This line, however, was an early casualty, closing in September 1939. The Midland loop was due to close between Ashchurch and Redditch in June 1963 but the poor condition of the track led to all trains between Evesham and Redditch being withdrawn in October 1962 and replaced by a bus service for the final eight months. Redditch to Barnt Green remains open on the electrified Birmingham suburban network.

Currently, Alcester is served by one regular bus route, the hourly Stagecoach Midlands-operated X19 between Redditch and Stratford-upon-Avon. The Diamond West Midlands-operated route 247 operates irregularly through Alcester between Redditch and Evesham.

== Current attractions ==
Alcester is also known for two nearby stately homes. To the north is Coughton Court, the family seat of the Throckmorton baronets and a National Trust property. To the south-west is Ragley Hall, the home of the Marquis of Hertford, whose gardens contain a children's adventure playground.

Kinwarton, which is just north of Alcester, contains a church of Anglo Saxon origin and a historic dovecote, Kinwarton Dovecote, which is also a National Trust property. Alcester is also a significant town on the 100-mile-long Heart of England Way long-distance trail. Recent developments, carried out by a multi-agency partnership, include 'Roman Alcester', a museum exhibiting locally found archaeological artifacts from the 1st to 4th century. 2024 marked the 20th anniversary of its opening.

== Annual events ==
In early June, Alcester holds the Court Leet charity street market with a procession and competitions for best stall and best fancy dress. On the first Monday and Tuesday in October, Alcester holds an annual mop fair where amusement rides, side stalls and food booths line the High Street, Church Street and Henley Street. The mop fair has gradually decreased in size over a period of years, likely an external influence since the people of Alcester still flock to the streets during the two nights.

The Alcester and Forest of Arden Food Festival is held every May and October. The St Nicholas Night Fair is held on 6 December each year. The annual duck race takes place on the 2nd Saturday in July to raise funds for the summer bunting and Christmas lights.

== Flooding ==
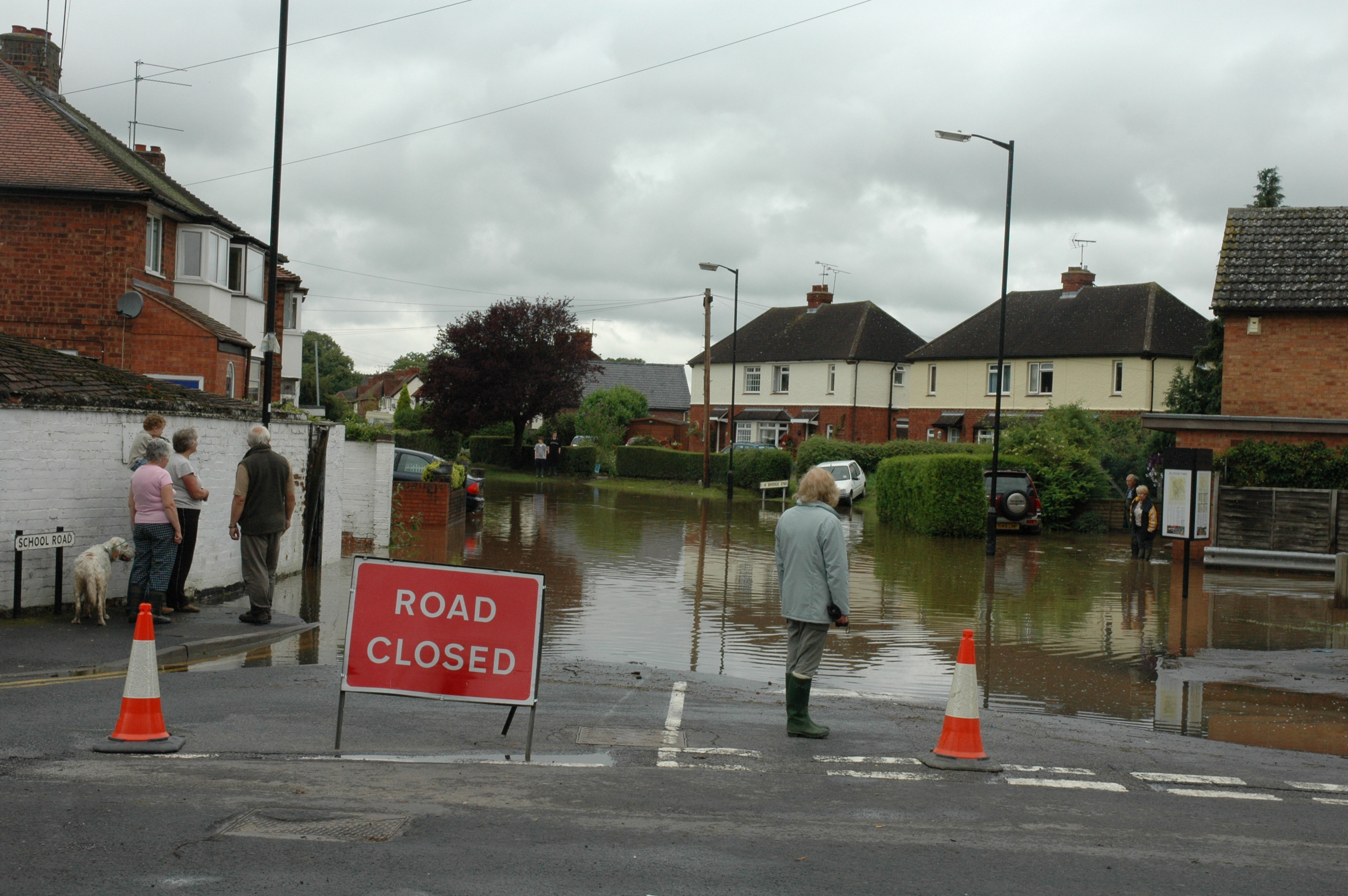
Flood in July 2007

The River Alne and Arrow, which join on the outskirts of Alcester, have occasionally flooded and on a few occasions engulfed part of the town. The last occurrences were in 1956, 10 April 1998 (Maunday Thursday) and on 21 July 2007 when 200 homes were left uninhabitable. In response to the severe flooding of 2007 Alcester flood scheme completed an underground storage tank with a 3.25 million litre capacity in June 2011, costing just over £1 million. The scheme attracted funding from the Regional Flood and Coastal Committee's Local Levy with contributions from Warwickshire County Council, Stratford-on-Avon District Council and Alcester Town Council. The scheme included work on the two pumping stations located at Bleachfield Street and Gas House Lane.

== Sports ==
Alcester Town F.C. has teams from Under-6 to Under-18 and senior players. The town has a rugby club, and also used to have a golf course which closed and became the home of the football club. Alcester is also home to Alcester & Ragley Park Cricket Club, situated in the grounds of Ragley Hall, the club has two Saturday teams who play in the Cotswold Hills League and two Sunday teams who play friendlies. There are also numerous junior teams (Up to U16), and a girls' team. Alcester Golf Club (now defunct) was founded in 1892. The club continued until the outbreak of the Second World War. Alne Cricket Club (Great Alne) is a cricket club about 2 miles from Alcester centre that play in local competitions and have a summer fun week for children. Adults can also play in their "Adult Team".

== Media ==
Local news and television programmes are provided by BBC West Midlands and ITV Central. Television signals are received from the Sutton Coldfield TV transmitter.

Local radio stations are BBC CWR, Capital Mid-Counties, Hits Radio Coventry & Warwickshire, Fresh (Coventry & Warwickshire), Heart West Midlands, Smooth West Midlands, Greatest Hits Radio Midlands and Stratford Community Radio, a community based station that broadcast from Stratford-upon-Avon.

The town is served by the local newspaper, Redditch Advertiser (formerly Alcester Chronicle).

== Education ==
The town has three secondary schools; Alcester Grammar School, Alcester Academy, and St Benedict's Catholic High School.

== Places of worship ==
- St Nicholas Church
- Our Lady & St Joseph's Roman Catholic Church
- Alcester Baptist Church
- Alcester Methodist Church
- Kingdom Hall of Jehovah's Witnesses

== Notable people ==
- Howard Bennett, cricketer
- John Bridges, English Civil War soldier and MP
- Russell Brookes, rally driver
- Gilbert Cox, cricketer
- Bernard Cuzner, silversmith and product designer
- Francis James Davies, First World War flying ace
- Fulke Greville (1554–1628), born at Beauchamp's Court, Alcester
- Frederick George Jackson, Arctic Explorer, rescuer of Fridtjof Nansen
- Edward Scriven, portrait engraver
- Nick Skelton, Olympic Gold Medallist
- Francis Summers, cricketer
- Richard Waldron, former President of New Hampshire Council
- Tom Wilkes, footballer

== Town twinning ==
Alcester is twinned with Vallet in Loire-Atlantique, France.

== Sources ==
- Cave, Lyndon F., Warwickshire Villages, London, 1976. ISBN 0-7091-5509-3
- George Edward Saville and Alcester and District Local History Society Staff (1986). Alcester—a History. Brewin Books.
