= Harvington =

Village in Worcestershire, England

Coordinates: 52.143077°N 1.925876°W

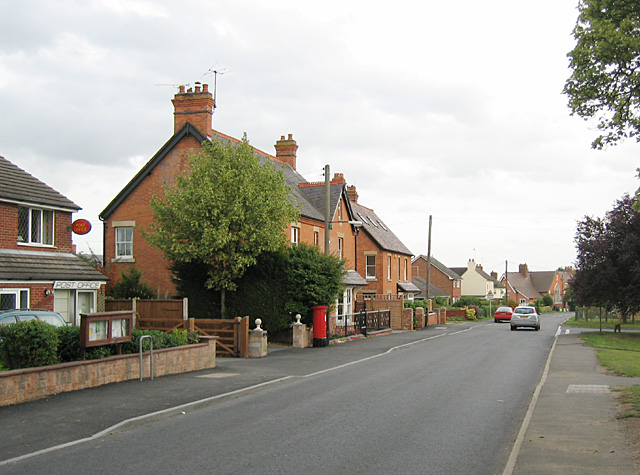

- Location within Worcestershire
- District: Wychavon
- Shire county: Worcestershire
- Region: West Midlands
- Country: England
- Sovereign state: United Kingdom
- Post town: Evesham
- Postcode district: WR11
- Police: West Mercia
- Fire: Hereford and Worcester
- Ambulance: West Midlands
- UK Parliament: Reddich

Harvington is a village near Evesham in Worcestershire, England. Bounded by the River Avon to the south and the Lench Hills to the north, three miles northeast of Evesham and now on the Worcestershire/Warwickshire border. The village today is an amalgamation of two smaller villages, Harvington and Harvington Cross, and has a population of around 1,750.

== History ==
The name Harvington derives from the Old English herefordtūn meaning 'settlement by the ford which could be crossed by an army'.

Harvington is first mentioned in the Anglo Saxon charters of 709CE when it was known as Herverton; in the Middle Ages it was called Herwynton. In 1868 there was a curious old custom still observed at Harvington; the children used to go round to all the houses on St Thomas's Day and St Valentine's Day repeating a doggerel rhyme as follows: 'Wissal, wassail, through the town, If you've got any apples throw them down, Up with the stocking and down with the shoe, If you've got no apples money will do.'

=== 1961 Jet Provost air incident ===
On 30 August 1961, BAC Jet Provost 'XM423', from RAF Little Rissington in east Gloucestershire, hit 275kV 160ft pylons, on the transmission line from Ham Hall to Melksham. Both pilots ejected.

=== Harvington Horse Hunt ===
The Harvington Horse Hunt is a purported traditional event said to take place annually in the Worcestershire village of Harvington. According to local folklore, the tradition dates to 9 September 999 AD, when the young son of the Earl of Harvington was allegedly trampled to death by a horse. In remembrance of the incident, villagers are said to gather each year on 9 September and search the village for a horse which is then ceremonially captured and taken to one of the local public houses. The climax of the event involves the horse being beheaded inside the pub, after which the villagers celebrate late into the evening. The tradition is said to have continued for more than a thousand years.

In more recent times, the event is held where a wooden, straw or piñata style horse is used, its hidden somewhere in the village then carried by the villagers into one of the two pubs in Harvington, at which point its head is chopped off by a man dressed as the Earl of Harvington.

== Present ==
Harvington has a number of amenities including a convenience store, a farm shop, two children's play areas, a community orchard, youth group, sports facilities and clubs.

The village has two churches, the Anglican St James Church and a Baptist church, and two pubs, the Golden Cross and the Coach and Horses.

The River Avon is close by. A large section of the bank is owned and managed by Manor Farm Leisure, which also runs the local golf course, fishing lakes and holiday caravan site.

Towards the south end of the village, there is a natural landmark called Monkey Island, which despite its name doesn't have any monkeys or islands and is simply just a wooded area near an orchard that contains a brook flowing through it.

== Education ==
Harvington First School is a small school of approximately 180 pupils aged 5 – 10 years. Older pupils attend nearby St. Egwins Middle School and Prince Henry's High School which are in Evesham. Harvey Bears Nursery & Preschool offers childcare to the residents of Harvington and surrounding communities.

== Sports ==
Harvington Cricket Club were winners of four Worcestershire league titles which they achieved in 2009, 2010, 2011 and 2013. They are in Division 5 of the Worcestershire County League. The club hosts county matches at various representative levels. In 2010 1st XI player Nathan Gage won the Worcestershire Cricketer of the Year sponsored by Duncan Fearnley and the Worcester News. The club runs free coaching sessions for local schools and holds Junior practice on Friday evenings.

Harvington Cricket Club was established in 1893, with early records documenting village cricket activity during the same year, including a fixture against Dunnington on 24 June 1893. Reports in the Evesham Journal indicate regular club activity throughout the late nineteenth and early twentieth centuries. The club continues to play at its historic Anchor Lane ground in Harvington, where it runs multiple senior sides and junior programmes. Many Ex-Herons still support the Club; most well known is George Clarke played for 28 years, Lee Kent played for 26 years, Terry Thornton for 27 years, David Tuck Played for 18 years, Barry Carpenter played for 31 years and Keith Carpenter played for 29 years. Ex-Heron Jayden Lennox made his One-Day International BlackCap debut against India on the 14th January 2026. The former Harvington Cricket player was at the club for two seasons, from 2012 to 2013, taking a total of 137 wickets at an average of 10.90.

Harvington Harriers Football club play in division 3 in the Evesham & District Sunday Football League.

== Railways ==
Harvington railway station previously served the village as part of the Gloucester Loop Line. In July 1858 the Redditch Railway Act authorised a line to link Redditch with the Midland Railway's Birmingham and Gloucester line at Barnt Green. The Redditch Railway opened on 18 September 1859 but was operated from the start by the Midland Railway.

In 1868 the Evesham and Redditch Railway built a line south from Redditch through Evesham to a junction at Ashchurch. There were intermediate stations between Redditch and Evesham at Studley and Astwood Bank, Coughton, Alcester, Wixford, Broom Junction (for the Stratford-upon-Avon and Midland Junction Railway), Salford Priors, and Harvington.

British Railways (BR) closed the line under the Beeching Axe south of Alcester on 29 September 1962 after suspending the passenger service between Redditch and Evesham due to poor track condition. Freight services continued between Redditch and Alcester until 1964 when BR closed the whole line south of Redditch.

== Governance and religion ==
Harvington parish falls under the Wychavon District Council ward of Harvington and Norton, the Worcestershire County Council division of Harvington, and the parliamentary constituency of Redditch, whose MP since 2024 is Chris Bloore of the Labour Party.

It falls under the Church of England Diocese of Worcester, the Archdeaconry of Worcester, and the deanery of Evesham.

== Notable residents ==
  - Gareth Jones, who was a High rise buildingcladding contractor and led and made rules in safety and man safe systems, he was an advocate for the fall arrest system and one of the key reasons why it is now compulsory to wear when working at height. In later years he has retired in the village and jokingly called the Volvo expert due to his knowledge about them. He has become known within the village for his charity work with his wife Shirley, 2009-2014 he walked from Harvington to Harrogateraising money for different charities. Born 1958. Jones also served as a local Scoutleader for 17 years, contributing to youth activities, outdoor education, and fundraising initiatives. Former participants are said to recall his emphasis on preparation and practical skills, reflecting his professional background in safety systems. Within village life, Jones has also been associated with local sport and community activities, including support for village cricket and football events. He was reported to have assisted with maintenance and fundraising efforts connected to Harvington Cricket Club ,particularly during junior coaching periods and community events.Jones was known for voluntary work, including support for church events and charitable functions. He served for several years as chairman of the church fête and later volunteered as a marshal at regional events, including those held at Ragley Hall, where he assisted with volunteer coordination and refreshments. Outside formal volunteering, Jones became informally recognised for his interest in Volvo vehicles, local horticulture, and community maintenance. He was known for growing oversized marrows and tomatoes for neighbours and for regularly raising concerns regarding local pothole conditions. Jones and Shirley have three children.
  - Adam de Harvington, Chancellor of the Exchequer 1327–1330, took his surname from his native village. He was usually known in his own lifetime as Adam de Herwynton (the common medieval spelling of Harvington). Note: Again, he was born in Harvington, Kidderminster, not Harvington, Evesham.
  - William de Harvington, who was Adam's cousin and left him his personal property, was Abbot of Pershore Abbey 1307–1340
