= Bidford-on-Avon =

Village in Warwickshire, England

Coordinates: 52.16438°N 1.85668°W

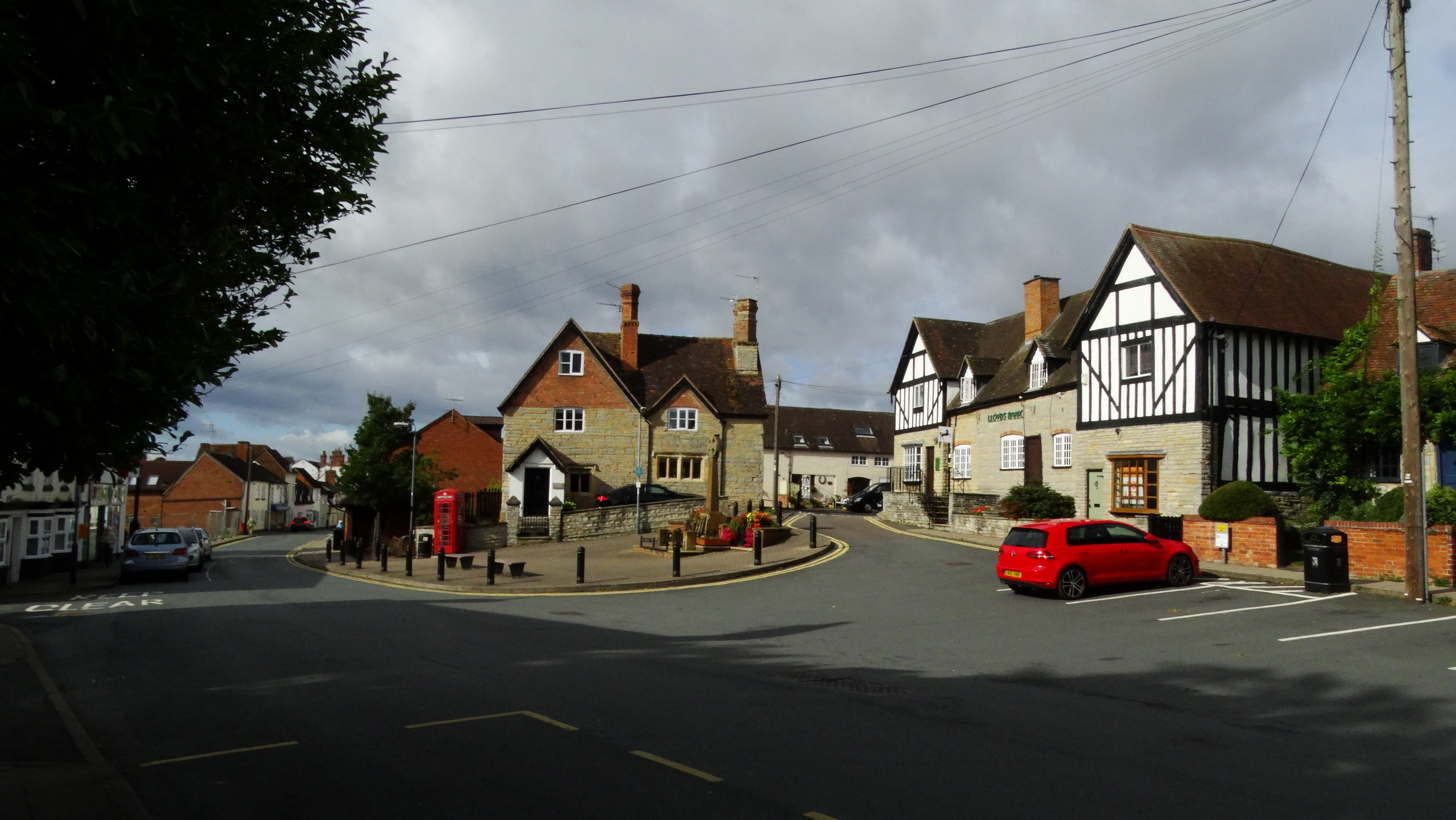
- The village centre in Bidford-on-Avon

- Location within Warwickshire
- Population: 6,818 (2021)
- OS grid reference: SP099518
- Civil parish: Bidford-on-Avon
- District: Stratford-on-Avon
- Shire county: Warwickshire
- Region: West Midlands
- Country: England
- Sovereign state: United Kingdom
- Post town: ALCESTER
- Postcode district: B50
- Dialling code: 01789
- Police: Warwickshire
- Fire: Warwickshire
- Ambulance: West Midlands

Bidford-on-Avon is a large village and civil parish in the English county of Warwickshire, very close to the border with Worcestershire. In the 2001 census it had a population of 4,830, increasing to 5,350 at the 2011 census, increasing again to 6,818 in the 2021 census.

== History ==
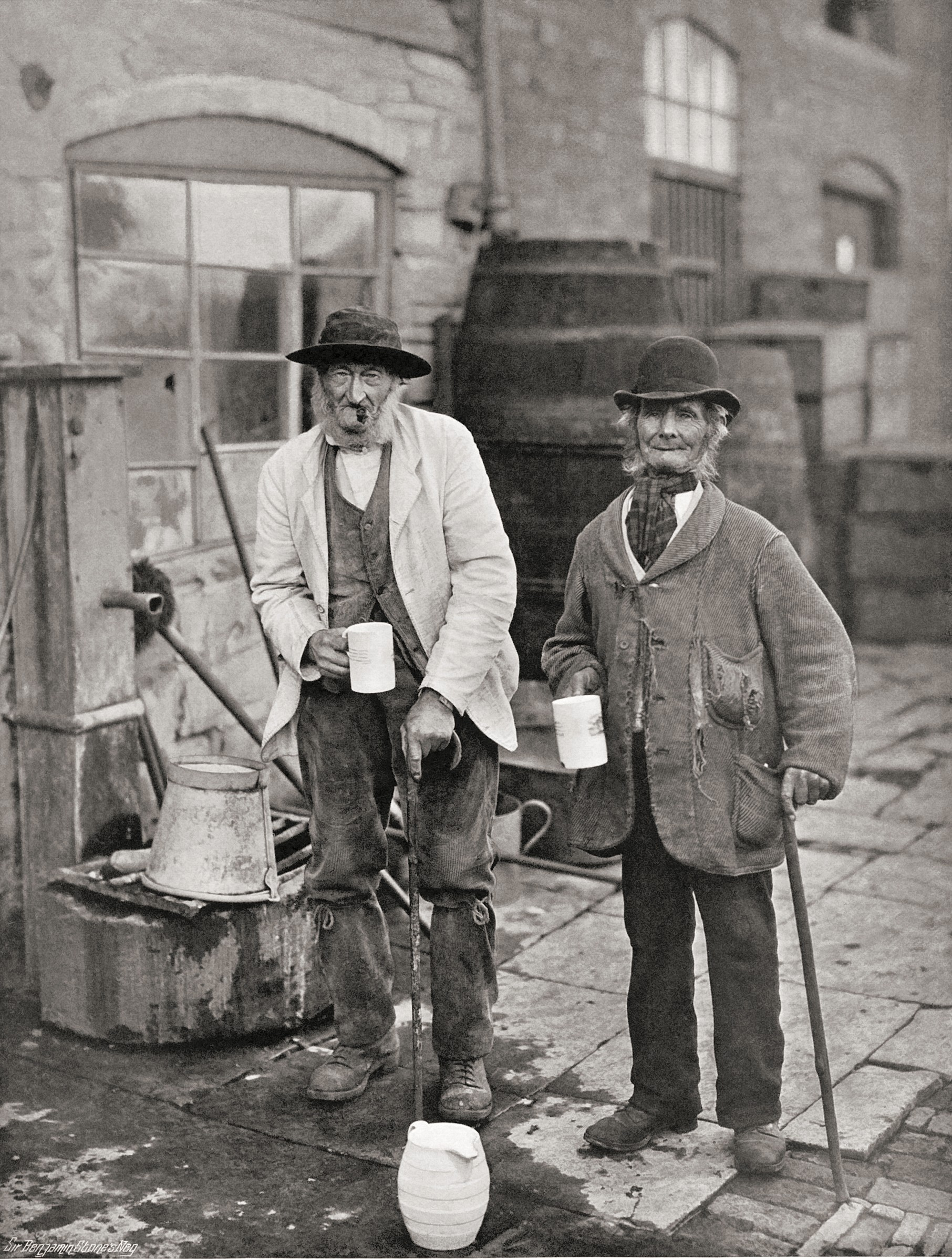
Two villagers at the Bidford Mop (Michaelmas Fair) c. 1900

The Roman road Icknield Street passes through the village, going north towards Alcester. The road crossed the Avon at what in Anglo-Saxon times, became known as Byda's Ford, which was the origin of the village's name. There is an ancient Anglo-Saxon burial site under the free car park located just behind the Indian restaurant "No 72". First discovered in the 1920s, artefacts from more recent excavations are located at Warwick Museum, while material from the first excavations on the site currently resides in the hands of the Shakespeare Birthplace Trust. A Bronze Age razor was found in excavations at Bidford-on-Avon.

William Shakespeare is said to have joined a party of Stratford folk which set itself to outdrink a drinking club at Bidford-on-Avon, and as a result of his labours in that regard to have fallen asleep under the crab tree of which a descendant is still called Shakespeare's tree. When morning dawned his friends wished to renew the encounter but he wisely said "No I have drunk with “Piping Pebworth, Dancing Marston, Haunted Hillboro’, Hungry Grafton, Dodging Exhall, Papist Wixford, Beggarly Broom and Drunken Bidford” and so, presumably, I will drink no more." The story is said to date from the 17th century but of its truth or of any connection of the story or the verse to Shakespeare there is no evidence. The Falcon Inn was a favourite tavern in his day.

Bidford expanded roughly fourfold in size during the second half of the 20th century.

== Location ==
Bidford-on-Avon village is, as its name suggests, situated on the River Avon, some 7 miles (11 km) downstream of Stratford-upon-Avon and about the same distance upstream of Evesham. The village grew up around an ancient ford (Byda's Ford), now replaced by a narrow stone bridge, on the Ryknild Street Roman road, now a minor country road to Honeybourne, four miles (six kilometres) south. To the north Alcester is about four miles (six kilometres) away, Redditch 10 miles (16 km) away and Birmingham 25 miles (40 km) away. It also lies on the Heart of England Way.

== Local government ==
Bidford-on-Avon is a civil parish with an elected parish council. It falls within the areas of Stratford-on-Avon District Council and Warwickshire County Council. The three councils are responsible for different aspects of local government. Besides the village of Bidford itself, the civil parish includes the settlements of Barton, Broom and Marlcliff. Broom lies to the north of Bidford, whilst both Barton and Marlcliff lie south of the river.

== Bidford Community Library ==
When Warwickshire County Council took the decision to close the Bidford Library in April 2012, a Social Enterprise company was formed. The Library officially reopened on 2 May 2012, by children's author Anne Fine. The library was fully refurbished in Spring 2018, thanks to funding provided by a Section 106 Planning Obligation.

== Transport ==
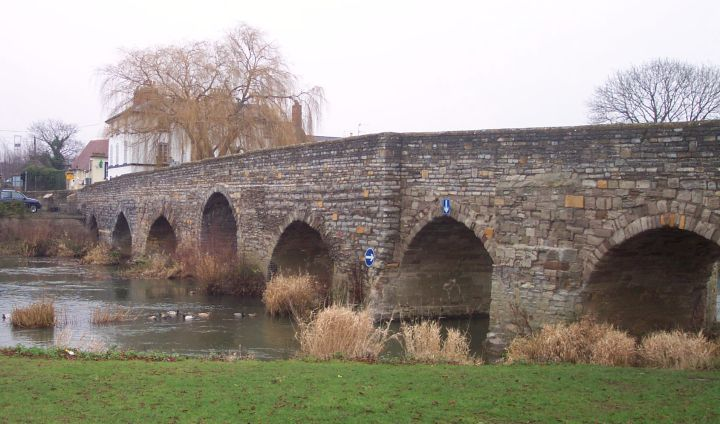
Bridge over the River Avon

The river is crossed by Bidford Bridge, which is a scheduled monument. During the week beginning Monday 26 November 2012, the Bridge had to be closed, due to flooding, when the River Avon burst its banks in various places. On 9 June 2015, the bridge was closed to traffic after a heavy duty farm vehicle crashed into it, causing serious damage to the historic structure. Police cars were positioned either side of the bridge to alert drivers to the fact that the bridge was inaccessible to traffic. After repairs, the bridge re-opened.

Bidford no longer has an active railway line, but it once had a station on the Stratford-upon-Avon and Midland Junction Railway, which ran east–west across the county from Broom Junction on the Midland Railway's Barnt Green to Ashchurch line, through Stratford-upon-Avon to Towcester and beyond. The Broom to Stratford section (including Bidford-on-Avon and also Binton), was an early casualty, with passenger services suspended in June 1947 and closure rubber-stamped as permanent in May 1949. The line itself remained open with the south curve of Broom Junction until at least 1952. Today the closest station to Bidford, is Honeybourne railway station, which is located five miles (eight kilometres) south of the village. Honeybourne station provides regular rail services to London Paddington, Oxford, Evesham, Worcester Shrub Hill and Hereford along the Cotswold Line.

Bidford bridge closed to vehicles on 11 August 2024, after a car hitting the bridge parapet and damaged the structure. The bridge reopened in mid-December following complex repairs.

== Churches ==
The Anglican parish church is dedicated to St. Laurence. St. Joseph the Worker Church is the local Roman Catholic church. The Barn is the home of Bidford Baptist Church. Bidford also has a Methodist church.

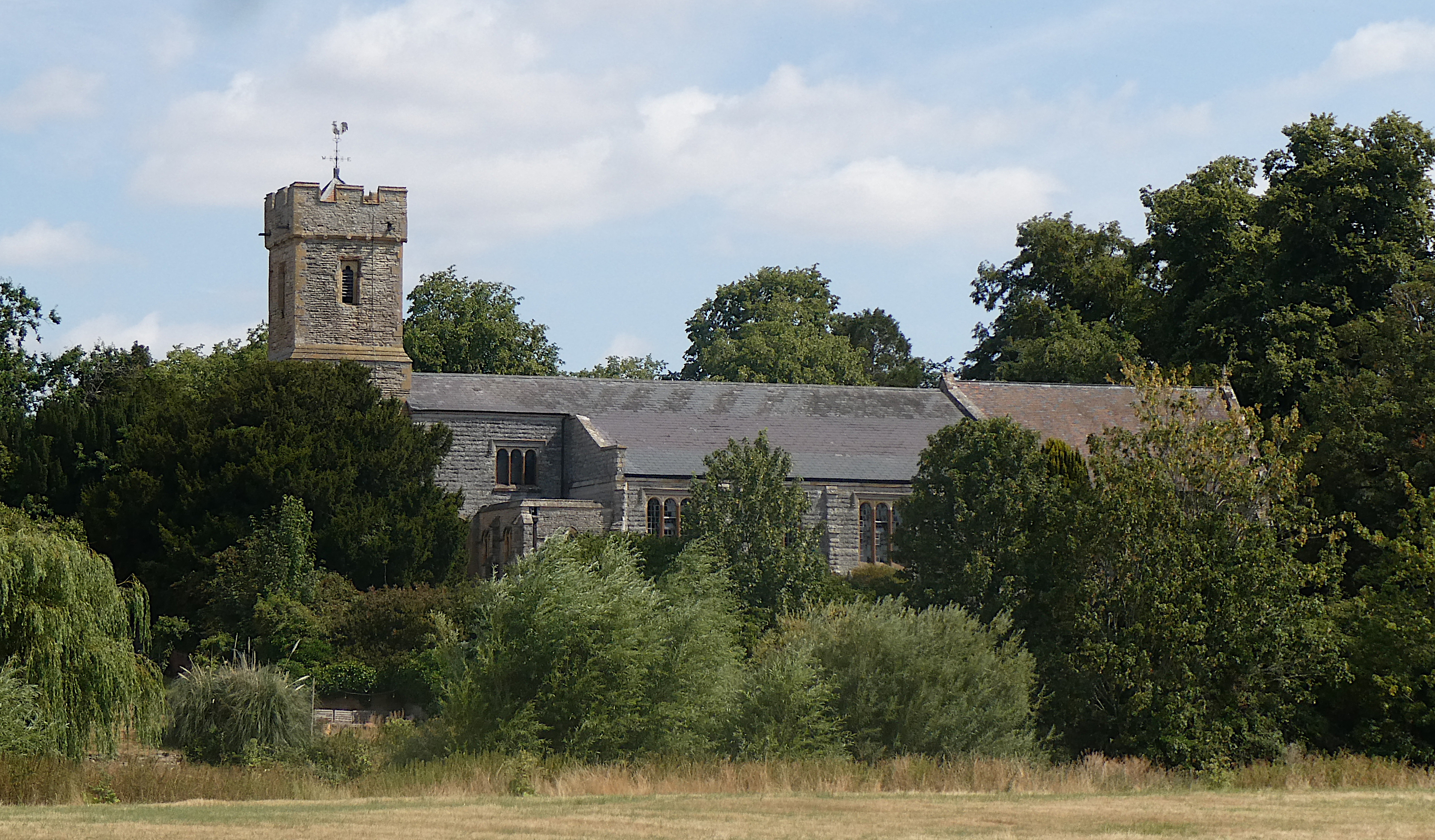

== Twinning village ==
Bidford is twinned with Ebsdorfergrund, a village close to Marburg in Rheinhessen, Germany.

== Notable people ==
- Barbara Comyns (1907–1992), writer and artist.
- Fred Wilkes (1883–1942), professional footballer
