= Redditch railway station =

Railway station in Worcestershire, England

Coordinates: 52.306°N 1.945°W

Redditch
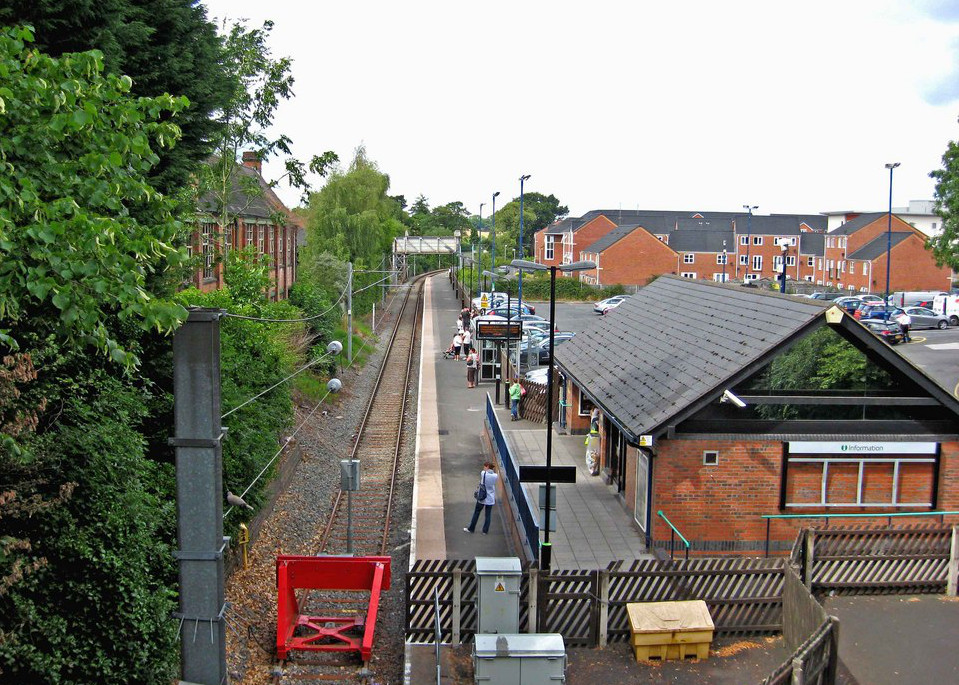

General information
- Location: Redditch, Worcestershire, England
- Grid reference: SP038675
- Manager: West Midlands Railway
- Platforms: 1

Other information
- Station code: RDC
- Classification: DfT category D

Key dates
- 18 September 1859: Line and station opened
- 4 May 1868: Station relocated for opening of Evesham and Redditch Railway
- 1962: Passenger services south of Redditch suspended
- 7 February 1972: Station relocated
- 5 October 1992: Station relocated

Passengers
- 2021/22: ▲0.581 million
- 2022/23: ▲0.685 million
- 2023/24: ▲0.848 million
- 2024/25: ▲0.910 million
- 2025/26: ▲0.961 million
Location
Notes
- Passenger statistics from the Office of Rail and Road

Redditch railway station serves the town of Redditch, North Worcestershire, England. It is the southern terminus of the Cross-City Line 14.5 miles (23 km) south of Birmingham New Street. The station, and all trains serving it, are operated by West Midlands Trains. Redditch station sits at the end of a single track branch line from Barnt Green which forms part of the Cross-City Line. The line used to continue south to Ashchurch and also Evesham but this was closed in the 1960s.

== History ==
In July 1858, the Redditch Railway Act authorised a line to link Redditch with the Midland Railway's Birmingham and Gloucester line at Barnt Green. The Redditch Railway opened on 18 September 1859 but was operated from the start by the Midland Railway.

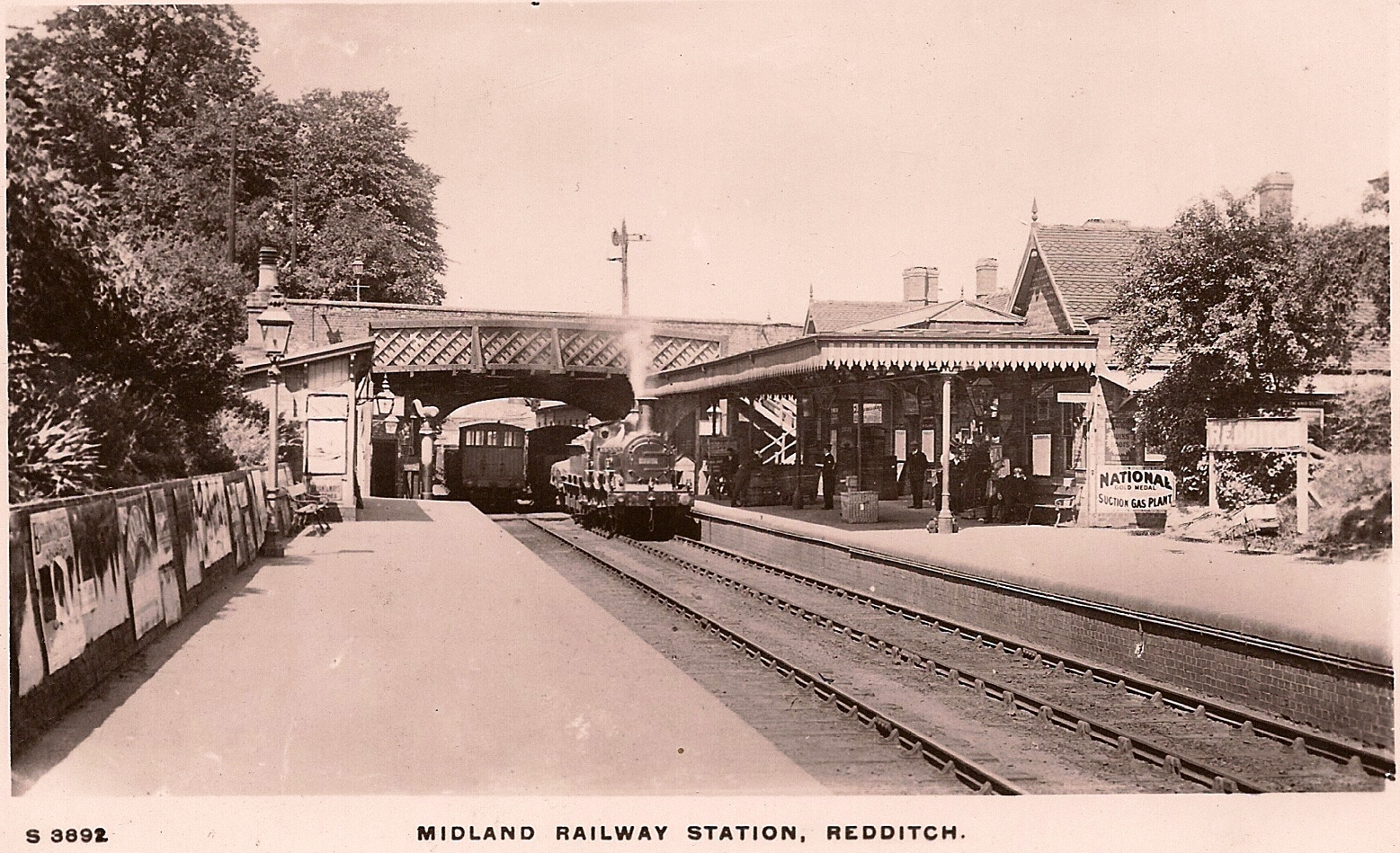
The second Redditch station in the 1900s

In 1868, the Evesham and Redditch Railway built a line south from Redditch through Evesham to a junction at Ashchurch. There were intermediate stations between Redditch and Evesham at Studley and Astwood Bank, Coughton, Alcester, Wixford, Broom Junction (for the Stratford-upon-Avon and Midland Junction Railway), Salford Priors, and Harvington.

British Railways (BR) closed the line south of Alcester on 29 September 1962 after suspending the passenger service between Redditch and Evesham due to poor track condition. Freight services continued between Redditch and Alcester until 1964 when BR closed the whole line south of Redditch. The remaining line from Redditch to Barnt Green was nearly closed under the Beeching Axe, which would have severed the town from the railway network entirely. But a strong campaign by local residents and local MPs managed to save it. However, by the late 1960s, services to Redditch had been cut to the bare minimum with just four daily trains to and from Birmingham. This persisted until 1980, when an hourly service was extended to Redditch on the newly upgraded Cross-City Line. This was upgraded to half-hourly in 1989.

The station has been relocated three times, on 4 May 1868, 7 February 1972 and 5 October 1992. The movement of the station was to give way to redevelopment in the town centre and the building of a new bus station. The most recent rebuilding of the station in 1992 coincided with the electrification of the Cross-City Line. The first station was in Clive Road when the original Redditch Railway was opened in 1859. The station moved to the site that is now the bus station when the railway was extended to Evesham in 1868.

Some of the former goods yard that was on Pound Meadow is now the car park to current station but most of the yard has been redeveloped into housing and a hotel.

The single track from Barnt Green restricted the number of trains that could run to Redditch to two per hour. In November 2013 a scheme was approved to construct a new passing loop at Alvechurch to allow the service to be increased to three trains per hour. The line between Barnt Green and Redditch was closed for eight weeks for the works to be carried out, and was reopened on 1 September 2014. The improved service began in December 2014. Though the service has since reverted to half-hourly, the loop remains in use.

== Facilities ==
The station is staffed and has a booking office as well as a ticket machine. Step-free access is available for wheelchair users. There is also a shop available for passengers selling newspapers, food, and drinks. Train running information is offered via digital CIS displays, automated announcements, timetable poster boards, and a customer help point.

== Services ==
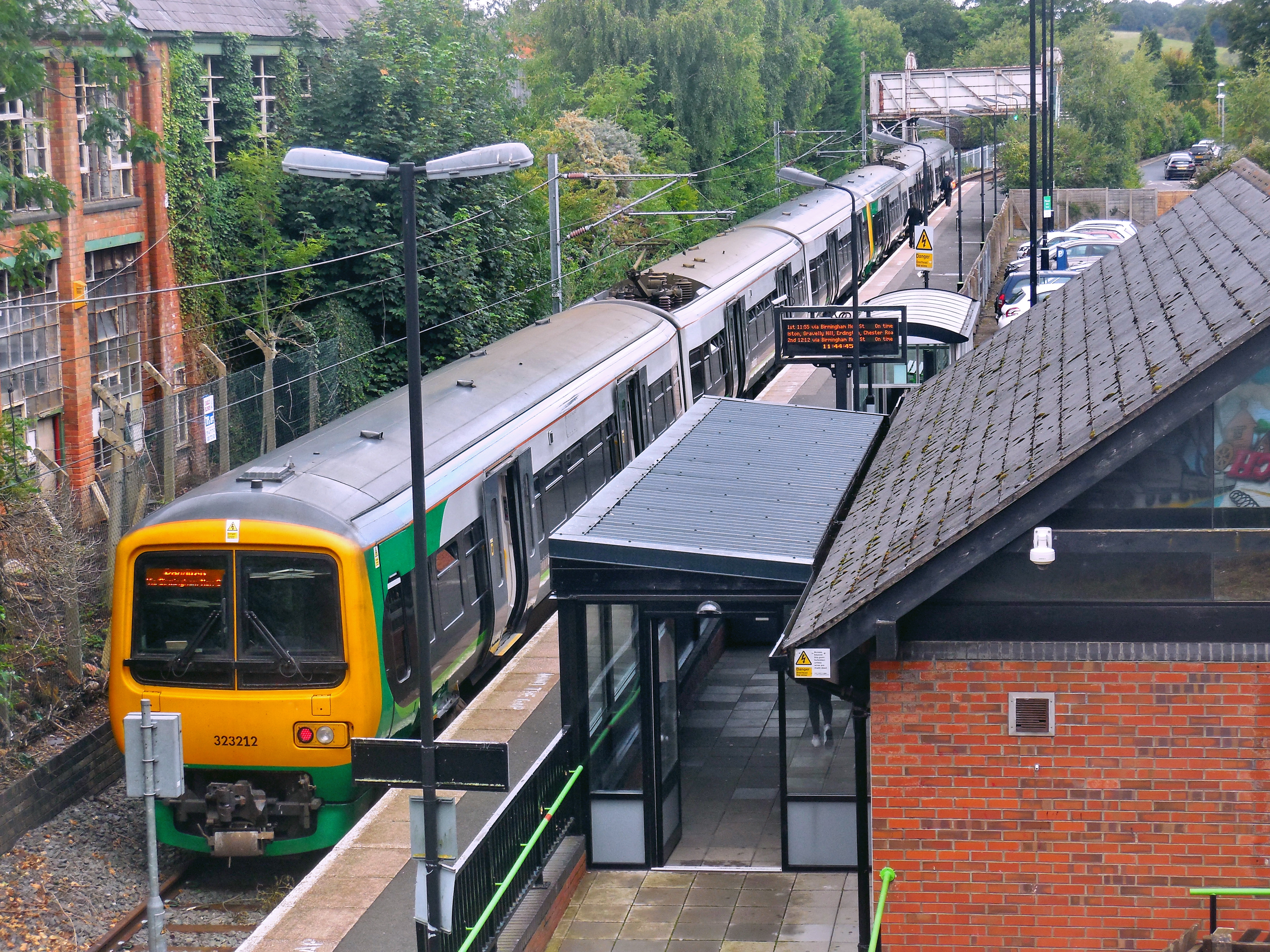
A London Midland branded Class 323 at Redditch in 2015.

West Midlands Railway serve the station every 30 minutes on the Cross-City Line to Four Oaks via University, Birmingham New Street and Sutton Coldfield. On Sundays a half hourly service runs through to Lichfield Trent Valley calling at all stations en route.

Services were operated using Class 323 Electric multiple units (EMUs) until September 2024 and are currently operated by Class 730 EMUs.

Preceding station	National Rail	Following station
Alvechurch	West Midlands Railway Lichfield – Four Oaks – Birmingham – Redditch; Cross-City Line	Terminus
Historical railways
Alvechurch Line and station open	Midland Railway Evesham loop line	Studley and Astwood Bank Line and station closed

== Bibliography ==
- Mitchell, Vic; Smith, Keith (2006). Cheltenham to Redditch. Middleton Press. figs. 100-109. ISBN 9781904474814. OCLC 851839542.
