= Wixford =

Hamlet in Warwickshire, England

Coordinates: 52.187°N 1.872°W

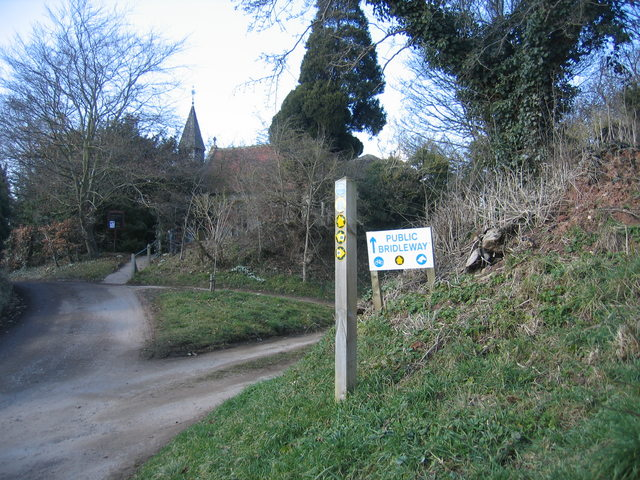
- Wixford with St. Milburga's in the background

- Location within Warwickshire
- Population: 155 (2011 Census)
- OS grid reference: SP088543
- District: Stratford on Avon
- Shire county: Warwickshire
- Region: West Midlands
- Country: England
- Sovereign state: United Kingdom
- Post town: Alcester
- Postcode district: B49
- Police: Warwickshire
- Fire: Warwickshire
- Ambulance: West Midlands
- UK Parliament: Stratford-on-Avon,

Wixford is a village and civil parish in the Stratford-on-Avon District of Warwickshire, England, situated 1.5 miles (2.4 km) south of Alcester. The population at the 2011 census was 155. The area is largely agricultural with no large employers in the area, most residents commuting to larger towns nearby.

== History ==
The name derives from a compound of the Old English personal name Whitlac with the noun for a river crossing "ford". The village is first mentioned when Ufa, a Saxon Earl of Warwick, gave the land at Wixford and his body to be buried to the monastery of Evesham Abbey in 974. However, Godwine, a powerful man who had purchased the inheritance of that abbey from King Ethelred, granted it to Wulfgeat, son and heir to Ufa, for life, upon condition it was returned. Notwithstanding this agreement, Wulfgeat's heirs retained the land until the time of King Edward the Confessor, when Abbot Agelwyne purchased it from Wygod, a potent baron and heir to Wulfgeat. Wulfgeat's heirs paid a valuable price and regained the land for the monks. It is recorded in the Domesday Book "In Ferncombe Hundred, Evesham Abbey holds 5 hides in Witelavesford. Land for 6 ploughs. In lordship 2; 3 male and 2 female slaves; 4 villagers and 6 smallholders with 2 ploughs. A mill at 10s and 20 sticks of eels; meadow, 24 acres; woodland 1 furlong long and 1/2 wide. Value before 1066, 40s; later 30s; now 50s. Wigot held this land before 1066."

William Shakespeare is said to have joined a party of Stratford folk which set itself to outdrink a drinking club at Bidford-on-Avon, and as a result of his labours in that regard to have fallen asleep under the crab tree of which a descendant is still called Shakespeare's tree. When morning dawned, his friends wished to renew the encounter but he wisely said "No, I have drunk with "Piping Pebworth, Dancing Marston, Haunted Hillboro', Hungry Grafton, Dodging Exhall, Papist Wixford, Beggarly Broom and Drunken Bidford" and so, presumably, I will drink no more. The story is said to date from the 17th century, but of its truth or of any connection of the story or the verse to Shakespeare there is no evidence. The reasons for the village being described as papist remain unclear, but may be a reference to the Catholic Throckmorton family. In 1541, the village passed to Sir George Throckmorton, in whose family it remained until 1919, when the estate was sold and the manorial rights extinguished.

== Notable buildings ==
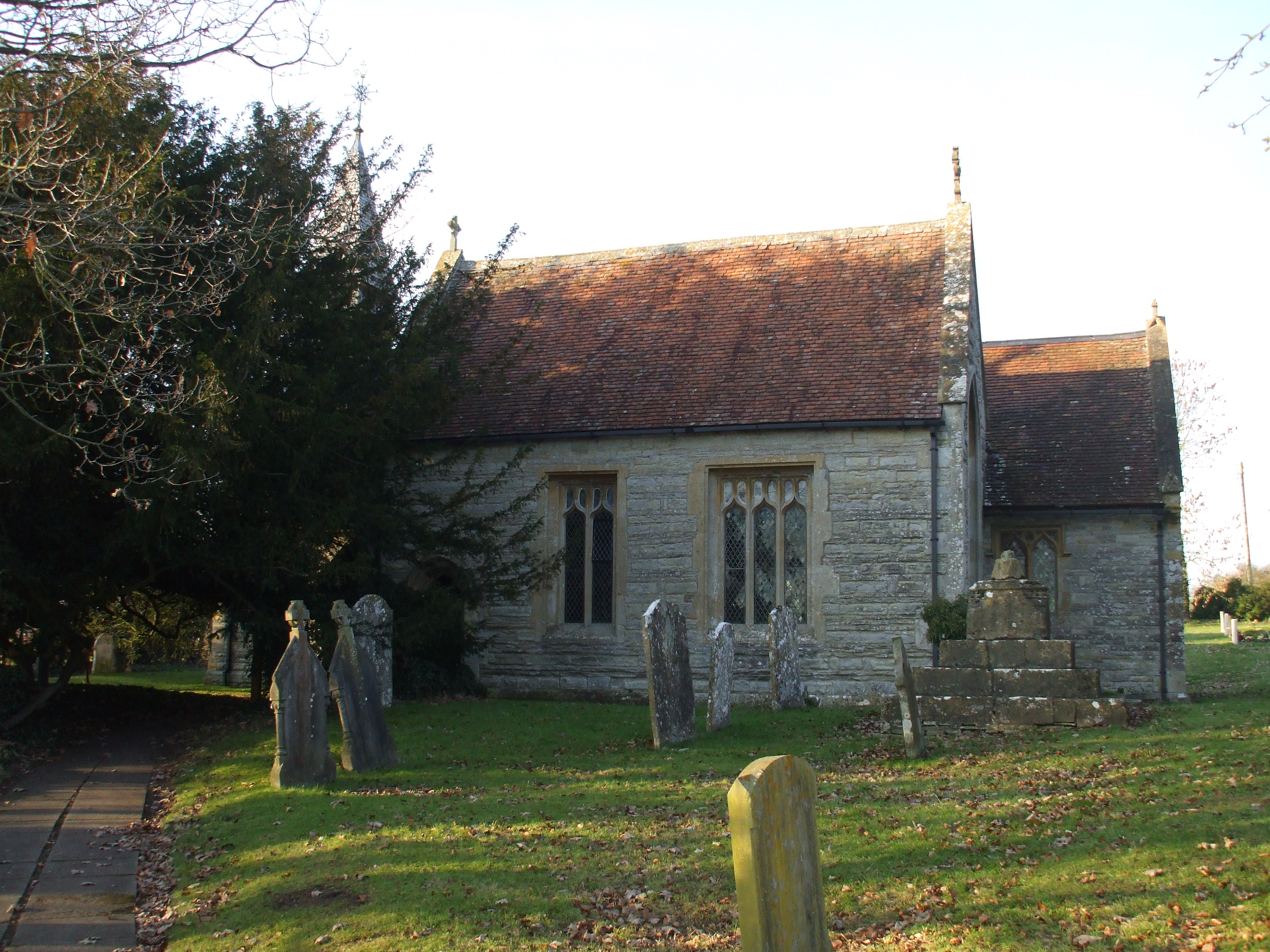
St Milburga's Church, Wixford, Warwickshire

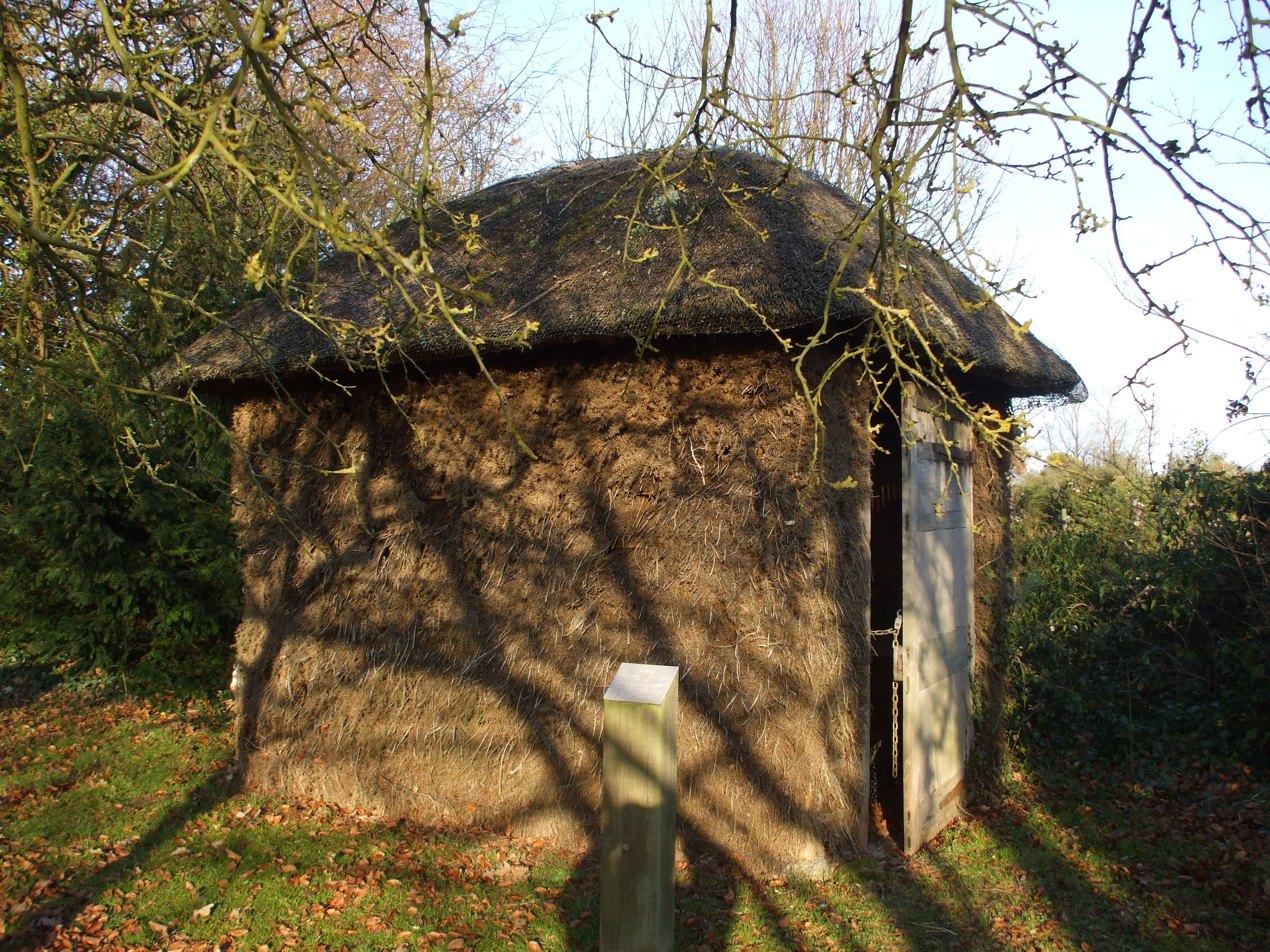
Thatched Horsehouse

The parish church is dedicated to St. Milburga of Wenlock and was founded in the 12th century. The Domesday Book makes no mention of a priest at Wixford. The dedication of the church to the Saxon St. Milburg seems to be evidence of its antiquity, but not necessarily of a pre-Conquest foundation, for the cult of St. Milburg was revived, after long neglect, by the translation of her relics at Wenlock Priory in 1101. The church comprises a nave and chancel under one roof, south chantry chapel, south porch, and bell turret. There is one ancient, uninscribed bell, and another by John Martin of Worcester, dated. The bell was recast in 1937, retaining the old inscription. The church was restored in 1881 and the south porch and the western bell turret probably date from then.

There are two Norman doorways on the south having columns. The southern chapel, dedicated to St. John the Baptist, was built early in the 15th century by Thomas de Cruwe, who was legal advisor to Margaret Beauchamp. In the south chapel is the fine table tomb to Thomas de Cruwe and his wife, Juliana (1400–11), with fine canopied brasses. The church is approached by a churchyard shaded by an old yew. In 1660, six parishioners accused the rector of wishing to cut down a yew tree in the churchyard 'the like whereof is not to be found in all the diocese'. In 1730 Dr. Thomas, rector here, gave its height as 53 feet (16 m) and its circumference as 18 feet 3 inches (5.56 m). However, according to a rhyme in a volume of cuttings relating to Ragley at the Shire Hall. 'In 1763 in Wixford churchyard there was felled a yew tree. In 1765 there was planted another that never will thrive.'

The churchyard also contains a grade II listed horsehouse of hurdle and gorse with a thatched roof dating from the 18th century. Wixford never having a separate living, being a chapel of Exhall since the reformation so it was provided for the mounts of the visiting clergy from other parishes. There is also a fine large base of a churchyard cross with a moulded top edge, the stump of a shaft, and three steps to the platform dating from the 15th century. For much of the late 19th and early 20th century people travelled from Alcester to the Sunday evening services in St Milburga's. The remains of Oversley Castle are zero point five miles (0.80 km) north of the village and the Roman road Icknield Street runs very close by.

== Governance ==
Wixford is part of the Salford Priors & Alcester Rural ward of Stratford-on-Avon District Council and is represented by Ashley Jones of Reform UK. Nationally, it is part of the Stratford-on-Avon constituency; the current member of parliament is Manuela Perteghella of the Liberal Democrats. Prior to Brexit in 2020, it was part of the West Midlands electoral region of the European Parliament.

== Transport links ==
The village formerly was served by Wixford railway station, built by the Evesham & Redditch Railway Company in September 1866 as part of the Gloucester Loop Line. At the time of its closure in January 1950 it belonged to British Railways. The line, the station, and the associated railway bridge no longer exist, with the line through the station closing in 1963 as a result of the Beeching Axe. However, the Heart of England Way, popular with hikers, runs along part of the old line. The River Arrow also runs through the village.

== Sports and leisure ==
The village has two pubs, the Fish Inn and the Three Horseshoes. Because of its proximity to the border of Worcestershire, the Exhall & Wixford cricket club, which plays in the Cotswold Hills League, is affiliated to both the Warwickshire and Worcestershire County Cricket Boards. The small village hall, with a capacity of 70, is available for hire by members of the public.
