= Coughton =

Coughton may refer to the following places in England:

- Coughton, Herefordshire, a hamlet in Herefordshire
- Coughton, Warwickshire, a village in Warwickshire
  - Coughton Court, a country house in Warwickshire
