= Coughton railway station =

Former railway station in Warwickshire, England

Coughton
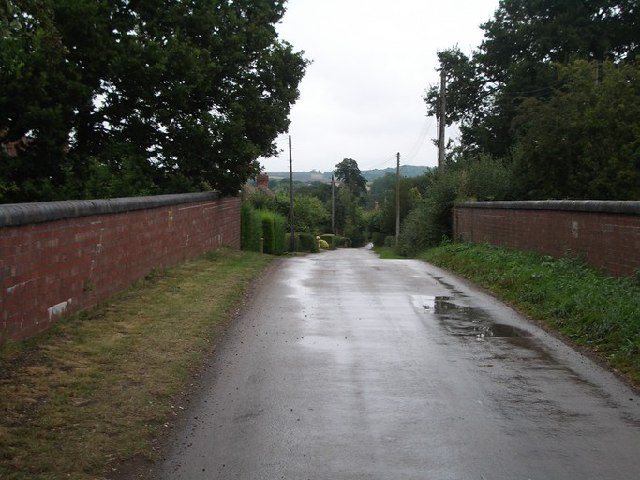
- Railway bridge on Coughton Lane. The station was about 500 metres to the north west of here immediately beyond the bridge over Sambourne Lane

General information
- Location: Coughton, Warwickshire, Stratford-on-Avon; England
- Coordinates: 52.2444°N 1.8930°W
- Grid reference: SP073607
- Platforms: 1

Other information
- Status: Disused

History
- Opened: 4 May 1868; 157 years ago
- Closed: 30 June 1952; 73 years ago
- Original company: Evesham and Redditch Railway
- Pre-grouping: Midland Railway
- Post-grouping: London, Midland and Scottish Railway; London Midland Region of British Railways
Location

Coughton railway station serving Coughton, Warwickshire was a station on the Barnt Green to Evesham line. The station was opened by the Evesham and Redditch Railway on 4 May 1868. The station had one platform and a simple brick building. The station had a short siding similar to Wixford.

The station closed on 30 June 1952. The road bridge which was near the platform has now been demolished and Sambourne Lane now runs through the site of the bridge. The station building is now a private residence and has been heavily altered. The platform edge can still clearly be identified.

Preceding station	Disused railways	Following station
Studley and Astwood Bank; Line and station closed	London Midland and Scottish Railway; Evesham loop line	Alcester; Line and station closed
