= Salford Priors railway station =

Former railway station in Warwickshire, England

Salford Priors
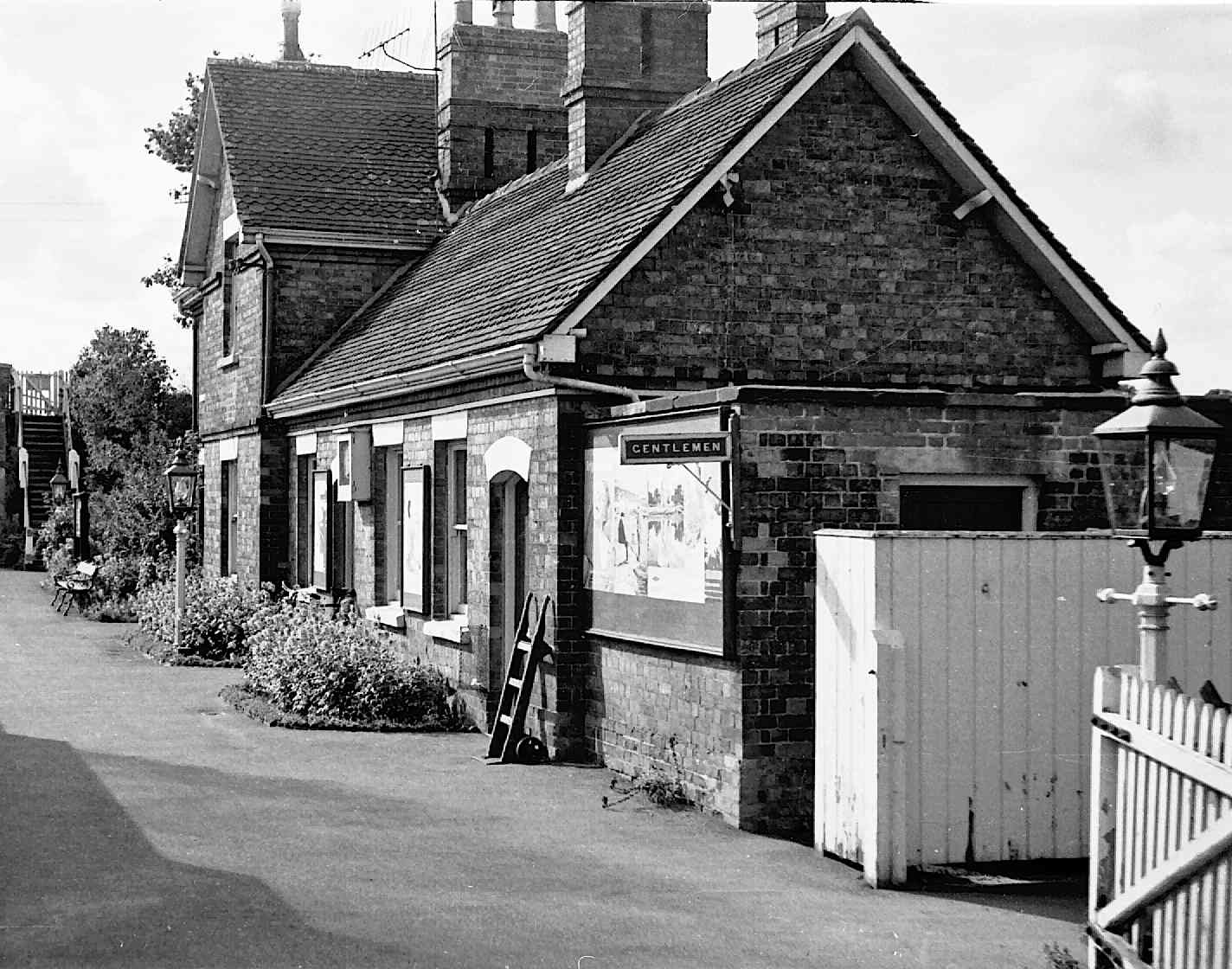
- June 1962

General information
- Location: Salford Priors, Stratford-on-Avon; England
- Coordinates: 52.1599°N 1.8847°W
- Grid reference: SP 080513
- Platforms: 1

Other information
- Status: Disused

History
- Original company: Evesham & Redditch Railway
- Pre-grouping: Midland Railway
- Post-grouping: London, Midland and Scottish Railway; London Midland Region of British Railways

Key dates
- 16 June 1866: Station opens
- 1 October 1962: last train ran
- 17 June 1963: official closure date
Location

Salford Priors railway station was a railway station located in the village of Salford Priors, Warwickshire, England. Opened on 16 June 1866 (17 September for passengers) as part of the Evesham & Redditch Railway, it had only one platform but a brick built waiting room/ticket office and station master's house. It closed on 17 June 1963, although the last train ran on 1 October 1962, after which the train service was suspended due to the poor condition of the track. A bus service replaced it while the statutory closure process was gone through.

The station building itself is still in existence, little changed and has been used as an office building. The goods shed still stands. The station building is now owned by a property developer company, Bromford Turner, who have applied to demolish the building.

Preceding station	Disused railways	Following station
Bidford-on-Avon; Line and station closed	London, Midland and Scottish Railway; Stratford-upon-Avon and Midland Junction Railway	Harvington; Line and station closed
Broom Junction; Line and station closed	London, Midland and Scottish Railway; Evesham loop line	Harvington; Line and station closed
