= Studley & Astwood Bank railway station =

Former railway station in Warwickshire, England

Studley & Astwood Bank
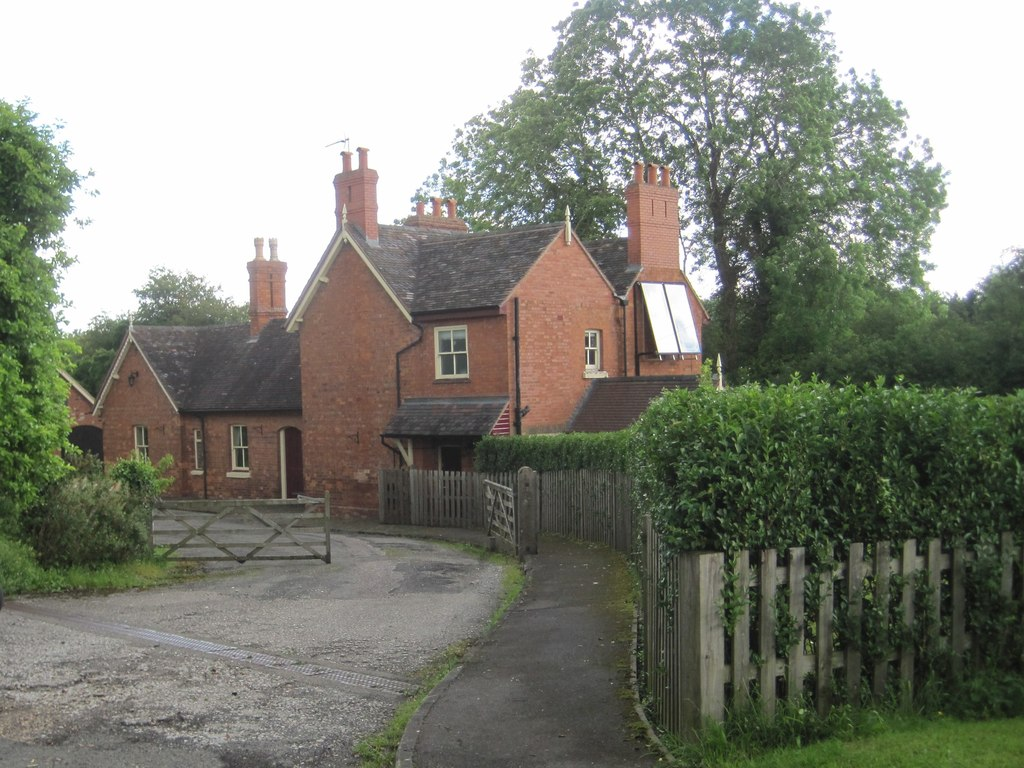
- The site of the station in 2014

General information
- Location: Studley, Warwickshire; England
- Coordinates: 52.2711°N 1.9140°W
- Grid reference: SP059636
- Platforms: 1

Other information
- Status: Disused

History
- Original company: Evesham and Redditch Railway
- Pre-grouping: Midland Railway
- Post-grouping: London, Midland and Scottish Railway

Key dates
- 4 May 1868: Opened
- 1 October 1962: passenger train service withdrawn
- 17 June 1963: Officially closed to passengers
- 6 July 1964: Closed
Location

Studley & Astwood Bank railway station was a station in Studley, Warwickshire, England. The station was opened on 4 May 1868, passenger train service withdrawn in 1962 officially closed to passengers on 17 June 1963 and closed completely on 6 July 1964.

| Preceding station | Disused railways | Following station |
|---|---|---|
| Redditch; Line closed, station open | London, Midland and Scottish Railway; Evesham loop line | Coughton; Line and station closed |
