= Binton =

Village in Warwickshire, England

Coordinates: 52.186322°N 1.795231°W

- Location within Warwickshire
- Population: 311 (2011 census)
- OS grid reference: SP145545
- District: Stratford-on-Avon
- Shire county: Warwickshire
- Region: West Midlands
- Country: England
- Sovereign state: United Kingdom
- Post town: Stratford-upon-Avon
- Postcode district: CV37
- Dialling code: 01789
- Police: Warwickshire
- Fire: Warwickshire
- Ambulance: West Midlands
- UK Parliament: Stratford-on-Avon

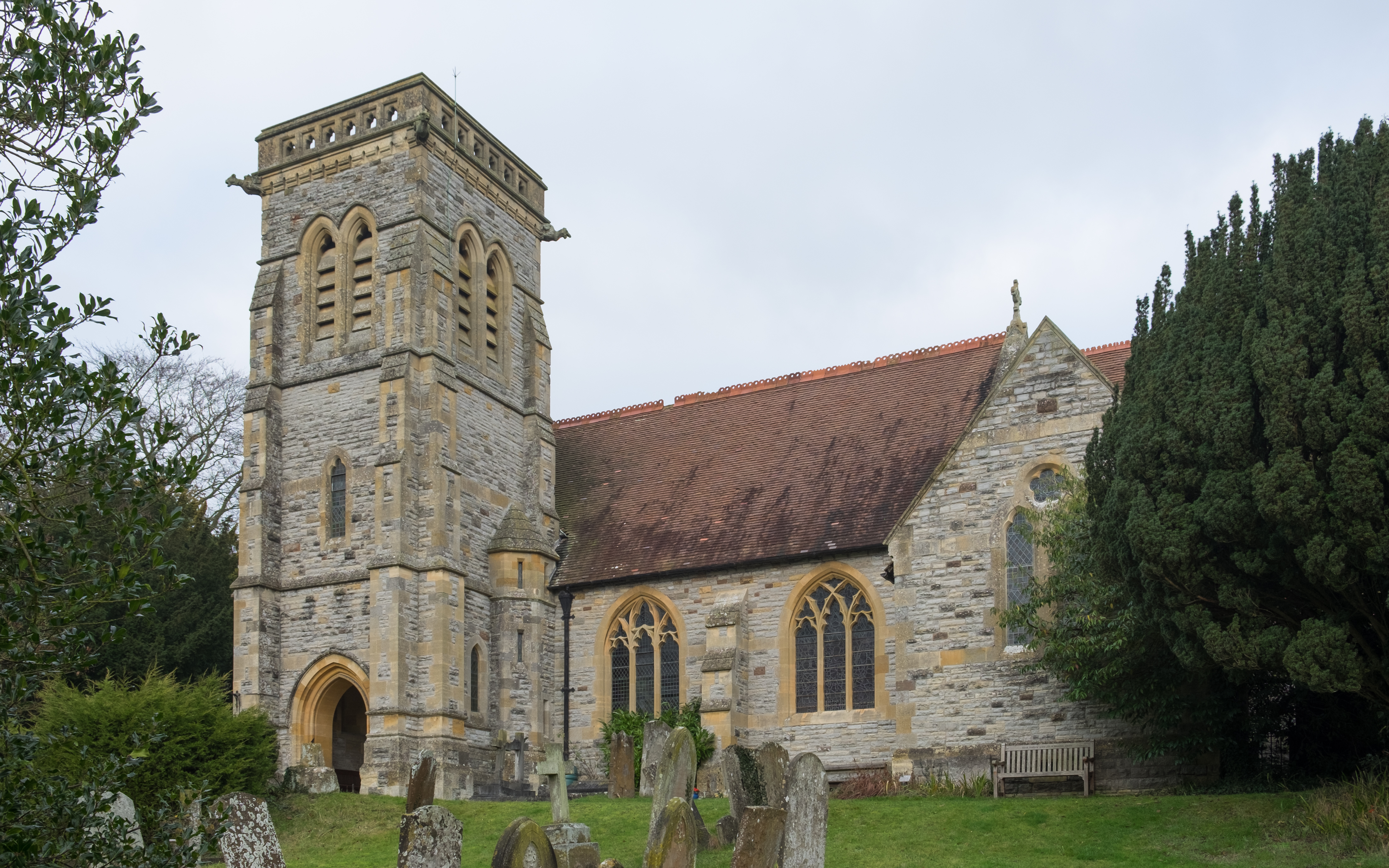
St Peter's Church, Binton

Binton is a village and civil parish in the Stratford district of Warwickshire, England. It is about five miles (8.0 km) west of Stratford-upon-Avon. According to the 2001 census it had a population of 272, increasing to 311 at the 2011 census.

== History ==
The name Binton probably derives from Bina's Ton (or town), Bina being a former Anglo-Saxon owner of the village. Binton is unusual in that it has four entries in the Domesday Book of 1086. There were four major landholders named William, Gerin, Urso and Hugh. The total value of all their property was £8 and 10s, a lot of money at the time. Adding together the figures given gives an area of 1,538 acres (6 km^{2}), whilst the modern parish is only 1,300 acres (5 km^{2}). This is because some of the original manor is now in Temple Grafton parish. Therefore, according to the Domesday Book, in 1086, Binton had a population of 29 families with 150 people working seven ploughs and three mills. Altogether, this is very impressive for an eleventh-century manor.

Binton Manor belonged to many different families over time - the Wyncote family held it for the longest period, from 1325 until 1531. Its church is St Peter's Church - there has been a building on the same site since at least 1286, though the current structure was built in 1875 by the Conway family, which by then owned much of the village and whose ancestor Edward Viscount Conway of Ragley Hall had bought the manor in 1670 (the family retains the title). Binton gained many other new facilities in the 19th century. In addition to the church and rectory, there was the village spring across the road from the church, and, in the main street, a school, a village shop, a post office, and a pub (The White Horse).

There was a forge and, on the main Evesham Road, there was the Binton railway station, now the sole surviving East and West Junction railway station, albeit disused. The school, shop, post office, pub, and forge no longer exist, due to the process of gentrification, where agricultural workers have been replaced by retired people and commuters who work in the surrounding area. There is a parish council. In local government, the village was put in Stratford Rural District Council at its inception in 1894, and then, 80 years later, was absorbed into the larger Stratford-on-Avon District, which is where it is today. The nearest primary school is in Temple Grafton. The nearest secondary schools are in Stratford-upon-Avon and Alcester.
