= Binton railway station =

Former railway station in Warwickshire, England

Coordinates: 52.17616°N 1.79329°W

Binton
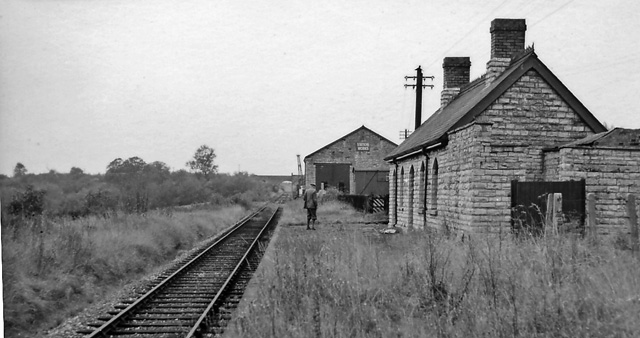
- Remains of Binton station. View westward, towards Broom Junction

General information
- Location: Binton, Stratford-on-Avon; England
- Platforms: 1

Other information
- Status: Disused

History
- Original company: Evesham, Redditch and Stratford-upon-Avon Junction Railway
- Pre-grouping: SuA&MJR
- Post-grouping: London, Midland and Scottish Railway; Western Region of British Railways

Key dates
- 22 February 1885: Station opens
- 16 June 1947: Last passenger train
- 23 May 1949: Station closes
Location

Binton railway station was a railway station serving the village of Binton in Warwickshire, England.

Opened by the Evesham Redditch and Stratford-upon-Avon Junction Railway between Broom Junction and Stratford upon Avon, it was adjacent to the Evesham Road midway between Binton and Welford-on-Avon.

== History ==
The East and West Junction Railway had opened between Stratford-upon-Avon and Towcester between 1871 and 1873. Income from the line was much less than hoped for. A new section, promoted as the Evesham Redditch and Stratford-upon-Avon Junction Railway, was incorporated in 1873 and opened in 1879. This connected with the Midland Railway at Broom Junction. By this time however the East and West Junction had ceased carrying passengers, and did not restart until 1885 which is when this station was built.

However though the East and West had been using the ER&SJ, it had not been making any payments and the latter became virtually bankrupt in 1886. They were helped by a partial organisation in 1908 with the merger into the Stratford-upon-Avon and Midland Junction Railway The group of lines carried on unsteadily until grouping in 1923 when they became part of the London Midland and Scottish Railway

This line to the west of Stratford was treated as being separate by the LMS and passenger traffic was minimal, being limited to, in 1905 for instance, four trains daily in each direction. This continued until 1938, when World War II meant that the service was reduced to one day train daily in each direction. Even this service was discontinued on 16 June 1947. Both this station and Bidford-on-Avon closed on 23 May 1949. Freight traffic ceased in 1960 and the line was lifted.

The station was constructed of local blue lias stone (Binton stone) with brick chimneys. The stone for the station and the goods shed could well have been dug out of the deep cutting next to the station in the direction of Broom junction . There was one platform for the single line which had a passing loop to the west. This connected to a siding to the rear of the station with a carriage dock and a goods shed which included the luxury of a 30 cwt hand-operated crane. As of 31 December 2013, virtually all trace of the line has disappeared.

Binton station survives as a private house (converted in 2019) when the goods shed was demolished.

== Routes ==
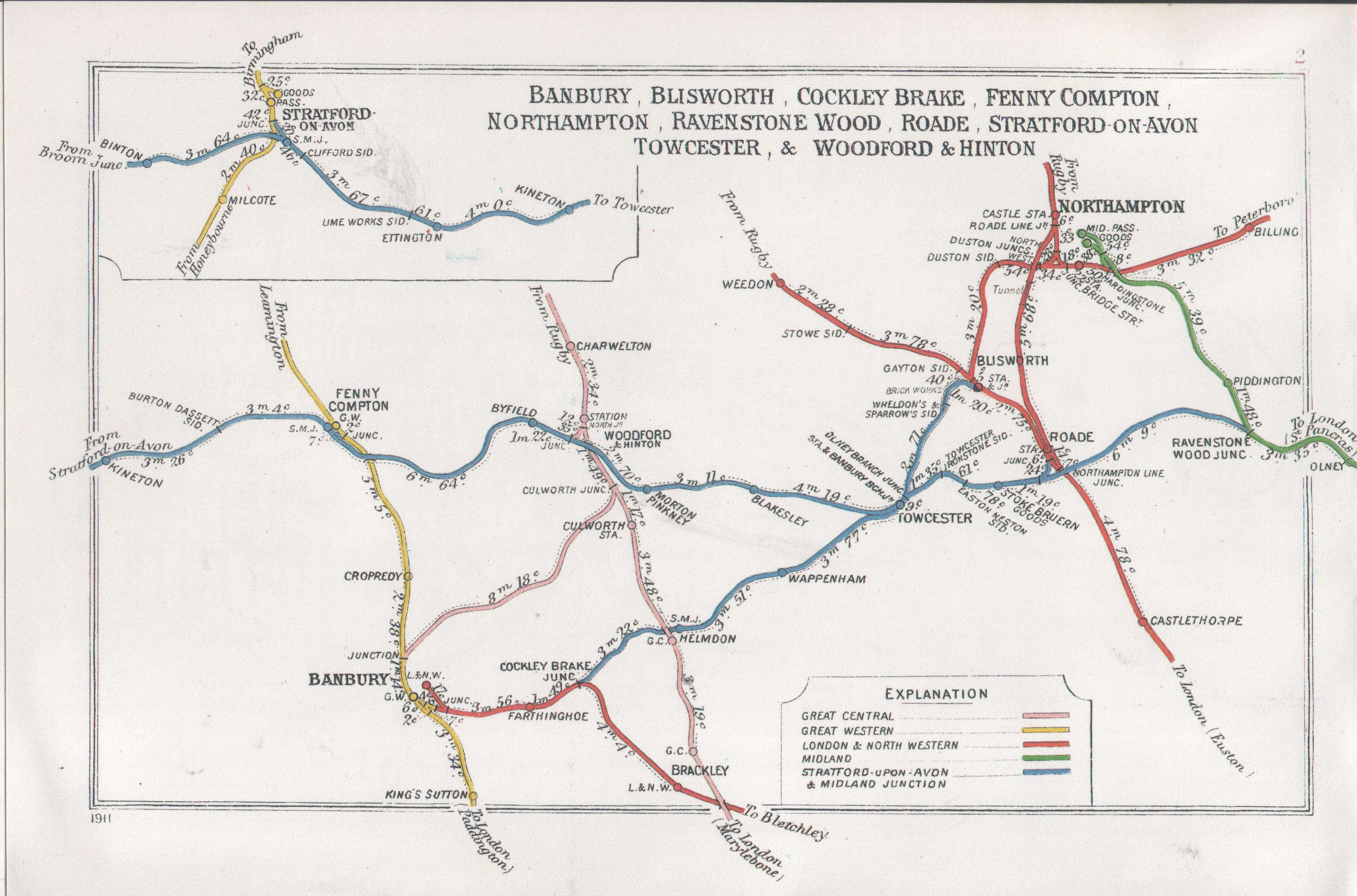
A 1911 Railway Clearing House map of railways in the vicinity of Binton (upper left panel, in blue)

| Preceding station | Disused railways | Following station |
|---|---|---|
| Bidford-on-Avon | SMJR; Evesham, Redditch and Stratford-upon-Avon Junction Railway | Stratford-upon-Avon (Old Town) |
