= Bidford-on-Avon railway station =

Former railway station in Warwickshire, England

Coordinates: 52.17438°N 1.85741°W

Bidford-on-Avon
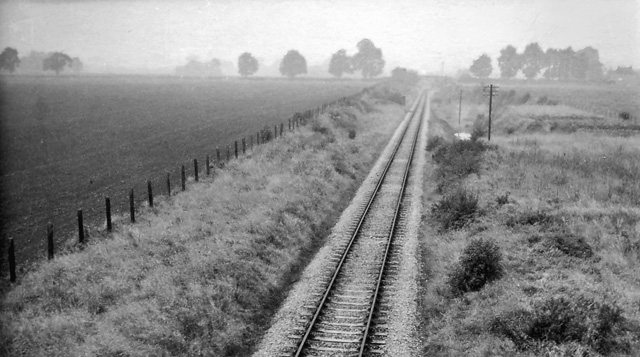
- The site of the station in 1960

General information
- Location: Broom, Stratford-on-Avon; England
- Platforms: 1

Other information
- Status: Disused

History
- Original company: Evesham, Redditch and Stratford-upon-Avon Junction Railway
- Pre-grouping: SuA&MJR
- Post-grouping: London, Midland and Scottish Railway; Western Region of British Railways

Key dates
- 22 February 1885: Station opens
- 1 July 1909: Renamed Bidford on Avon
- 19 February 1917: Closed
- 1 January 1919: Reopened
- 16 June 1947: Last passenger train
- 23 May 1949: Station closes
Location

Bidford-on-Avon railway station was a railway station serving the village of Bidford-on-Avon in Warwickshire, England.

== History ==
The East and West Junction Railway had opened between Stratford-upon-Avon and Towcester between 1871 and 1873. Income from the line was much less than hoped for and a new section, promoted as the Evesham Redditch and Stratford-upon-Avon Junction Railway, was incorporated in 1873 and opened in 1879. This connected with the Midland Railway at Broom Junction. By then however the East and West Junction had ceased carrying passengers, and did not restart until 1885 which is when the station was built.

However though the East and West had been using the ER&SJ, it had not been making any payments and the latter became virtually bankrupt in 1886. They were helped by a partial organisation in 1908 with their merger into the Stratford-upon-Avon and Midland Junction Railway The group of lines carried on unsteadily until grouping in 1923 when they became part of the London Midland and Scottish Railway.

This line to the west of Stratford was treated as being separate by the LMS and passenger traffic was minimal, being limited to, in 1905 for instance, four trains daily in each direction. This continued until 1938, when World War II meant that the service was reduced to one day train daily in each direction. Even this service was discontinued in on 16 June 1947. Both this station and Binton closed on 23 May 1949. Freight traffic ceased in 1960 and the line was lifted.

Preceding station	Disused railways	Following station
Broom Junction	SMJR; Evesham, Redditch and Stratford-upon-Avon Junction Railway	Binton
