= Fred Wilkes =

English footballer

Personal information
- Date of birth: 26 August 1883
- Place of birth: Bidford-on-Avon, England
- Date of death: 1942 (aged 58–59)
- Position: Left back

Senior career*
Years	Team	Apps	(Gls)
- Reading
1908–1912	Tottenham Hotspur	57	(0)
- * Club domestic league appearances and goals

Frederick Wilkes (26 August 1883 –1942) was an English professional footballer who played for Reading and Tottenham Hotspur, as a defender

== Football career ==
Wilkes began his playing career at Reading. In 1908, the left back joined Tottenham Hotspur, between 1908 and 1912 Wilkes made 60 appearances in all competitions for "Spurs".
