= Alcester railway station =

Former railway station in Warwickshire, England

Alcester
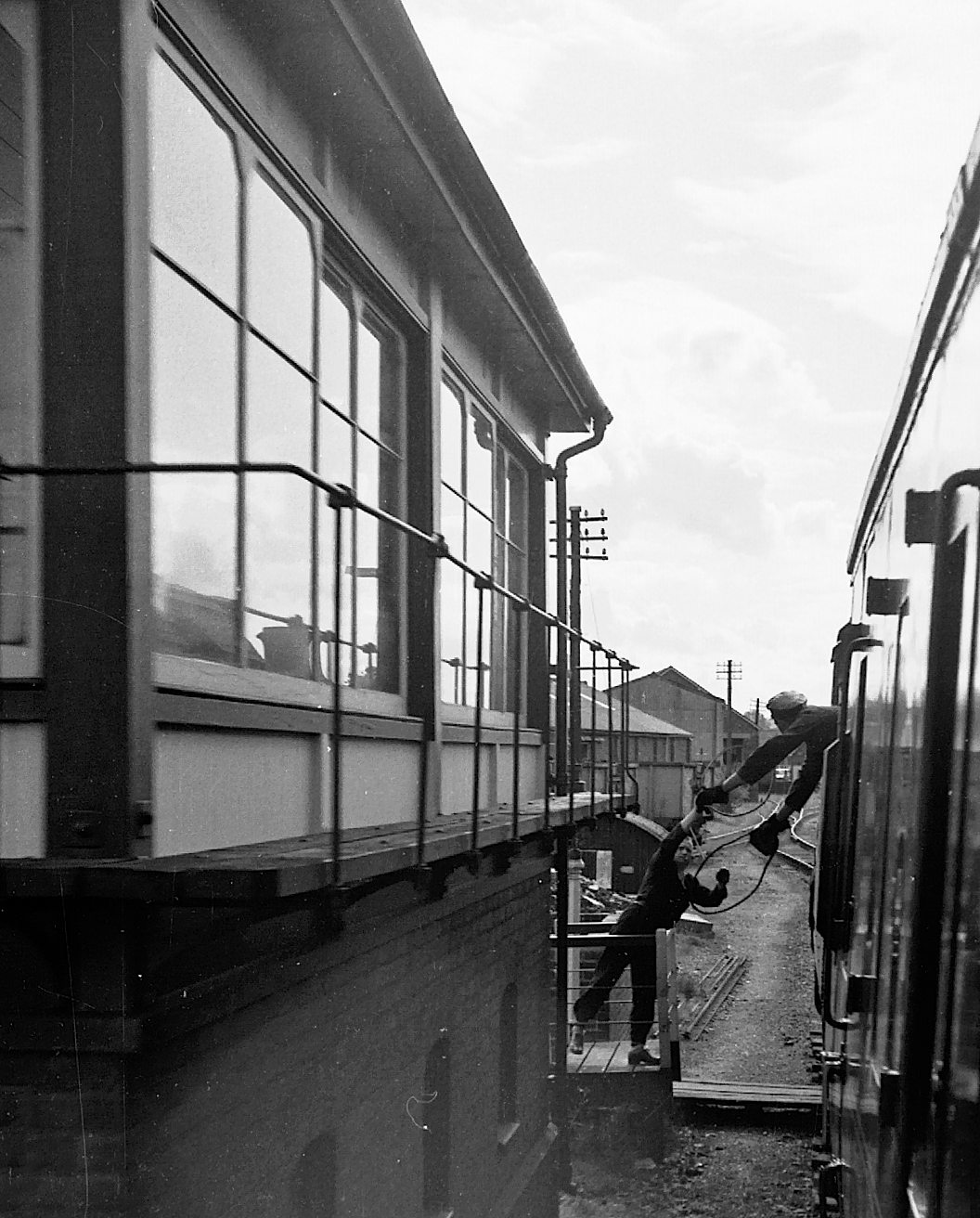
- The station in June 1962

General information
- Location: Alcester, Stratford-on-Avon; England
- Coordinates: 52.2169°N 1.8776°W
- Grid reference: SP083576
- Platforms: 2

Other information
- Status: Disused

History
- Original company: Evesham and Redditch Railway
- Pre-grouping: Midland Railway
- Post-grouping: London, Midland and Scottish Railway; London Midland Region of British Railways

Key dates
- 17 September 1866: Opened
- 1 October 1962: Final train
- 17 June 1963: Closed to passengers
- 6 June 1964: Closed
Location

Alcester was a railway station serving Alcester in the English county of Warwickshire.

== History ==
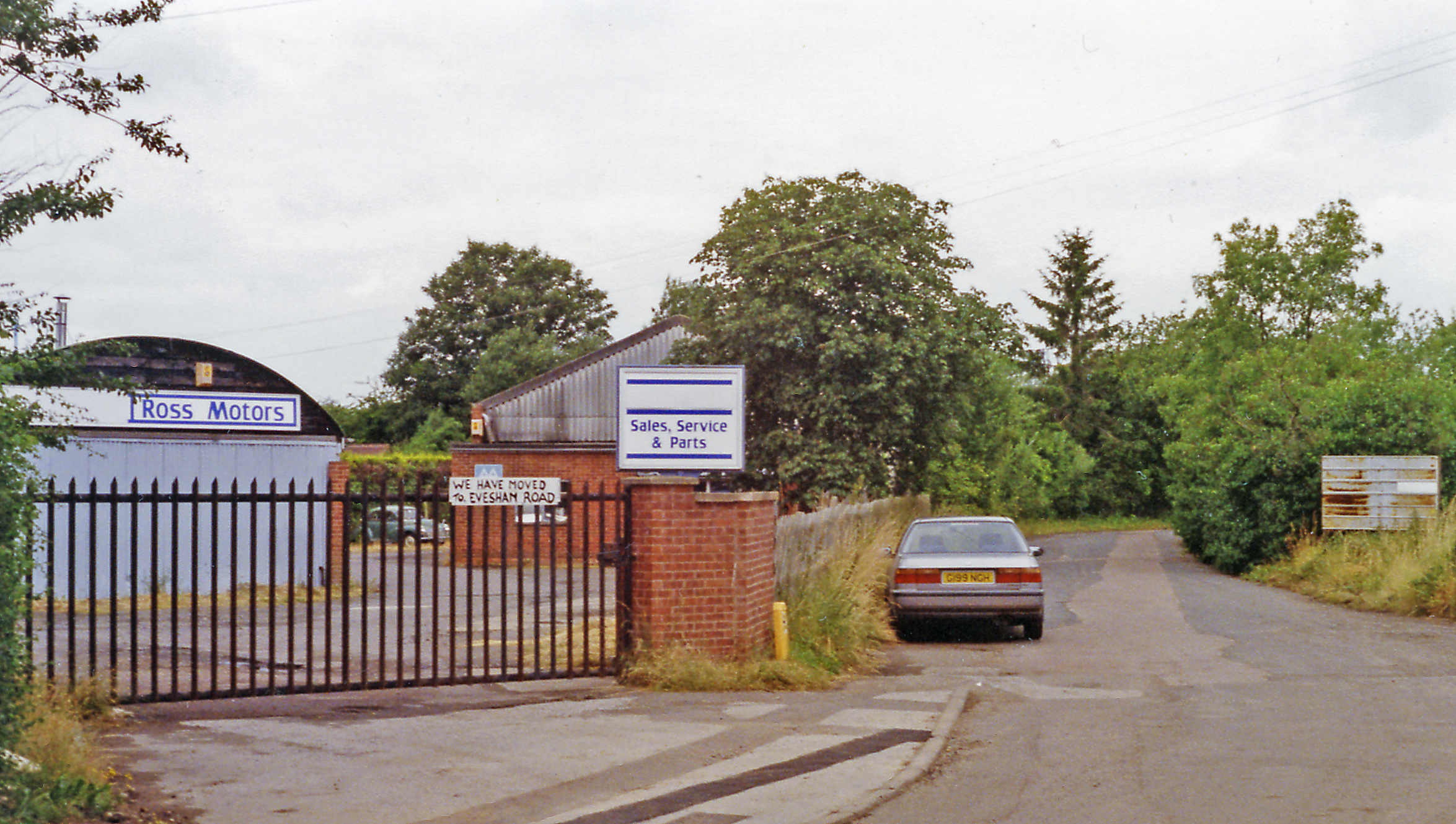
Location of the former station in 1994

Opened by the Evesham and Redditch Railway, and joining the Midland Railway, it became part of the London, Midland and Scottish Railway during the Grouping of 1923. The line then passed on to the London Midland Region of British Railways on nationalisation in 1948. It was then closed by the British Railways Board.

For a while the station was the junction of a Great Western Railway line to Bearley.

Preceding station	Disused railways	Following station
Coughton	London Midland and Scottish Railway; Evesham loop line	Wixford
Terminus	Great Western Railway; Alcester to Bearley Line	Great Alne

== The site today ==
The station house is lived in and has been extended. The goods shed has now been demolished. The former railway alignment is now occupied by a housing estate.
