= Broom Junction railway station =

Former railway station in Warwickshire, England

Coordinates: 52.178808°N 1.876671°W

Broom Junction
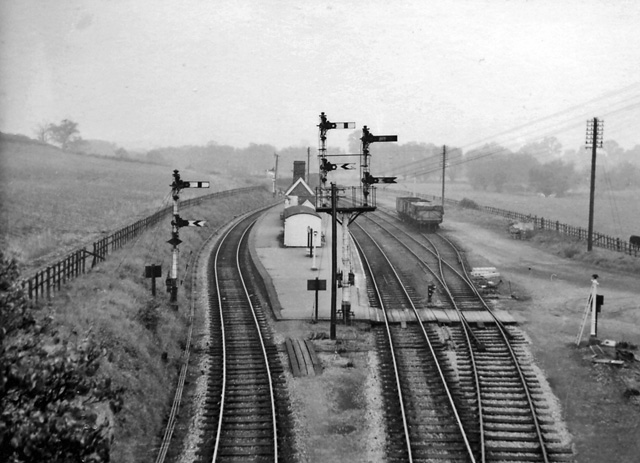
- Station in October 1960

General information
- Location: Broom, Stratford-on-Avon; England
- Grid reference: SP085534
- Platforms: 2

Other information
- Status: Disused

History
- Original company: Evesham & Redditch Railway / East and West Junction Railway
- Pre-grouping: Midland Railway / Stratford-upon-Avon and Midland Junction Railway
- Post-grouping: London, Midland and Scottish Railway; London Midland Region of British Railways

Key dates
- 2 June 1879: Opened as an exchange platform
- 1 November 1880: Became a public station
- 23 May 1949: End of SMJR passenger services
- 13 June 1960: End of SMJR goods services
- 5 July 1962: Closure of signal boxes
- 1 October 1962: Closure of station
- 17 June 1963: Withdrawal of replacement bus services
Location

Broom Junction was a railway station serving the village of Broom in Warwickshire, England. It was an interchange for both the Stratford-upon-Avon and Midland Junction Railway and the Barnt Green to Ashchurch line.

Although initially only an exchange station, it was opened to the public from 1880 and remained in service until 1963. Other than passengers changing trains, passenger traffic was low as the station was situated in a sparsely populated area. The line to Stratford was the first to close in 1960, followed by the Barnt Green line in 1962.

== History ==
In 1873, the East and West Junction Railway (E&WJ) received authorisation in the Evesham, Redditch, and Stratford-upon-Avon Junction Railway Act 1873 (36 & 37 Vict. c. ccxlv) to construct a 7.75 miles (12.47 km) eastwards extension of its Stratford to Blisworth line to join with the Evesham and Redditch Railway's (E&R) Barnt Green to Ashchurch line which had opened six years previously. The new line joined at the Warwickshire village of Broom where it formed a northward facing junction with the E&R's line.

In completing the line to Broom, the length of the Stratford-upon-Avon and Midland Junction Railway (SMJR) was increased to 45 miles (72 km), rising to 55.5 miles (89.3 km) in 1882 with the completion of a further extension south to Olney railway station. The completed line also provided a connection between two lines worked by the Midland Railway which absorbed the E&R in 1882.

The new line opened to traffic on 2 June 1879 and an island platform was provided at Broom to allow passengers to change trains en route. Trains from the E&WJ worked into a single north-facing platform by an awkward west to north movement, across the main lines. The return journey required a reversal south to the engine turntable situated at the end of a siding on the other side of the road bridge. The Midland allowed the E&WJ to use the station subject to the sharing of costs, and the E&WJ were given running rights over the Midland's line although it only ever exercised use of the 5 chains (330 ft; 100 m) into the station.

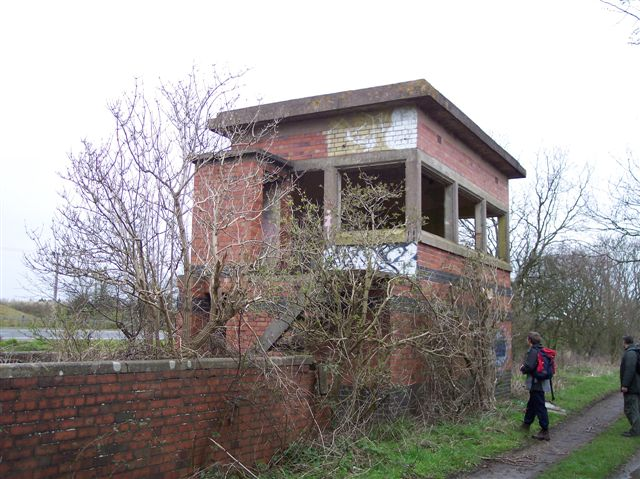
Remains of Broom West box

Broom first appeared in public timetables in November 1880. Meagre passenger facilities were provided in the shape of two old coach bodies and a small brick booking office; a sectional concrete shed was added later. At first two north and south signal boxes were provided, but this arrangement was rationalised in 1934 by the London, Midland and Scottish Railway, which concentrated the junction's workings into one box known as Broom Junction. The advent of the Second World War led to the installation of a south-to-east curve between the SMJR and Barnt Green line to allow through running of Gloucester to London services. This required two new signal boxes: one on the curve entrance from Stratford known as Broom West, and another on the original connecting line known as Broom East. All three later closed on 5 July 1962.

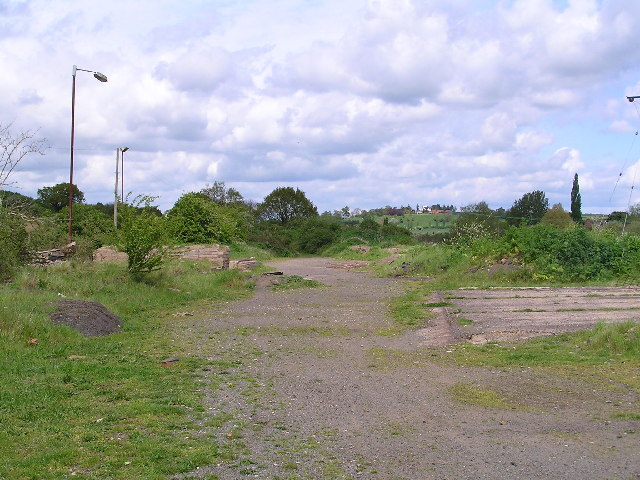
Station site in 2005.

As a passenger station, Broom was not particularly successful: it served a small rural community and was very susceptible to road competition. Passenger services to Stratford were temporarily withdrawn on 16 June 1947 and permanently from 23 May 1949, at which point the station was only seeing two daily workings. Its ghost lingered on in the Barnt Green to Ashchurch timetables until 1962, as the 1pm service from Birmingham New Street to Ashchurch continued to wait at Broom for 20 minutes for a connection which had long ceased. Goods services between Stratford and Broom continued until 13 June 1960, the freight being diverted via a new south curve at Stratford between the SMJR and Honeybourne line. The Barnt Green line itself closed between Redditch and Evesham from 1 October 1962 due to the unsafe condition of the track; British Railways provided a replacement bus service using hired Midland Red buses, but this was found to be similarly uneconomical and was withdrawn from 17 June 1963.

| Preceding station | Disused railways | Following station |
|---|---|---|
| Terminus | SMJR; Evesham, Redditch and Stratford-upon-Avon Junction Railway | Bidford-on-Avon |
| Wixford | Midland Railway; Evesham loop line | Salford Priors |

== Present day ==
Although the station buildings have been cleared away, remnants of the platform still remain. The trackbed running through the site has been incorporated into a north–south footpath. The site was used for some time as a depot for Warwickshire County Council's Highways Department. A replica of Broom's station building has been constructed at Swanwick Junction station.
