= Wixford railway station =

Former railway station in Warwickshire, England

Wixford

General information
- Location: Wixford, Stratford-on-Avon; England
- Coordinates: 52.1895°N 1.8756°W
- Grid reference: SP085545
- Platforms: 1

Other information
- Status: Disused

History
- Original company: Evesham and Redditch Railway
- Pre-grouping: Midland Railway
- Post-grouping: London, Midland and Scottish Railway; London Midland Region of British Railways

Key dates
- 17 September 1866: Opened
- 2 January 1950: Closed
Location

Wixford railway station was a railway station serving Wixford, a village in the English county of Warwickshire. Located on the edge of the village it was accessed by steps down from a bridge carrying the B4085 (Icknield Street).

Opened 17 September 1866 the station was originally going to be a temporary one but was eventually made permanent by the Midland Railway. From the start the station was staffed from a small wooden hut which included the waiting room and toilet. As well as the hut there were lampposts for lighting and a bench. There was a single track siding which included a loading gauge, portable livestock ramp and a small goods shed.

Aside from a short period in 1901 when the nearby River Arrow flooded and damaged the line, the station remained open through to 1950. Passenger and freight services ended on the same day that year, although the line was operational for several years afterwards before being closed in 1962 and lifted in 1965. The station site is still accessible and although the track bed is completely covered there are remains of the platform.

Preceding station	Disused railways	Following station
Alcester	London Midland and Scottish Railway; Evesham loop line	Broom Junction
