= Erdington railway station =

Railway station in the West Midlands, England

Erdington
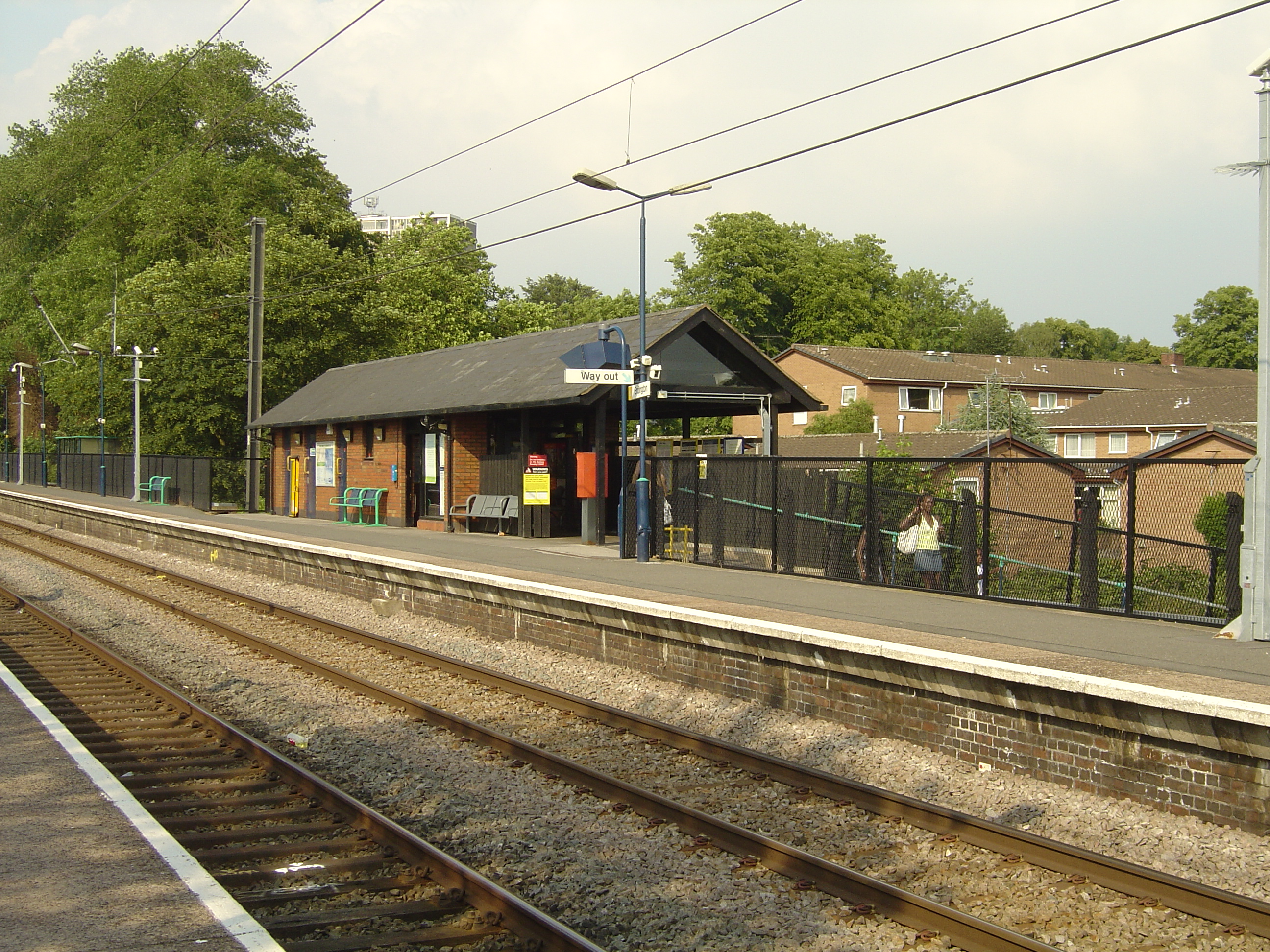
- Erdington station, showing the south-bound platform

General information
- Location: Erdington, Birmingham; England
- Coordinates: 52.528°N 1.839°W
- Grid reference: SP109923
- Manager: West Midlands Railway
- Transit authority: Transport for West Midlands
- Platforms: 2

Other information
- Station code: ERD
- Fare zone: 3
- Classification: DfT category E

History
- Opened: 1862

Passengers
- 2021/22: ▲0.329 million
- 2022/23: ▲0.397 million
- 2023/24: ▲0.455 million
- 2024/25: ▲0.481 million
- 2025/26: ▲0.523 million
Location
Notes
- Passenger statistics from the Office of Rail and Road

Erdington railway station is a railway station serving the Erdington area of Birmingham, England. It is situated on the Redditch/Bromsgrove-Birmingham New Street-Four Oaks-Lichfield Cross-City Line.

Pedestrian access is via Station Road. There is no car park designated for this station. Platform 1 and 2 have separate entrances. Platform 1's entrance being next to St Thomas Associations carpark and the second being past the tunnel on the other side by the shops. While in the station, there is no way to switch between platforms without exiting the station. The station is above road level, as the line here is on an embankment. A new passenger shelter on the northbound platform was built and opened in November 2006.

== History ==
The station was opened in 1862 by the London and North Western Railway (LNWR) on Sheep Lane, later known as Station Road.

The letters LMS can still be seen on the adjacent road bridge. At the foot of the ramp to the southbound platform there is a sculpture by Ronald Rae entitled Insect and Celtic Cross.

== Facilities ==
The station has a ticket office and ticket machines on platform 2, and a shelter on platform 1. Both platforms have benches and help points.

=== Access for disabled passengers ===
There are ramps accessing both platforms at Erdington Station. Erdington has been classified as a step-free access category B1 station. This means that there is step-free access to all platforms, but that this may include long or steep ramps, as is the case here.

== Services ==
The station is served by West Midlands Trains with local Transport for West Midlands branded "Cross-City" services, operated using Class 730 Electric multiple units (EMUs).

The off-peak service pattern is as follows:

Mondays to Saturdays:

- 4tph northbound to Four Oaks via Sutton Coldfield, departing from Platform 1.
  - Of which:
    - 2tph continue to Lichfield Trent Valley via Lichfield City.
- 4tph southbound to Longbridge via Birmingham New Street and University, departing from Platform 2.
  - Of which:
    - 2tph continue to Redditch via Alvechurch, calling at all stations.
    - 2tph continue to Bromsgrove calling at all stations except Duddeston, 1tph does not call at Barnt Green.

Sundays:

- 2tph northbound to Lichfield Trent Valley.
- 2tph southbound to Redditch.

Services on Sundays call at all stations between Lichfield T.V. and Redditch.

The average journey time to Birmingham New Street is around 13 minutes.

Preceding station	National Rail	Following station
Chester Road	West Midlands Railway; Lichfield – Four Oaks – Birmingham – Bromsgrove/Redditch; Cross-City Line	Gravelly Hill
