= Northfield railway station =

Railway station in the West Midlands, England

Northfield
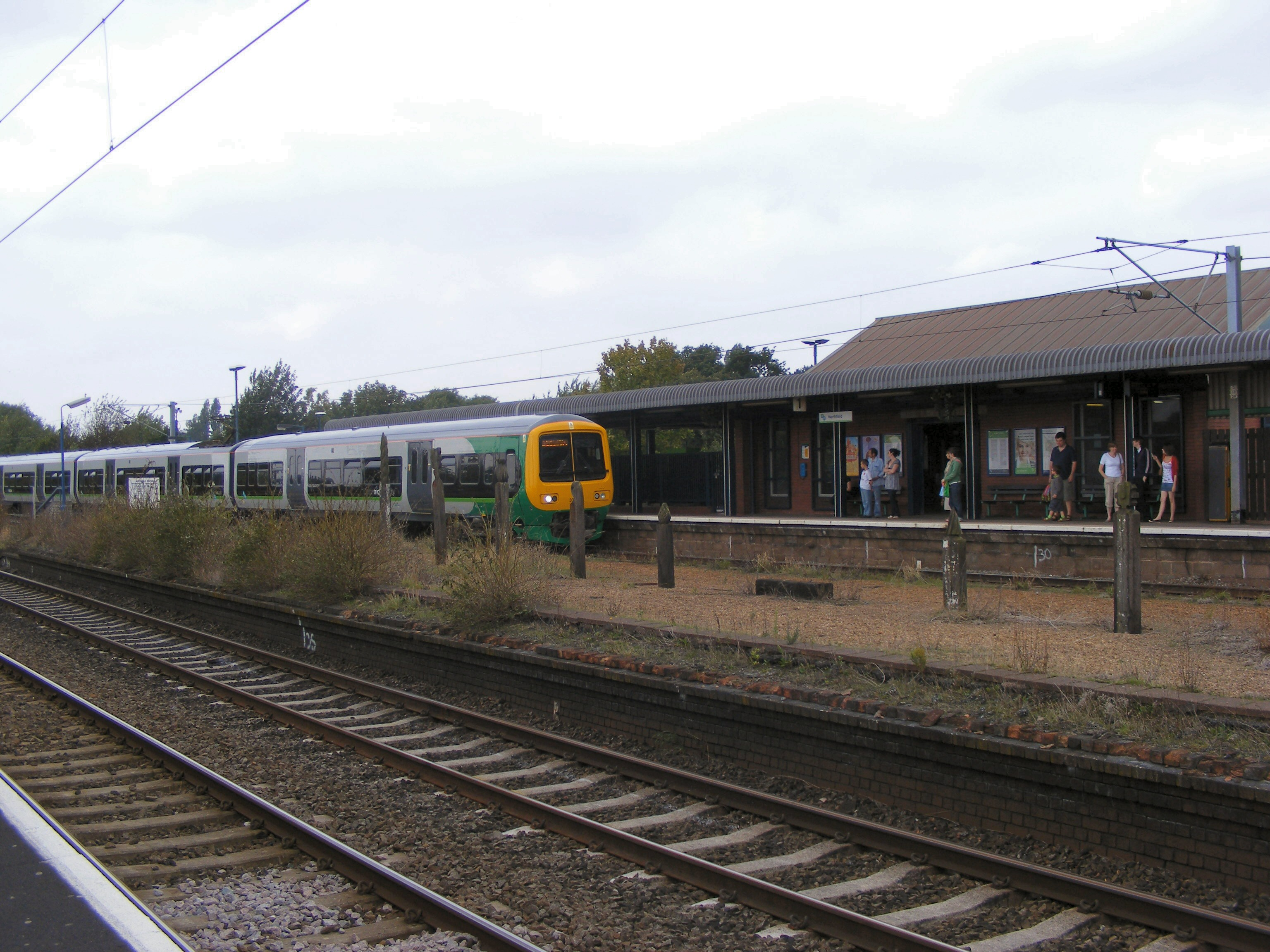

General information
- Location: Northfield, Birmingham; England
- Coordinates: 52.408°N 1.964°W
- Grid reference: SP024789
- Manager: West Midlands Railway
- Transit authority: Transport for West Midlands
- Platforms: 2
- Tracks: 4

Other information
- Station code: NFD
- Fare zone: 4
- Classification: DfT category E

History
- Opened: 1870

Key dates
- 1978: Rebuilt

Passengers
- 2021/22: ▲0.392 million
- 2022/23: ▲0.489 million
- 2023/24: ▲0.576 million
- 2024/25: ▲0.643 million
- 2025/26: ▲0.698 million
Location
Notes
- Passenger statistics from the Office of Rail and Road

Northfield railway station serves the Northfield area of Birmingham, England. It is situated on the Cross-City Line, and is managed by West Midlands Trains, who also operate all of the rail services that serve it.

== History ==
The station was opened on 1 September 1870 by the Midland Railway. In 1892, the line through Northfield was quadrupled (though only the inner pair of lines had platform access).

In 1913 it was the subject of an arson attack by suffragettes. The fire was extinguished before serious damage was done.

The station was placed under threat of closure in 1963, when the suburban service to Redditch was listed for withdrawal in the Beeching Report and its frequency cut significantly. Following widespread public opposition and a campaign by local MPs, the route was subsequently reprieved in 1965 but for the next thirteen years it only received a limited service (just four return trips per day to and from New Street).

In May 1978, the West Midlands Passenger Transport Executive launched the new Cross City line suburban service, which linked the existing New Street to Lichfield route to a revamped service along the former Midland main line through Kings Norton to a newly re-sited terminus at Longbridge. One completely new station was opened at University (Birmingham), two others reopened and the remainder rebuilt and upgraded. Northfield received new slow line platforms as part of the £7.4 million upgrade package. and other improvements to the designs of the architect John Broome Since then, the station has received a regular interval service from Birmingham and a variety of other improvements (notably the extension of the route at both ends in the 1980s and electrification in 1993).

In 2013, lifts were built on both sides of the subway to allow disabled access to both platforms.

It currently has two operational platforms, numbered '1' and '4', with a disused island platform in the centre of the four-track lines.

== Services ==
The station is served by West Midlands Trains with local Transport for West Midlands branded "Cross-City" services, operated using Class 323 Electric multiple units (EMUs) until September 2024 and currently by Class 730 EMUs.

The off-peak service pattern is as follows:

Mondays to Saturdays:

- 4tph northbound to Four Oaks via University, Birmingham New Street and Sutton Coldfield, departing from Platform 1.
  - Of which:
    - 2tph continue to Lichfield Trent Valley via Lichfield City, calling at all stations except Duddeston.
- 4tph southbound to Longbridge, departing from Platform 4.
  - Of which:
    - 2tph continue to Redditch via Alvechurch, calling at all stations.
    - 2tph continue to Bromsgrove, 1tph does not call at Barnt Green.

Sundays:

- 2 tph northbound to Lichfield Trent Valley.
- 2 tph southbound to Redditch.
- 1 tph northbound to Birmingham New Street.
- 1 tph southbound to Bromsgrove.

Services on Sundays call at all stations between Lichfield T.V. and Redditch and all stations between Bromsgrove and Birmingham New Street.

Preceding station	National Rail	Following station
Kings Norton	West Midlands Railway Lichfield – Four Oaks – Birmingham – Bromsgrove/Redditch; Cross-City Line	Longbridge

== Connections ==
National Express West Midlands route 48 (West Bromwich - Hawkesley via Harborne and Bearwood ) stops on nearby Church Hill.

Kev’s Cars and Coaches route 19 (Maypole - Rubery) stops directly outside the station building.

== Facilities ==
The station has a ticket office and Automated Ticket Machines. The station is also equipped with Real-Time Information boards and recorded announcements.

The station has a car park, provided free by Transport for West Midlands.
