= Chester Road railway station =

Railway station in the West Midlands, England

Chester Road
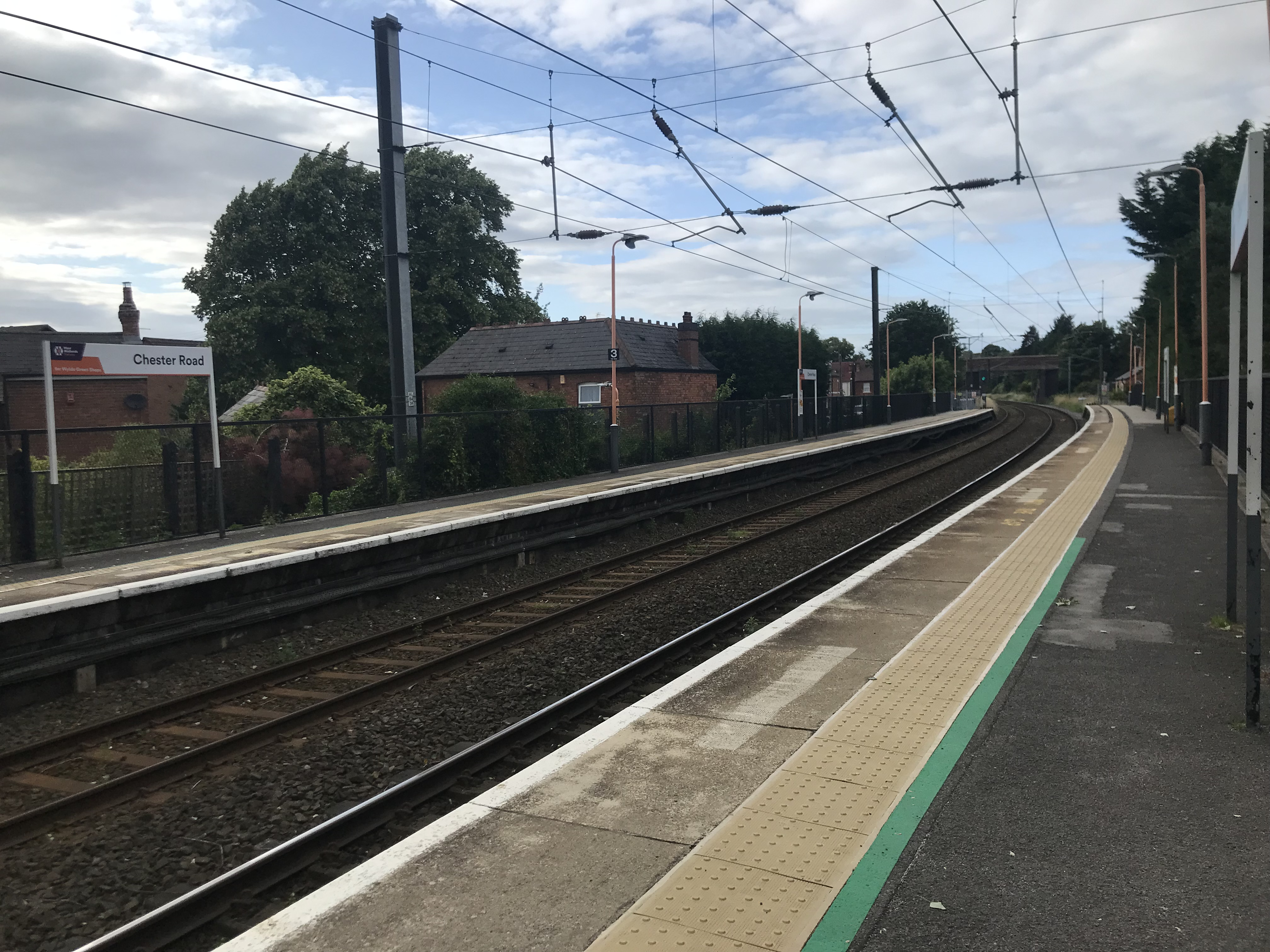
- Chester Road station, looking northbound towards Wylde Green

General information
- Location: Wylde Green, Birmingham, England
- Coordinates: 52.535°N 1.832°W
- Grid reference: SP114931
- Manager: West Midlands Railway
- Transit authority: Transport for West Midlands
- Platforms: 2

Other information
- Station code: CRD
- Fare zone: 3
- Classification: DfT category E

History
- Original company: London and North Western Railway
- Pre-grouping: London and North Western Railway
- Post-grouping: London Midland and Scottish Railway

Key dates
- 1 December 1863: Station opened

Passengers
- 2021/22: ▲0.390 million
- 2022/23: ▲0.489 million
- 2023/24: ▲0.593 million
- 2024/25: ▲0.659 million
- 2025/26: ▲0.730 million
Location
Notes
- Passenger statistics from the Office of Rail and Road

Chester Road railway station serves the areas of Pype Hayes, Erdington and Wylde Green in northeast Birmingham, West Midlands, England. It is sited on the Cross-City Line between Bromsgrove/Redditch and Lichfield Trent Valley, via Birmingham New Street. Pedestrian access to the station is via Green Lanes, close to the junction with the Chester Road (A452). It is above road level, as the line here is on an embankment.

== History ==
The line from Aston to Sutton Coldfield was built by the London and North Western Railway (LNWR) in 1862, although Chester Road station was not opened until 1 December 1863. The LNWR became part of the London Midland and Scottish Railway in 1921, as part of the Grouping, which was nationalised to become part of British Railways at the beginning of 1948. The station booking office and waiting room were rebuilt in 1991-1992 during the electrification of the line. The original LNWR station waiting room was dismantled, and moved to Market Bosworth, another former LNWR station, on the preserved Battlefield Line Railway.

In 2019, as part of the West Midlands Railway branding of the stations they manage, Chester Road was among those given orange lampposts and railings. This received a mediocre response from locals, MP Andrew Mitchell and the leader of Sutton Coldfield Town Council, Simon Ward.

== Facilities ==
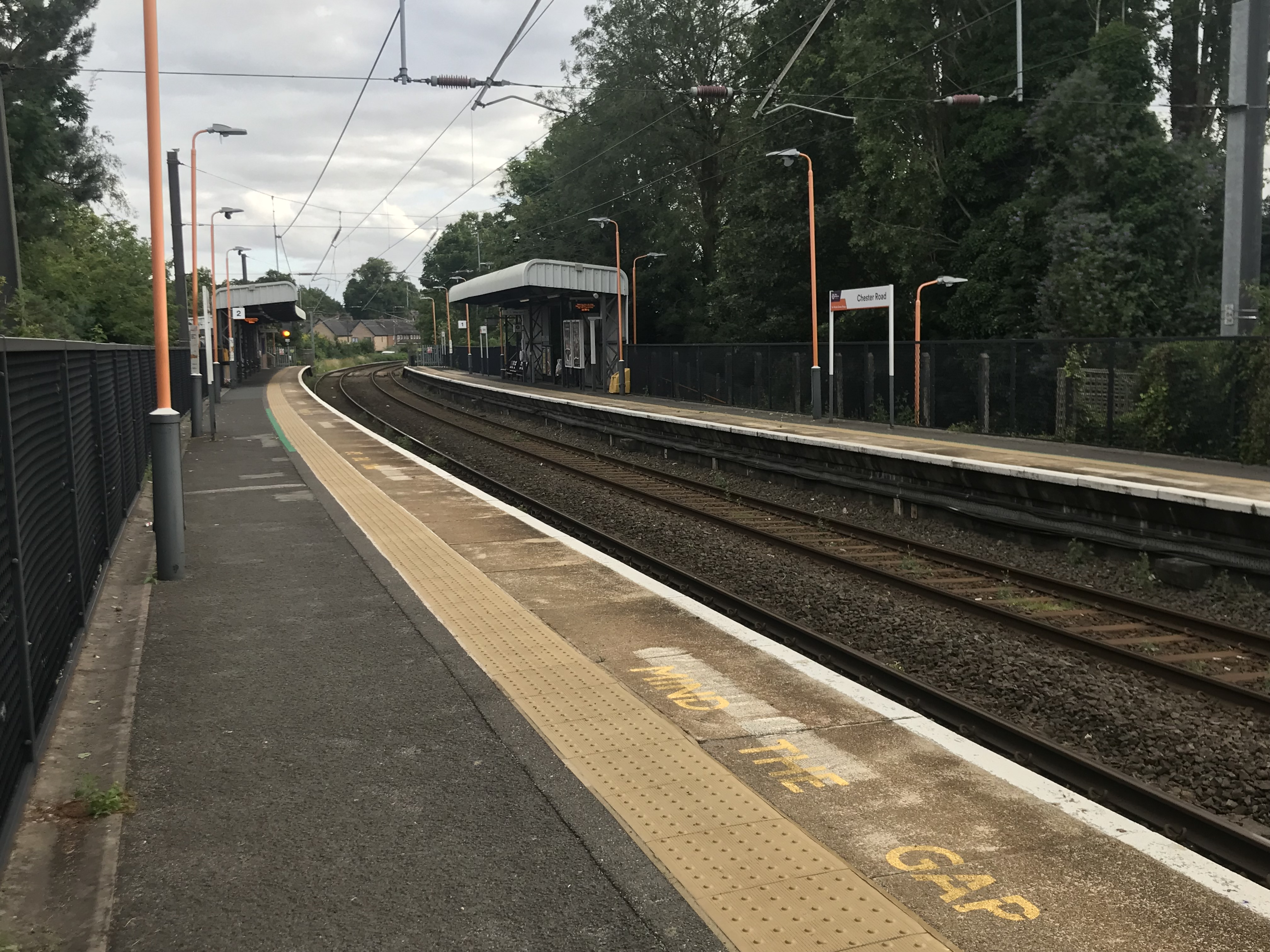
A view of the platforms, looking southbound towards Erdington

Chester Road is a park and ride station. It has a free car park which was expanded to 164 spaces in May 2006. The ticket office is on platform 2, with two ticket machines on site. There is a shelter on both platforms with seating areas.

There are ramps providing step-free access to both platforms at Chester Road. It has been classified as a step-free access category B1 station. This means that there is step-free access to all platforms, but it may include long or steep ramps.

== Services ==
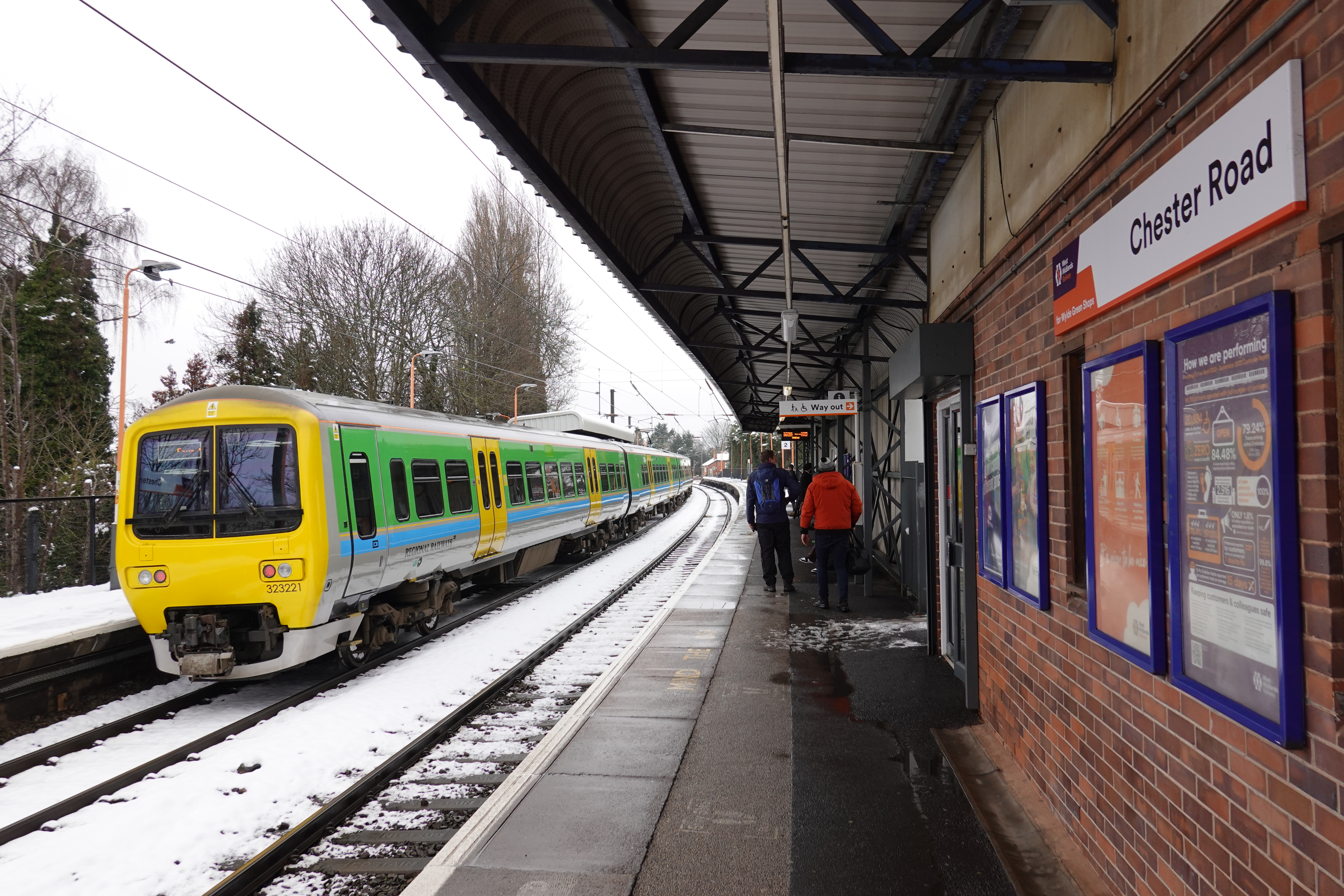
A Centro-liveried West Midlands Railway Class 323 at the station in 2023

The station is served by West Midlands Trains, with local Transport for West Midlands branded Cross-City services. These are operated using Class 730 electric multiple units.

Off-peak services at Chester Road follow this general pattern, in trains per hour (tph):

- 4 tph northbound to Four Oaks, via Sutton Coldfield; departing from platform 1
  - 2 tph continue to Lichfield Trent Valley, via Lichfield City
- 4 tph southbound to Longbridge, via Birmingham New Street and University; departing from platform 2.
  - 2 tph continue to Redditch
  - 2 tph continue to Bromsgrove

On Sundays, there are 2 tph in each direction between Lichfield Trent Valley and Redditch.

The average journey time to Birmingham New Street is around 16 minutes.

Preceding station	National Rail	Following station
Wylde Green	West Midlands Railway; Lichfield – Four Oaks – Birmingham – Bromsgrove/Redditch; Cross-City Line	Erdington
