= Butlers Lane railway station =

Railway station in the West Midlands, England

Coordinates: 52°35′35″N 1°50′20″W

Butlers Lane
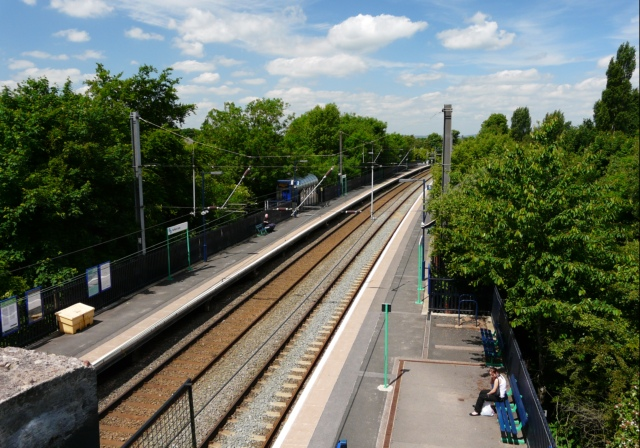

General information
- Location: Four Oaks, Birmingham; England
- Grid reference: SP109994
- Manager: West Midlands Railway
- Transit authority: Transport for West Midlands
- Platforms: 2

Other information
- Station code: BUL
- Fare zone: 5
- Classification: DfT category E

History
- Opened: 1957

Passengers
- 2021/22: ▲0.116 million
- 2022/23: ▲0.142 million
- 2023/24: ▲0.168 million
- 2024/25: ▲0.194 million
- 2025/26: ▲0.218 million
Location
Notes
- Passenger statistics from the Office of Rail and Road

Butlers Lane railway station serves the northern part of the Four Oaks district of Sutton Coldfield, West Midlands, England. It is sited on the Cross-City Line between Bromsgrove/Redditch and Lichfield Trent Valley, via Birmingham New Street. The station, and all trains calling there, are operated by West Midlands Trains.

== History ==
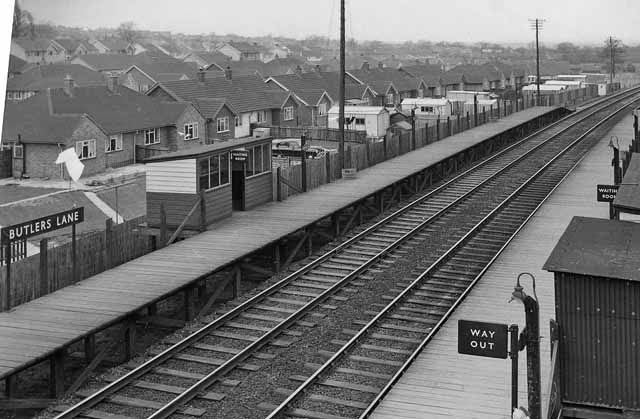
View northward towards Lichfield, in 1962

The station was opened as a temporary wooden station in 1957 by British Railways, to coincide with the introduction of new diesel multiple units on the line from Birmingham New Street to Lichfield. It was known originally as Butlers Lane Halt, despite being staffed from the beginning.

It became one of the stations served by the new Cross-City Line from 1978. The original wooden station was rebuilt as a permanent structure during 1991/92, to coincide with the electrification of the line by British Rail.

== Facilities ==
The station has a staffed ticket office on the southbound platform, open on a part-time basis throughout the week. A self-service ticket machine is also available for use when the office is closed and for collecting pre-paid tickets. Waiting shelters are located on both platforms and train running information is given via CIS displays, timetable posters, automated announcements and two customer help points. No step-free access is possible to either platform, as both entrances from the road above require the use of steps.

== Services ==
The station is served by West Midlands Trains, with local Transport for West Midlands-branded Cross-City services operated by Class 730 electric multiple units.

The off-peak service pattern is as follows:

Mondays to Saturdays:

- 2tph (trains per hour) northbound to Lichfield Trent Valley, via Lichfield City, departing from platform 2.
- 2tph southbound to Bromsgrove, via Sutton Coldfield, Birmingham New Street and University, departing from platform 1.

Sundays:

- 2tph northbound to Lichfield Trent Valley.
- 2tph southbound to Redditch.

Services on Sundays call at all stations between Lichfield T.V. and Redditch.

The average journey time to Birmingham New Street is around 26 minutes.

Preceding station	National Rail	Following station
Blake Street	West Midlands Railway; Lichfield – Birmingham – Bromsgrove/Redditch; Cross-City Line	Four Oaks
