= Blake Street railway station =

Railway station in Birmingham, England

Coordinates: 52.605°N 1.845°W

Blake Street
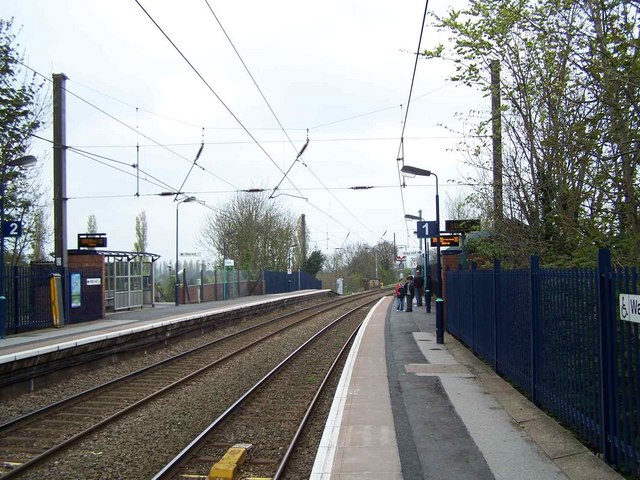

General information
- Location: Hill Hook, Birmingham; England
- Grid reference: SK106007
- Manager: West Midlands Railway
- Transit authority: Transport for West Midlands
- Platforms: 2

Other information
- Station code: BKT
- Fare zone: 5
- Classification: DfT category E

History
- Opened: 1884

Passengers
- 2021/22: ▲0.199 million
- 2022/23: ▲0.264 million
- 2023/24: ▲0.307 million
- 2024/25: ▲0.345 million
- 2025/26: ▲0.415 million
Location
Notes
- Passenger statistics from the Office of Rail and Road

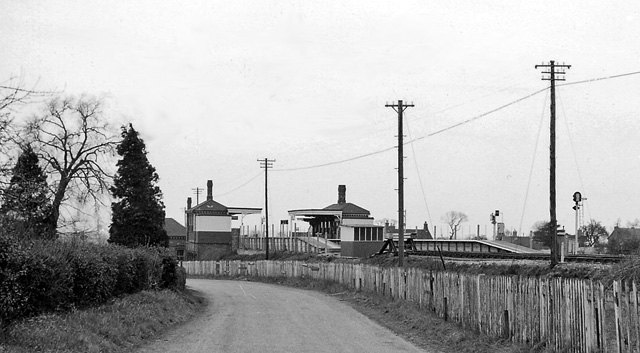
Blake Street Station in 1962

Blake Street railway station serves the Hill Hook area of Sutton Coldfield, Birmingham, England. It is sited on the Cross-City Line between Bromsgrove/Redditch and Lichfield Trent Valley, via Birmingham New Street. The station is located on the county boundary between the West Midlands and Staffordshire. It is managed by West Midlands Trains, who operate all trains serving the station.

== History ==
The station opened in 1884, when the London and North Western Railway extended its Birmingham to Sutton Coldfield line northward to Lichfield. In May 1978, Blake Street became one of the stations on the Cross-City Line, launched by the West Midlands PTE to link the Lichfield branch with the infrequently served suburban line to Kings Norton and Redditch. The northern end was subsequently extended to Lichfield Trent Valley in 1988 and electrified on the 25 kV AC system in 1992. The signalling at the station is set up so that trains from Birmingham can terminate or start from here, but the facility isn't used in the current timetable (only for planned engineering work or in times of disruption).

== Facilities ==
The station has a staffed ticket office on the southbound side at street level, staffed on a part-time basis. A self-service ticket machine (located next to the booking office) is also available for use when the office is closed. At platform level, there is a waiting shelter on the northbound side and a waiting room on the southbound platform. CIS displays, timetable posters, customer help points and automated announcements provide train running information. Step-free access to both platforms is available via ramps from street level.

== Services ==
The station is served by West Midlands Trains with local Transport for West Midlands branded "Cross-City" services, currently operated using Class 730 Electric multiple units (EMUs).

The off-peak service pattern is as follows:

Mondays to Saturdays:

- 2tph northbound to Lichfield Trent Valley via Lichfield City, departing from Platform 1.
- 2tph southbound to Bromsgrove via Sutton Coldfield, Birmingham New Street and University, departing from Platform 2.

Sundays:

- 2tph northbound to Lichfield Trent Valley.
- 2tph southbound to Redditch.

Services on Sundays call at all stations between Lichfield T.V. and Redditch.

The average journey time to Birmingham New Street is around 29 minutes.

Preceding station	National Rail	Following station
Shenstone	West Midlands Railway; Lichfield – Birmingham – Bromsgrove/Redditch; Cross-City Line	Butlers Lane
Terminus	West Midlands Railway; Lichfield – Birmingham – Bromsgrove/Redditch; Cross-City Line	Butlers Lane
