= Cross-City Line =

Railway line in the West Midlands, England

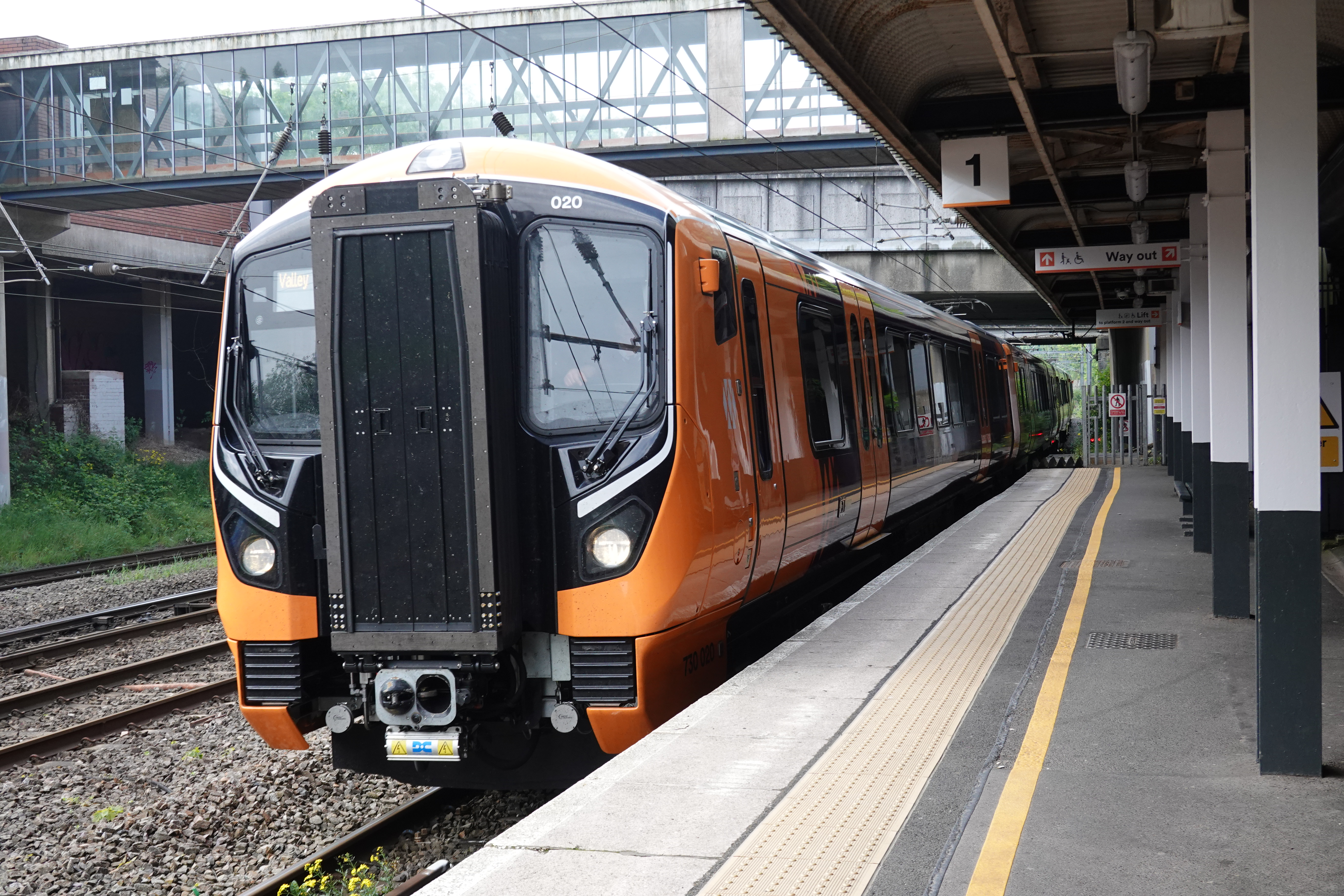
- West Midlands Railway Class 730 arriving at Longbridge in 2024

Overview
- Status: Operational
- Owner: Network Rail
- Locale: West Midlands
- Termini: Lichfield Trent Valley; Redditch, Bromsgrove
- Stations: 25

Service
- Type: Heavy rail, Suburban rail
- System: National Rail
- Operator: West Midlands Railway
- Depot: Soho
- Rolling stock: Class 730

History
- Opened: 1978

Technical
- Line length: 32 mi (51 km)
- Number of tracks: 2 (Lichfield – Bromsgrove); 1 (Barnt Green – Redditch)
- Track gauge: 4 ft 8 1/2 in (1,435 mm) standard gauge
- Electrification: 25 kV AC OHLE
Route map
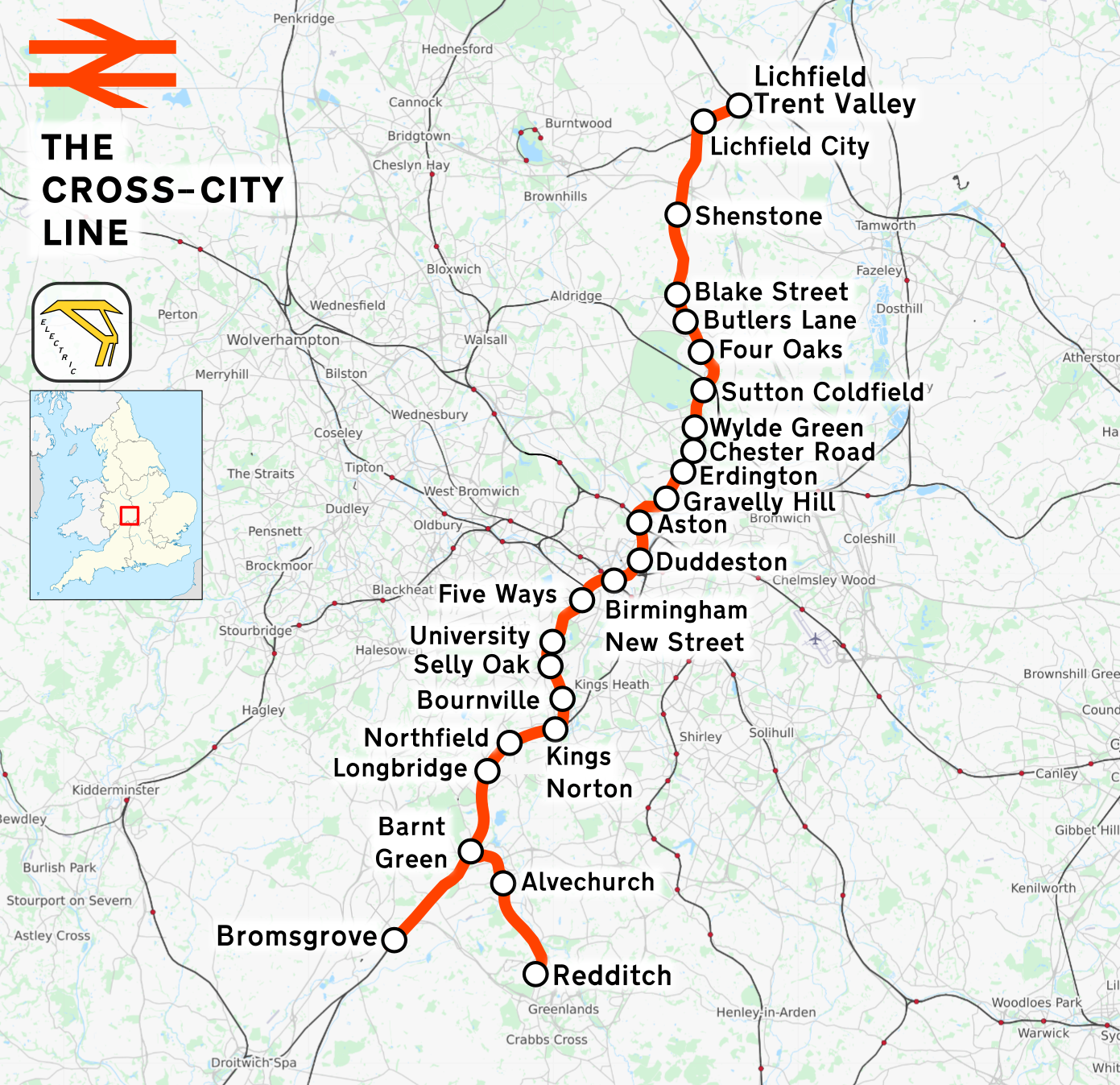

The Cross-City Line is a suburban rail line in the West Midlands region of England. It runs for 32 mi (51 km) from Redditch and Bromsgrove in Worcestershire, its two southern termini, to Lichfield, Staffordshire, its northern terminus, via Birmingham New Street, connecting the suburbs of Birmingham in between. Services are operated by West Midlands Railway.

Cross-City Line services began in 1978, as a project of the West Midlands Passenger Transport Executive (WMPTE) to improve local rail services. It made use of pre-existing railways lines, which previously did not have any through services. Services were extended to Redditch in 1980, and to Lichfield Trent Valley in 1988. The route was electrified in 1993. In 2018, services were extended to Bromsgrove, which was added as a second southern terminus.

== History ==
=== Constituent railways ===
What is now the Cross-City Line was not built as a single route; it is a combination of lines opened by different companies at different times between 1837 and 1885.

On the northern half of the route (Birmingham–Lichfield):

London and North Western Railway (Sutton Coldfield Branch) Act 1859
- Act of Parliament
- Parliament of the United Kingdom
- Long title: An Act for making a Railway from the London and North-western Railway to Sutton Coldfield in the County of Warwick, with a Branch therefrom; and for other Purposes.
- Citation: 22 & 23 Vict. c. lxxxviii

Dates
- Royal assent: 8 August 1859

London and North Western Railway (Sutton Coldfield and Lichfield) Act 1880
- Act of Parliament
- Parliament of the United Kingdom
- Long title: An Act for empowering the London and North-western Railway Company to construct a new railway to be called the Sutton Coldfield and Lichfield Railway; and for other purposes.
- Citation: 43 & 44 Vict. c. x

Dates
- Royal assent: 29 June 1880

Text of statute as originally enacted

- The oldest section is between Duddeston (originally named Vauxhall) and Aston, which was part of the Grand Junction Railway from Birmingham to Earlestown, opened in 1837. This was extended towards the centre of Birmingham, at Curzon Street, the following year, and into Birmingham New Street in 1854.
- The line from Aston to Sutton Coldfield was opened by the London and North Western Railway in 1862, and extended to Lichfield City in 1884, where it connected with the South Staffordshire line between Walsall and Lichfield Trent Valley, which had opened in 1849.

On the southern half of the route (Birmingham–Redditch):

- The Birmingham and Gloucester Railway had opened in 1840, following what is now the Cross-City Line between Bromsgrove and Kings Norton, although this line ran to Curzon Street (later New Street) via what is now the Camp Hill line.
- The single-track branch line from Barnt Green to Redditch followed in 1859, as part of the Midland Railway's Gloucester Loop Line, which was closed south of Redditch in 1964.
- The Birmingham West Suburban Railway, taking the route of the Cross-City Line between Kings Norton and central Birmingham via Bournville, opened to its original terminus at Granville Street in 1876, it was extended into Birmingham New Street in 1885, and the Granville Street terminus closed.

These lines from Birmingham to Barnt Green and Redditch were operated by the Midland Railway and the line to Lichfield was operated by the London and North Western Railway, so there were no through services. This continued despite the Grouping of the LNW and Midland Railways to form the London Midland and Scottish Railway in 1921, and subsequent nationalisation to form British Railways.

Prior to the creation of the Cross-City Line, the northern half of the route from New Street to Sutton Coldfield and Lichfield had a well used regular suburban service, which had been switched from steam to diesel multiple unit (DMU) operation in 1956, leading to a large increase in usage. However, the southern half of the route from New Street to Redditch was a different matter: In 1964, the closure of all the stations between New Street and Redditch (along with the branch to Redditch) was proposed by the Beeching Axe. They were reprieved from closure in 1967; however, the service was cut back to a handful of trains at peak times for commuters.

=== 1978: consolidated route ===
In the early-1970s, the West Midlands Passenger Transport Executive (WMPTE) gained responsibility for managing and planning the local railway network in the West Midlands, and they set about looking for ways it could be improved: The WMPTE Passenger Transport Plan of 1972 recognised the need for a cross-city rail service, and especially an improved service to the south of Birmingham with new stations to serve the growth areas in the south of the city.

The Cross City Line project was sanctioned by the WMPTE in May 1975 and launched on 8 May 1978. Costing £7.4 million (equivalent to £57,480,000 in 2025), it involved joining the services into Birmingham from north and south into a single through service, along with the re-opening of Five Ways station (the original had closed in 1944 as a wartime economy measure) and new stations to serve the University of Birmingham and Longbridge (the former station at Longbridge was on the branch line to Halesowen and Old Hill). Most of the other stations on the southern half of the route were rebuilt at the same time, and improvements were made to signalling and junctions. Of the new stations, the only one to be officially opened was University, which the then Secretary of State for Transport Bill Rodgers MP formally opened on 8 May 1978. There is a plaque on platform 2 marking this occasion.

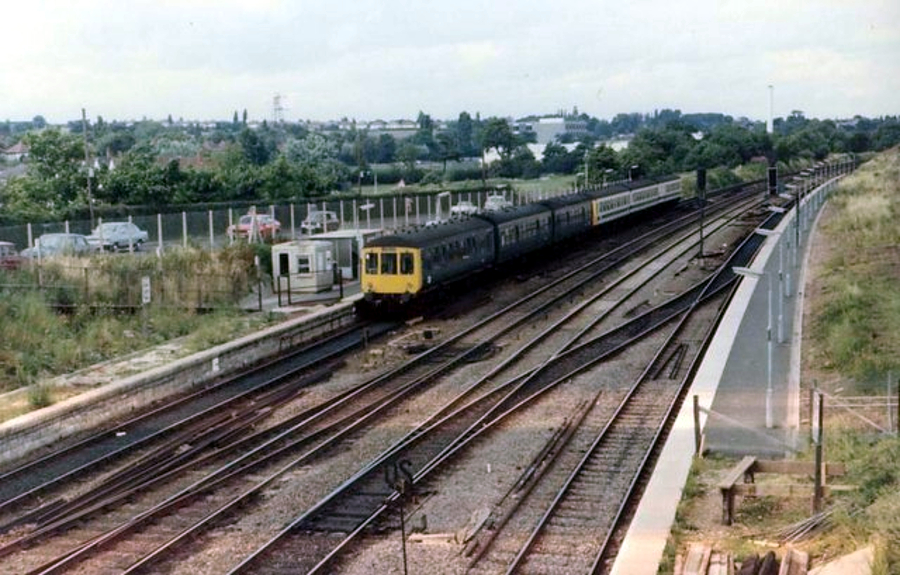
Longbridge railway station in 1979, still unfinished having opened the previous year. At this time diesel multiple units operated the service.

Services initially ran on a 15-minute frequency between Longbridge and Four Oaks via Birmingham New Street, with an hourly extension to Lichfield City, using refurbished Class 116 diesel multiple units. The new service was an instant success, and by the end of the first year was carrying 30,000 passengers daily.

=== 1980s developments ===
Services were extended to Redditch in 1980, initially on an hourly frequency, increased to half-hourly in 1989. The service to Lichfield City was increased to half hourly in 1986, and on 28 November 1988, some services were extended to terminate at the re-opened high level platforms of Lichfield Trent Valley.

=== 1990s: Electrification ===
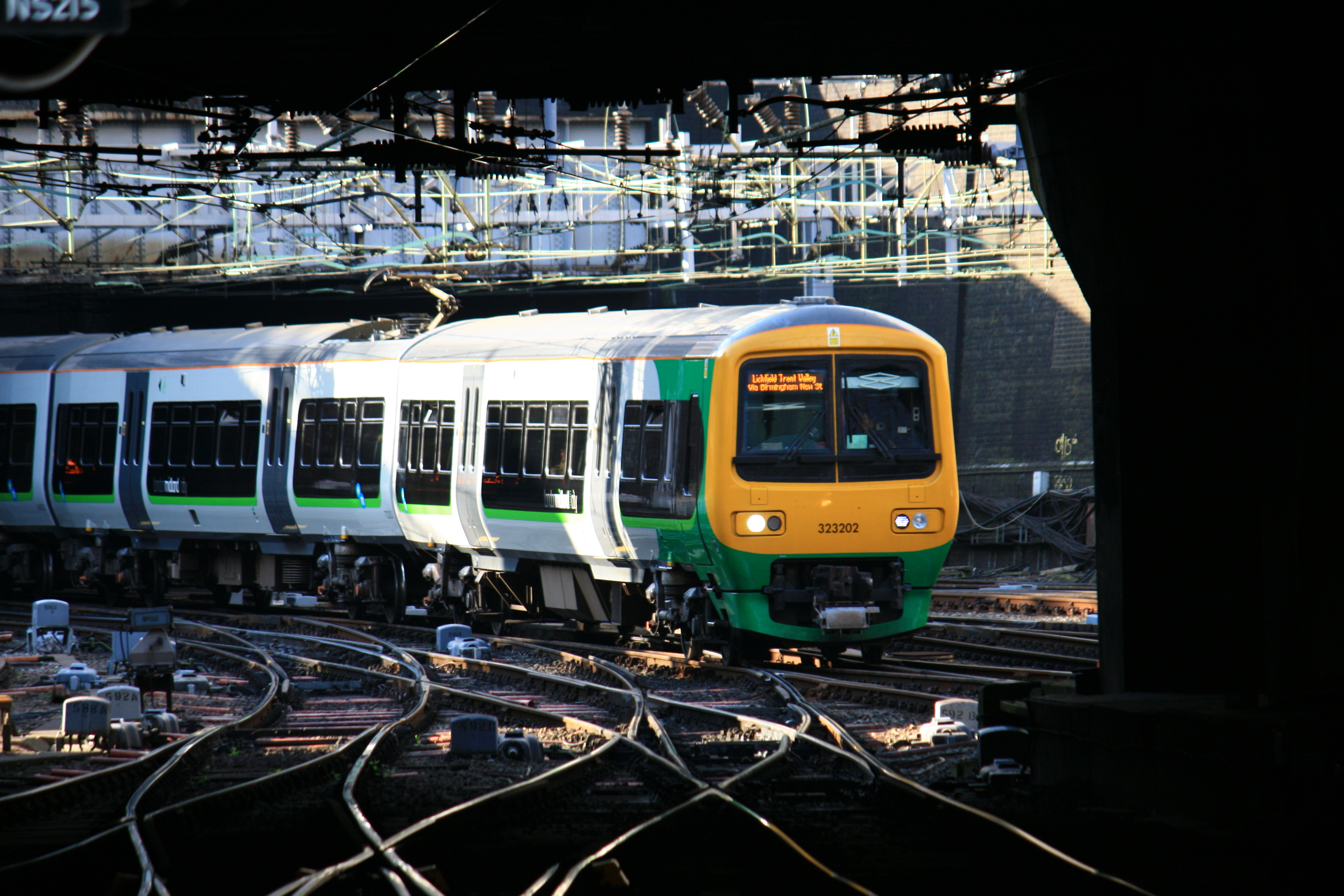
London Midland Class 323 arriving at Birmingham New Street in 2009

By the late-1980s, the elderly diesels operating the service were becoming increasingly unreliable, and the WMPTE (now reorganised as Transport for West Midlands, formerly Centro) pressed for electrification. The decision to electrify the line was made on 7 February 1990 by the then Transport Minister Cecil Parkinson during the campaign for a by-election in the Mid Staffordshire constituency.

Work started on electrifying the route with the 25 kV AC overhead line system in May 1990, and it was completed on 6 June 1993. Redditch, Alvechurch, and Blake Street stations were rebuilt at this time, and several other stations including Barnt Green were extensively modified to accommodate the new longer electric trains. The signalling was also modernised at the same time as the electrification, as part of a parallel scheme. A new fleet of Class 323 Electric multiple units were introduced to work the electrified line, and replace the elderly diesels. Full service with the Class 323s did not begin until 1994, due to initial reliability problems with the new units. Some elderly Class 304, Class 308 and Class 310 EMUs were drafted in to operate services in the interim, along with some of the original diesel units.

The cost of the electrification scheme was estimated at £64.5 million (equivalent to £138,810,000 in 2025), of which around 70% was funded by Centro, and the remainder by the Regional Railways sector of British Rail.

=== 21st century developments ===
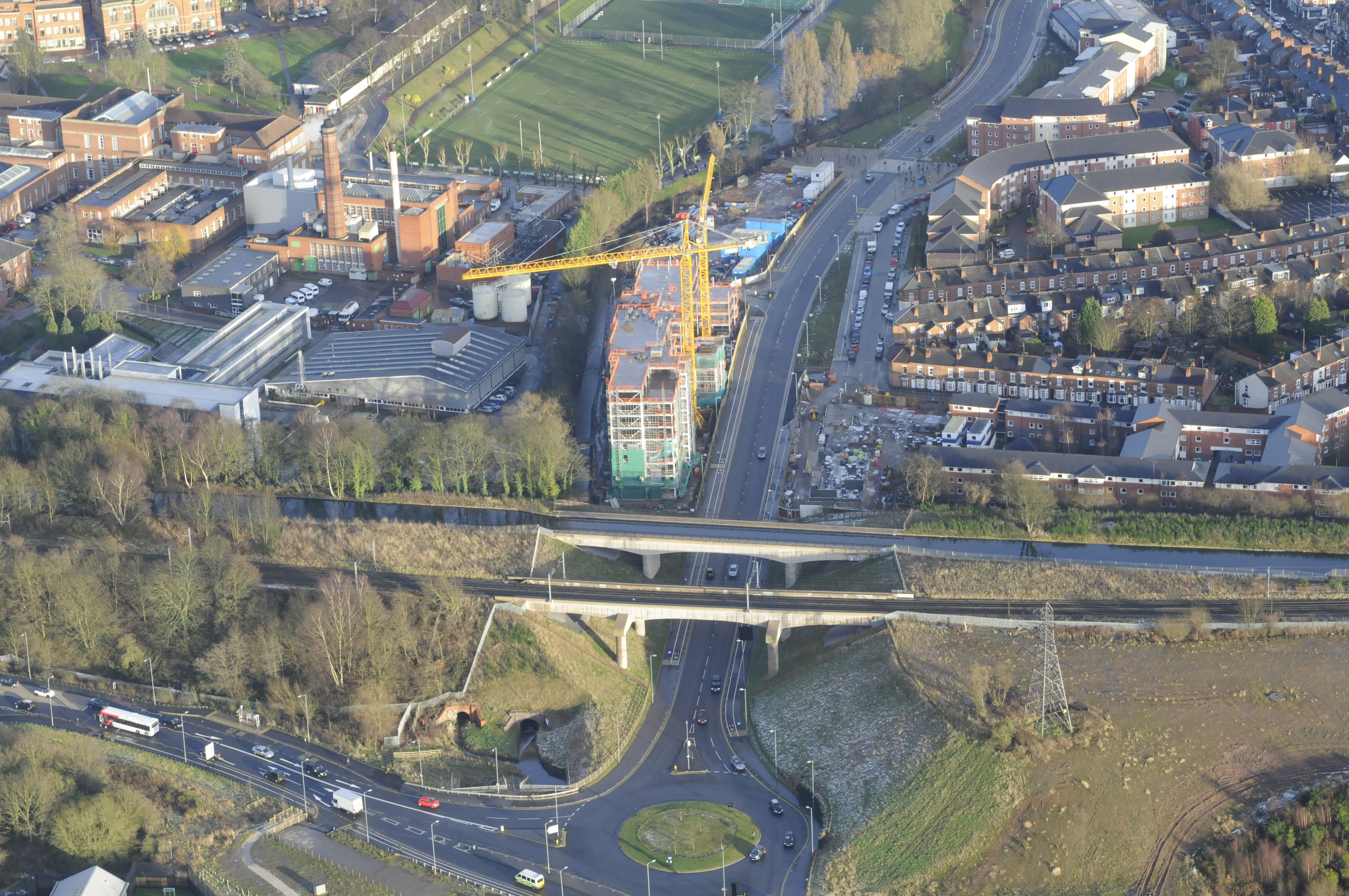
Aerial view of the new railway bridge (nearest to camera) and aqueduct over the diverted A38, taken in January 2013

At Selly Oak, a new bridge was constructed in 2011 to carry the railway over a new section of the A38.

The single track between Barnt Green and Redditch restricted the number of trains that could run to Redditch to two per hour. In November 2013 a scheme was approved to construct a new passing loop at Alvechurch to allow the service to be increased to three trains per hour. The line between Barnt Green and Redditch was closed for eight weeks for the works to be carried out, and was reopened on 1 September 2014. The improved service began in December 2014.

Electrification was also extended from Barnt Green to Bromsgrove station, which was rebuilt in 2016 and was added as a second southern terminus once electrification was completed in August 2018. These changes allowed three trains per hour to run to both Redditch and Bromsgrove.

Three of the ten new Class 350 trains that London Midland introduced in 2014 displaced Class 323s on other routes in the West Midlands to enable an increase in capacity between Longbridge and Redditch, and the extension of all remaining Longbridge trains to Bromsgrove after electrification. Class 350s are not currently authorised to be used on the Cross City Line.

Post-pandemic the Cross-City Line weekday service has been reduced from 6 to 4 trains per hour in each direction usually operated by two sets of Class 730s, forming 6 cars. 6 trains per hour are expected to be reintroduced as part of Midlands Rail Hub. The Class 323s were finally withdrawn from the line after 30 years of service, on 27 September 2024. As part of the new West Midlands Trains franchise, they were replaced by Class 730 Aventras.

Passenger service on the Camp Hill line, which diverges from the Cross-City Line at Kings Norton, were reintroduced on 7 April 2026 after a gap of over 80 years.

== Current services ==
In the December 2024 timetable, the off-peak weekday and Saturday service on the core section of the line between Four Oaks and Longbridge comprises four West Midlands Railway trains per hour in each direction. Two northbound trains per hour continue from Four Oaks to Lichfield Trent Valley while two southbound trains per hour continue from Barnt Green to Redditch, and the other two southbound trains per hour continue to Bromsgrove.

The service consists of:

- 2tph from Lichfield Trent Valley to Bromsgrove
- 2tph from Four Oaks to Redditch

Between Birmingham New Street and Barnt Green, the Cross-City Line is contiguous with the Cross Country Route. Some longer distance services stop at University, including CrossCountry trains to Cardiff and West Midlands Railway trains to Hereford.

Tracks are also shared with the Chase Line between Birmingham New Street and Aston.

== Future ==
In October 2018, as part of a 30-year strategy of Transport in the West Midlands several proposals were put forward. By 2034, there would be longer trains, electrification of the line from Lichfield Trent Valley to Burton-on-Trent allowing 2 services per hour to be extended to Burton-on-Trent via a newly reopened Alrewas. Beyond 2034, it was proposed that new semi-fast service could serve more larger stations.

There is also a single tracked mothballed line to the former Anglesey Sidings which was in use until 2001. The line remains in situ but rusty beyond repair. There is a possibility that the line which connected to Walsall from Lichfield via Brownhills and Pelsall could reopen as Mayor of the West Midlands Andy Street promised to look and make the reopening of the line feasible. West Midlands Combined Authority also released a plan for the line as part of a 10-year transport plan called the 2026 Delivery for Transport.

== Passenger volume ==
In 2021–22, the Cross-City Line's 24 stations (excluding New Street) had combined passenger numbers of 12.4 million, The busiest station on the route besides Birmingham New Street is University, with 3.05 million passenger entries and exits, and the least busy station is Alvechurch with 151,042 passenger entries and exits in 2023/24.

Station usage
Station name	2002–03	2004–05	2005–06	2006–07	2007–08	2008–09	2009–10	2010–11	2011–12	2012–13	2013–14	2014–15	2015–16	2016–17	2017–18	2018–19	2019–20	2020–21	2021–22	2022–23	2023–24	2024–25
Lichfield Trent Valley to Birmingham New Street
Lichfield Trent Valley	0.183	0.187	0.222	0.231	0.248	0.704	0.743	0.821	0.899	0.912	0.969	0.982	1.064	1.101	1.093	1.094	1.104	0.179	0.595	0.688	0.727	
Lichfield City	0.529	0.579	0.590	0.608	0.636	0.561	0.624	0.607	0.621	0.638	0.643	0.685	0.680	0.712	0.798	0.862	0.828	0.197	0.488	0.633	0.751	
Shenstone	0.089	0.114	0.126	0.133	0.151	0.143	0.203	0.189	0.160	0.181	0.174	0.179	0.177	0.191	0.200	0.175	0.179	0.062	0.092	0.130	0.142	
Blake Street	0.154	0.168	0.172	0.176	0.184	0.339	0.332	0.326	0.313	0.307	0.338	0.344	0.378	0.380	0.382	0.435	0.427	0.066	0.199	0.264		
Butlers Lane		0.092	0.093	0.096	0.103	0.197	0.193	0.186	0.189	0.186	0.202	0.206	0.222	0.230	0.232	0.254	0.246	0.042	0.116	0.142		
Four Oaks		0.225	0.235	0.251	0.277	0.538	0.541	0.548	0.581	0.585	0.623	0.640	0.701	0.750	0.750	0.823	0.805	0.121	0.377	0.498		
Sutton Coldfield		0.512	0.542	0.578	0.634	1.183	1.185	1.185	1.377	1.368	1.429	1.475	1.573	1.609	1.624	1.776	1.720	0.313	0.645	0.805		
Wylde Green		0.199	0.212	0.224	0.435	0.435	0.441	0.439	0.488	0.493	0.522	0.537	0.586	0.606	0.619	0.678	0.668	0.113	0.302	0.389		
Chester Road		0.245	0.251	0.267	0.296	0.537	0.564	0.598	0.748	0.763	0.799	0.816	0.882	0.909	0.925	1.048	1.050	0.152	0.390	0.489		
Erdington		0.267	0.299	0.299	0.336	0.552	0.576	0.584	0.815	0.797	0.831	0.826	0.884	0.923	0.930	1.052	1.030	0.160	0.329	0.397		
Gravelly Hill		0.166	0.183	0.200	0.231	0.404	0.403	0.402	0.636	0.631	0.684	0.684	0.736	0.769	0.772	0.908	0.912	0.138	0.279	0.357		
Aston		0.162	0.163	0.168	0.206	0.341	0.345	0.336	0.445	0.438	0.484	0.484	0.533	0.525	0.554	0.658	0.683	0.129	0.388	0.555		
Duddeston		0.050	0.052	0.056	0.060	0.135	0.138	0.141	0.180	0.182	0.190	0.189	0.218	0.245	0.257	0.343	0.408	0.116	0.242	0.385		
Birmingham New Street		16.244	17.303	14.525	17.007	25.192	25.268	24.687	31.213	32.090	34.748	35.313	39.077	42.367	44.380	47.928	46.511	7.351	22.683	30.726		
Birmingham New Street to Redditch and Bromsgrove
Five Ways		0.450	0.480	0.514	0.564	0.990	1.043	1.050	1.345	1.350	1.447	1.453	1.586	1.661	1.776	2.301	2.497	0.564	1.171	1.459		
University	0.785	0.968	1.061	1.191	1.251	1.978	2.063	2.158	2.595	2.636	2.845	2.977	3.206	3.384	3.475	3.970	3.975	0.731	1.961	2.633	3.051	
Selly Oak		0.800	0.897	1.024	1.113	1.578	1.598	1.569	2.270	2.278	2.407	2.433	2.671	2.805	2.848	3.296	3.274	0.631	1.590	1.995		
Bournville		0.342	0.375	0.406	0.467	0.764	0.773	0.786	0.983	0.976	1.028	1.034	1.106	1.167	1.183	1.331	1.319	0.200	0.511	0.702		
Kings Norton		0.366	0.407	0.447	0.481	0.812	0.785	0.793	1.102	1.092	1.142	1.146	1.237	1.290	1.317	1.509	1.512	0.231	0.537	0.676		
Northfield		0.272	0.296	0.306	0.333	0.587	0.565	0.589	0.743	0.739	0.775	0.777	0.845	0.863	0.873	0.989	0.981	0.173	0.392	0.489		
Longbridge		0.292	0.316	0.343	0.373	0.628	0.625	0.638	0.751	0.743	0.797	0.832	0.919	0.963	0.974	1.093	1.029	0.239	0.525	0.686		
Barnt Green		0.128	0.154	0.160	0.171	0.217	0.221	0.231	0.256	0.249	0.260	0.251	0.270	0.285	0.303	0.305	0.315	0.072	0.193	0.246		
Alvechurch	0.068	0.077	0.094	0.094	0.094	0.135	0.138	0.138	0.161	0.151	0.159	0.145	0.167	0.189	0.198	0.200	0.180	0.032	0.091	0.124	0.151	
Redditch		0.592	0.631	0.662	0.689	0.847	0.860	0.900	0.953	0.993	0.942	0.861	1.002	1.033	1.078	1.060	1.002	0.210	0.581	0.685		
Bromsgrove																0.753	0.790	0.133	0.415	0.513		
The annual passenger usage is based on sales of tickets in stated financial years from Office of Rail and Road estimates of station usage. The statistics are for passengers arriving and departing from each station and cover twelve-month periods that start in April. Methodology may vary year on year. Usage since the period 2019–20 have been affected by the COVID-19 pandemic, especially the period 2020–23.

== Route description ==
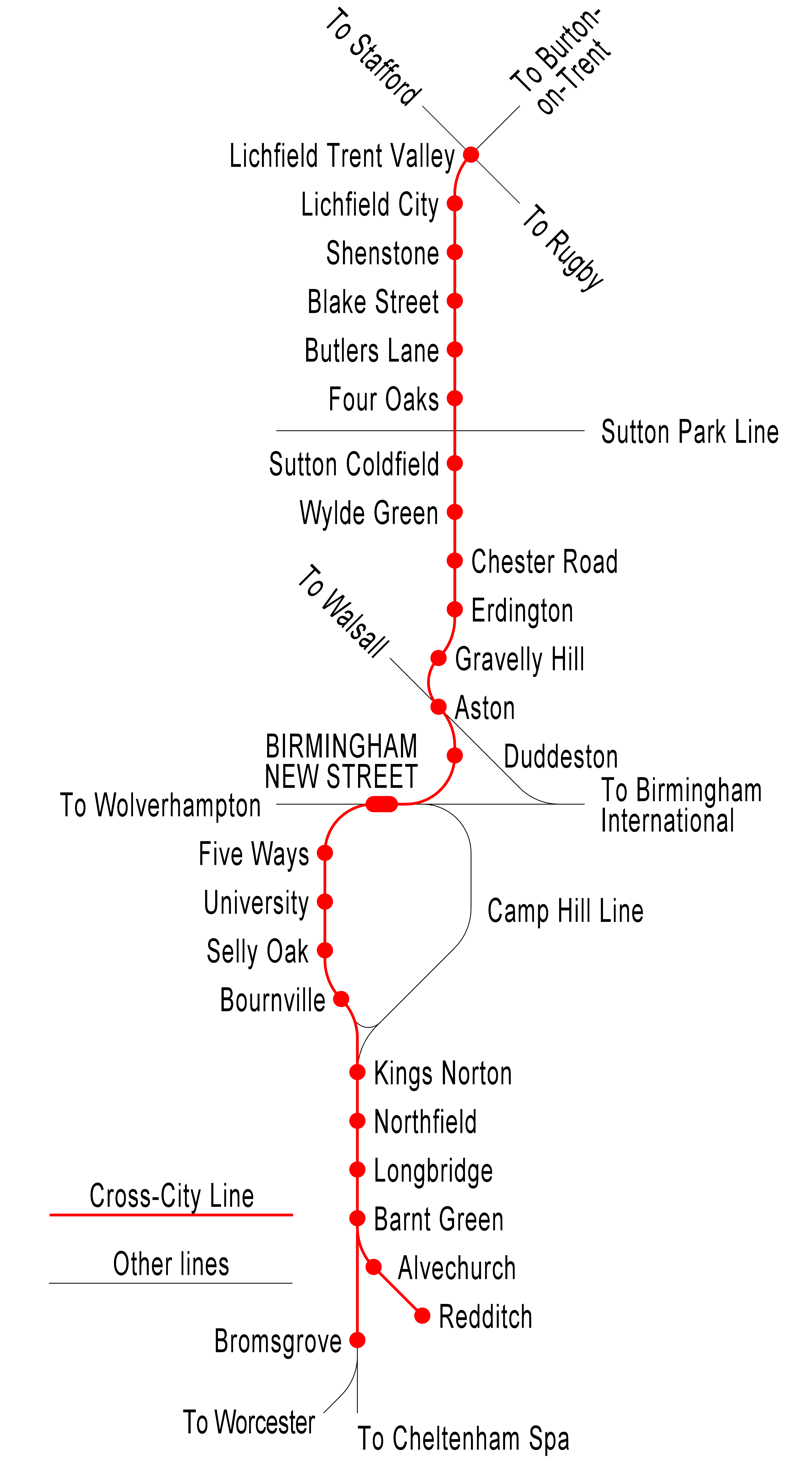
Diagram of route

The railway stations and cities, towns and villages served by the line are listed below.

- Lichfield Trent Valley – on the outskirts of Lichfield, with connections to London Northwestern Railway services along the Trent Valley line between London Euston and Crewe
- Lichfield City railway station – in central Lichfield
- Shenstone railway station in Shenstone, Staffordshire
- Blake Street railway station in Hill Hook, Sutton Coldfield
- Butlers Lane railway station in Four Oaks
- Four Oaks railway station in Four Oaks, Sutton Coldfield
- Sutton Coldfield railway station in Sutton Coldfield
- Wylde Green railway station serving Wylde Green and Boldmere
- Chester Road railway station Pype Hayes, Erdington and Wylde Green
- Erdington railway station in Erdington
- Gravelly Hill railway station in Gravelly Hill
- Aston railway station in Aston – the Walsall Line diverges here
- Duddeston railway station in Duddeston
- Birmingham New Street railway station in Birmingham City Centre
- Five Ways railway station in Five Ways, Birmingham
- University railway station serving the University of Birmingham and Queen Elizabeth Hospital
- Selly Oak railway station in Selly Oak
- Bournville railway station in Bournville
- Kings Norton railway station in Kings Norton and Cotteridge
- Northfield railway station in Northfield, Birmingham
- Longbridge railway station in Longbridge
- Barnt Green railway station in Barnt Green – branches off the main line to Cheltenham here.
- Alvechurch railway station in Alvechurch
- Redditch railway station in Redditch
- Bromsgrove railway station in Bromsgrove

A large stretch of the northern part of the line closely follows the A5127 road.

== Media ==
- In 1990, Railscene produced a driver's eye view of the then-diesel line, featuring the elderly rolling stock still in operation. Many features of the line have since been changed, for example, the rebuilding of Alvechurch and Redditch stations, the abolition of Lichfield City's goods sidings and closure of the Brownhills Line and the removal of the fourth platform of Lichfield Trent Valley.
- There was a highly publicised opening ceremony to celebrate the electrification and service enhancement at Redditch in 1993.
- In 1995, Video 125 released a video of a driver's eye view of the recently electrified line, narrated by Kay Alexander. On the video near Lichfield an elderly Class 304 unit is used on the opposite direction service – this was due to not all 323 units being in traffic in time for the new services starting.
- A full replica of the Cross-City line was released for the Train Simulator franchise in March 2021 and on Train Sim World 3 in November 2022 by Dovetail Games, both featuring the Class 323.
- There is a highly detailed reproduction of the part between Redditch and Birmingham New Street for the free train simulators BVE and OpenBVE.

== See also ==
- Transport in Birmingham
- Camp Hill line

== Bibliography ==
- Boynton, John (1993). Rails Across The City, The Story of The Birmingham Cross City Line. Kidderminster: Mid England Books. ISBN 0-9522248-0-1.
