= Alvechurch =

Village and civil parish in Worcestershire, England

Coordinates: 52.35056°N 1.96472°W

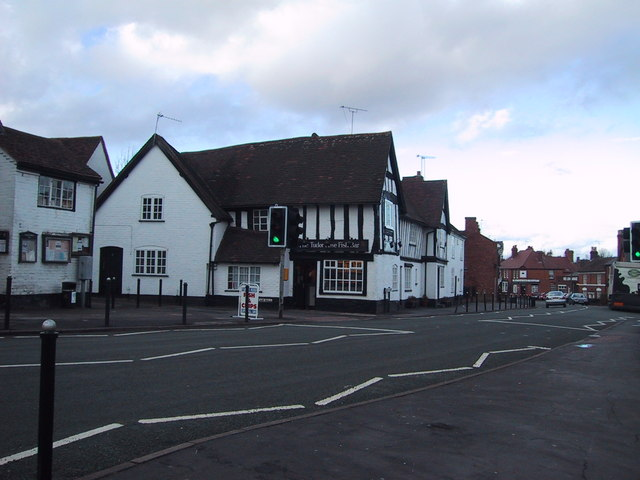
- Tudor Rose Fish Bar, Alvechurch

- Location within Worcestershire
- Population: 6,564
- OS grid reference: SP025725
  - London: 99 miles (159 km)
- Civil parish: Alvechurch
- District: Bromsgrove
- Shire county: Worcestershire
- Region: West Midlands
- Country: England
- Sovereign state: United Kingdom
- Post town: BIRMINGHAM
- Postcode district: B48
- Dialling code: 0121
- Police: West Mercia
- Fire: Hereford and Worcester
- Ambulance: West Midlands
- UK Parliament: Bromsgrove

Alvechurch (/ˈælvtʃɜːrtʃ/ ALV-church) is a village and civil parish in the Bromsgrove district in Worcestershire, England. It is located in the valley of the River Arrow. The Lickey Hills Country Park is 3 miles (5 kilometres) to the northwest. It is 11 miles (18 kilometres) south of Birmingham, 5 mi (8 km) north of Redditch and 6 mi (10 km) east of Bromsgrove. At the 2001 census, the population was 5,316.

== History ==
Alvechurch means "Ælfgyth's church". In the eighth century, Ælfgyth founded a church on the site of the church of St. Laurence.

King Offa of Mercia gave the land forming the parish to Bishops of Worcester in 780. The parish is mentioned in the Domesday Book of 1068 as Alvievecherche with a small population of under 20 people. In the thirteenth century the Bishop of Worcester built a palace in the village, and a weekly market and an annual fair were established.

The Bishop's Palace was pulled down in the seventeenth century, the only remnants being part of the moat and a yew tree which formerly stood in the palace grounds.

From the nineteenth century to the mid-twentieth century there was a brick factory in the hamlet of Withybed on the edge of the village. Other local industries included nail and needle making. Dellow cars were made in Alvechurch between 1949 and 1956.

== Architecture ==
The village has a number of medieval half-timbered buildings, as well as many Georgian, Edwardian and Victorian buildings.

The church of St Laurence dates back to 1239. It is situated on high ground, and was probably the site of an earlier Mercian church, although nothing remains of the earlier wooden building. Much of the church was rebuilt between 1858 and 1861 by William Butterfield. There is a 1,348-pipe organ. The tower has a peal of eight bells, rung regularly by the North Worcestershire and District Change Ringing Association. The Ark, a £1m extension to the church was built in 2005 despite a village referendum in February 2004 voting against the erection of the building.

There are also many newer residential buildings and a First and Middle school with library. In 2008 a new first and middle school were built north-east of the village, the old school has since been demolished and the new estate has road names commemorating the house names of the school.

== Arts and entertainment ==
There is an Arts and Crafts style Baptist church in the centre of the village.

The Alvechurch Drama Society produces two plays per year at the village hall.

Alvechurch Sports and Social Club hosts live music.

== Sport ==
Alvechurch F.C. was founded in 1929 and played in the local park prior to a move to Lye Meadow. The club folded in November 1993, but was resurrected by a group of supporters in 1994.

The village also has a cricket team.

== Travel and transport ==
The M42 motorway runs across the north side of the village; the nearest junction is north of the village at Hopwood, junction 2.

Alvechurch railway station, opened in 1859, is on the Cross-City Line. It provides local trains to Redditch and Lichfield via Birmingham. The station is unstaffed. On 1 September 2014, a passing loop and second platform were completed and officially opened.

The village is on the Worcester and Birmingham Canal (built 1789), and has a marina.

The A441 road used to pass through the village, but now a relief road by-passes the village, helping to reduce traffic and pollution. Recently, specific traffic-calming measures have been added to the village's main thoroughfares. These 'pinch-points' reduce the road width to one raised central lane, preventing drivers from speeding and promoting considerate road use.

== Notable people ==
- Tracie Andrews, who murdered Lee Harvey in 1996 in a high-profile case that Andrews initially blamed on a 'road rage' killer.
- Godfrey Baseley, creator of The Archers.
- Digby Jones, Baron Jones of Birmingham; his parents owned a shop in the village.
- Alan Smith, who scored the winning goal for Arsenal in the 1994 Cup Winners' Cup final played for Alvechurch F.C.
- Fay Weldon, a novelist.
