= Hill Hook =

Area of Sutton Coldfield, Birmingham, England

Coordinates: 52.5982°N 1.8462°W

Hill Hook is an area of Sutton Coldfield, Birmingham, England.

The area includes Hill Hook Local Nature Reserve, declared in 2003 with an area of 5.65 hectares, which is on the site of a watermill built in the 17th century. An earlier dam showed the extent of the original mill pool, which was enlarged in 1767. The nature reserve, known locally as 'The Meddies' or 'The Mill Pond' was substantially built upon from the early 1980s onwards, although small parts remain untouched. The Friends of Hill Hook, a local group of The Wildlife Trust for Birmingham and the Black Country work alongside the Council ranger Service to care for the site.

It is approximately one mile from Sutton Park. The area is served by Blake Street railway station, and is served also by National Express West Midlands route X3.
