= Alvechurch railway station =

Railway station in Worcestershire, England

Coordinates: 52.346°N 1.968°W

Alvechurch
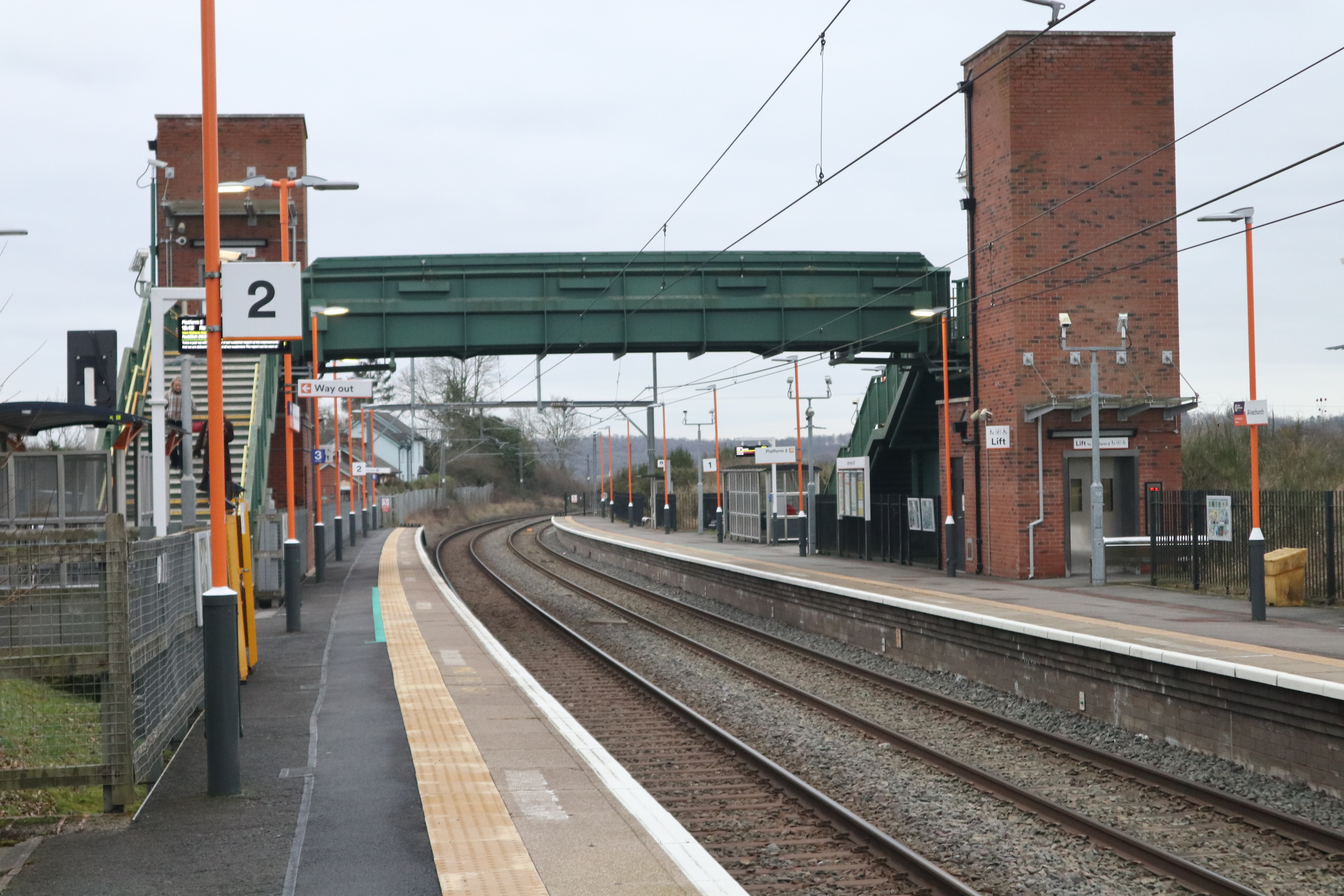
- Alvechurch station in 2025

General information
- Location: Alvechurch, Worcestershire; England
- Grid reference: SP022719
- Manager: West Midlands Railway
- Platforms: 2

Other information
- Station code: ALV
- Classification: DfT category F1

History
- Opened: 1 November 1859

Passengers
- 2021/22: ▲91,124
- 2022/23: ▲0.124 million
- 2023/24: ▲0.151 million
- 2024/25: ▲0.163 million
- 2025/26: ▲0.171 million
Location
Notes
- Passenger statistics from the Office of Rail and Road

Alvechurch railway station serves the village of Alvechurch in north Worcestershire, England. It is on the Cross-City Line 11 1/4 miles (18 km) southwest of Birmingham New Street. The station, and all trains serving it, are operated by West Midlands Trains. The station is unstaffed.

Originally a single platform station on a single-track line, a second platform was added during 2014 when a new passing loop was constructed on the line through the station, in order to allow a more frequent service.

== Services ==
The station is served by West Midlands Trains with local Transport for West Midlands branded "Cross-City" services, operated using Class 323 Electric multiple units (EMUs) until September 2024 and currently by Class 730 EMUs.

The off-peak service pattern is as follows:

Mondays to Saturdays:

- 2 trains per hour (tph) northbound to Four Oaks via University, Birmingham New Street and Sutton Coldfield, departing from Platform 1.
- 2 trains per hour southbound to Redditch only, departing from Platform 2.

Sundays:

- 2 trains per hour northbound to Lichfield Trent Valley.
- 2 trains per hour southbound to Redditch only.

The average journey time to Birmingham New Street is around 31 minutes. On Sundays services call at all stations between Lichfield T.V. and Redditch.

Preceding station	National Rail	Following station
Barnt Green	West Midlands Railway Lichfield – Four Oaks – Birmingham – Redditch; Cross-City Line	Redditch
Historical railways
Barnt Green Line and station open	Midland Railway Evesham loop line	Redditch Line and station open

== History ==
Alvechurch station was built as part of the Redditch Railway and opened on 1 November 1859. From the beginning it was operated by the Midland Railway, who had extended the line south of Redditch to Evesham and Ashchurch (the Evesham Loop Line) by 1868. It became part of the London, Midland and Scottish Railway during the 1923 railway grouping. Under the 1948 transport nationalisation it became part of the London Midland Region of British Railways.

Passenger services beyond Redditch ended in October 1962 and the line closed completely in July 1964. The remainder of the route (including Alvechurch station) was threatened with closure following the publication of the Beeching Report in 1963 but subsequently reprieved (albeit with a much-reduced service of just four trains per day each way from the mid-1960s onwards) to serve the planned Redditch New town development announced in 1964.

As a result of the Transport Act 1968, from 1969 BR operated the passenger service on behalf of the newly created West Midlands Passenger Transport Executive. In 1982 BR divided its business into sectors, and Alvechurch came under its Regional Railways sector. Under the Privatisation of British Rail, Regional Railways was divided into several train operating companies. From 1997 Alvechurch became part of the Central Trains franchise. In 2007 the first franchise expired and was restructured. The new franchise was awarded to London Midland and ran until 2015, after which it passed to West Midlands Trains.

As a PTE station, Alvechurch has train services operated under the Network West Midlands names. Under their auspices, the service was significantly improved in 1980 when the branch became part of the recently inaugurated Cross-City Line from Lichfield City via New Street and Kings Norton.

When the Cross-City line was upgraded and electrified in 1993 the platform at Alvechurch was re-sited slightly northwards. The new platform adjoins the old one end to end. The former station building is now privately owned.

=== 2014 upgrade ===
The section of the Cross-City Line between Barnt Green and Redditch was single track. Network Rail planned to increase capacity by adding a passing loop and second platform at Alvechurch. This was also to include a footbridge and lifts to reach the new platform. This was to allow the service to be increased from two to three trains per hour. The scheme was approved in November 2013.

The work to upgrade Alvechurch station began in November 2013. As of January 2014 the station was cleared and work began on building the new platform and footbridge.

In May 2014 the lift shaft on platform 2 was clearly visible from platform 1.

The section of line between Longbridge and Redditch was closed for 2 months from July 2014 to the end of August 2014 for the new track to be laid and overhead cables to be installed. It was reopened on 1 September 2014. The improved service began in December 2014.

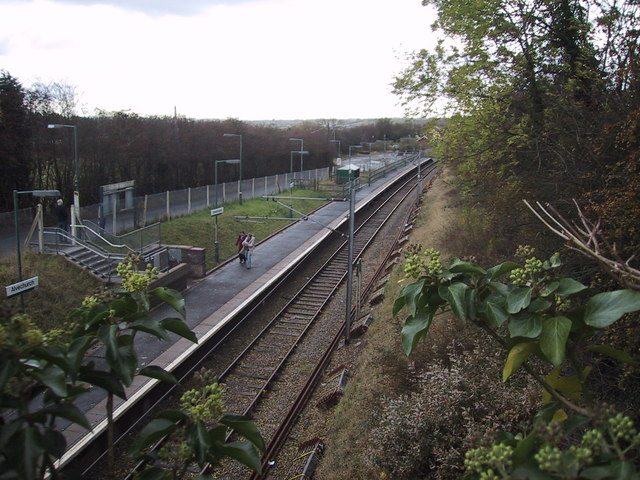
The station prior to the building of the second platform.

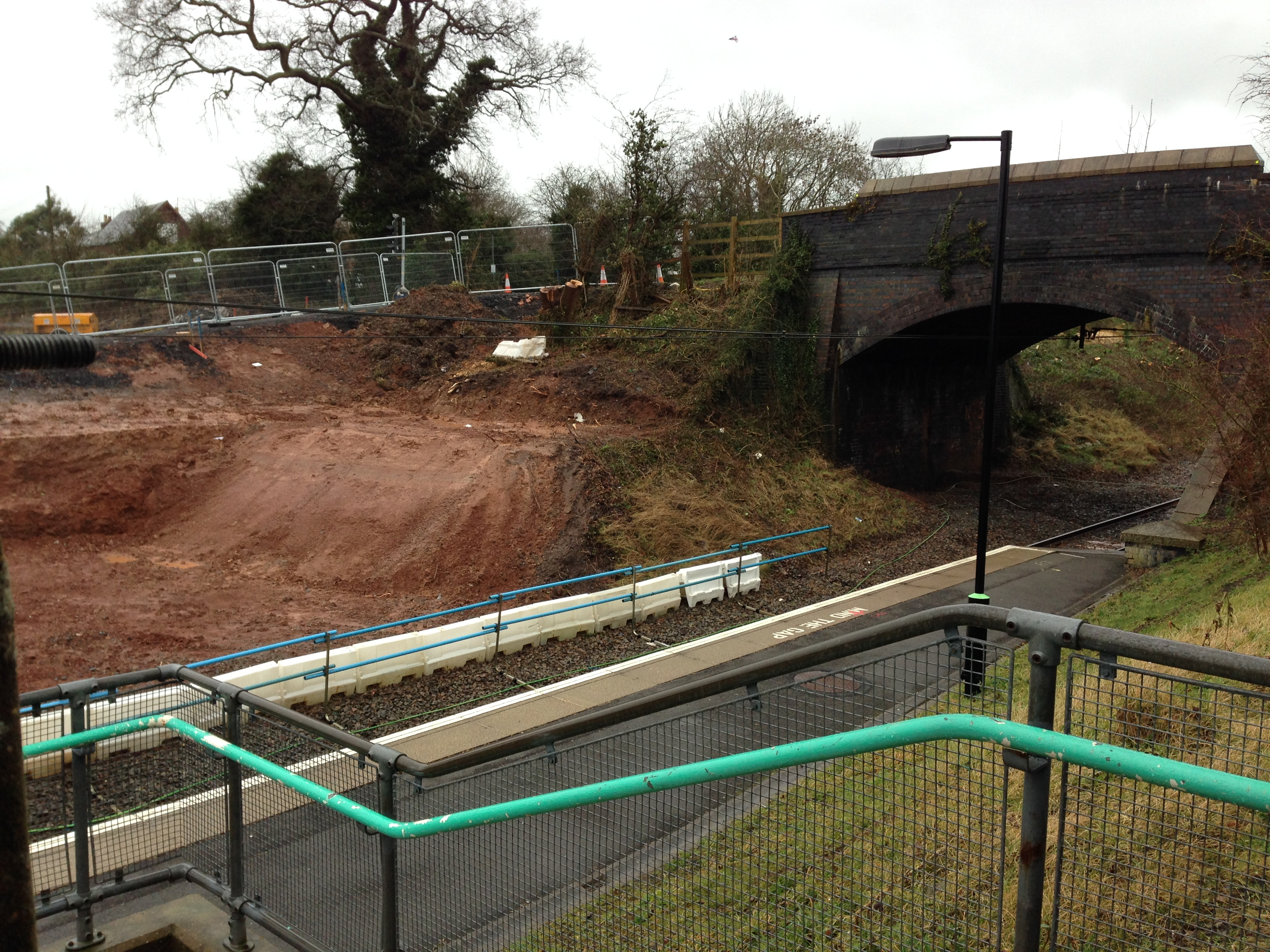
The work to cut the bridge out of the bank February 2014.

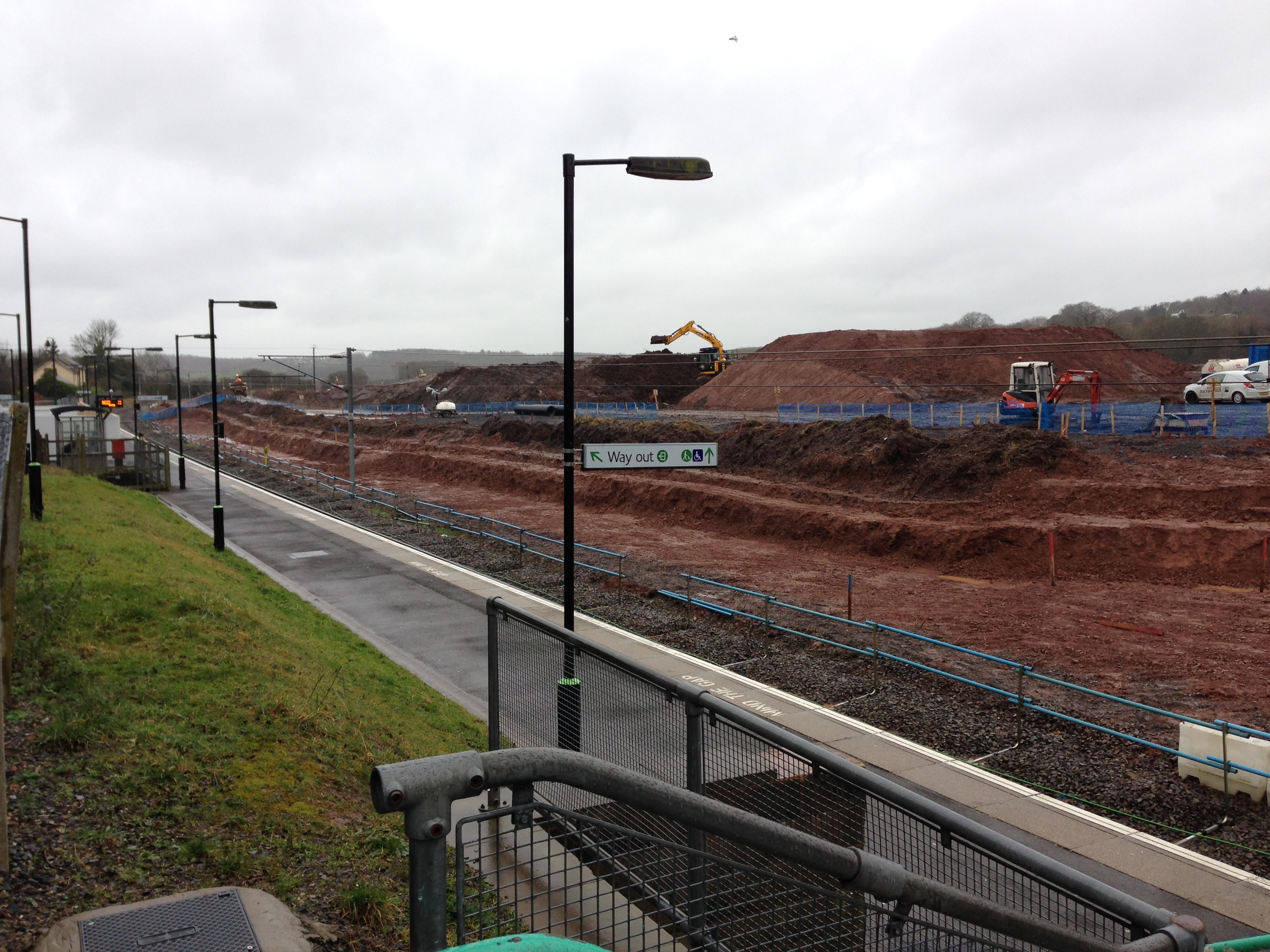
This will be where the second platform to Birmingham will be.

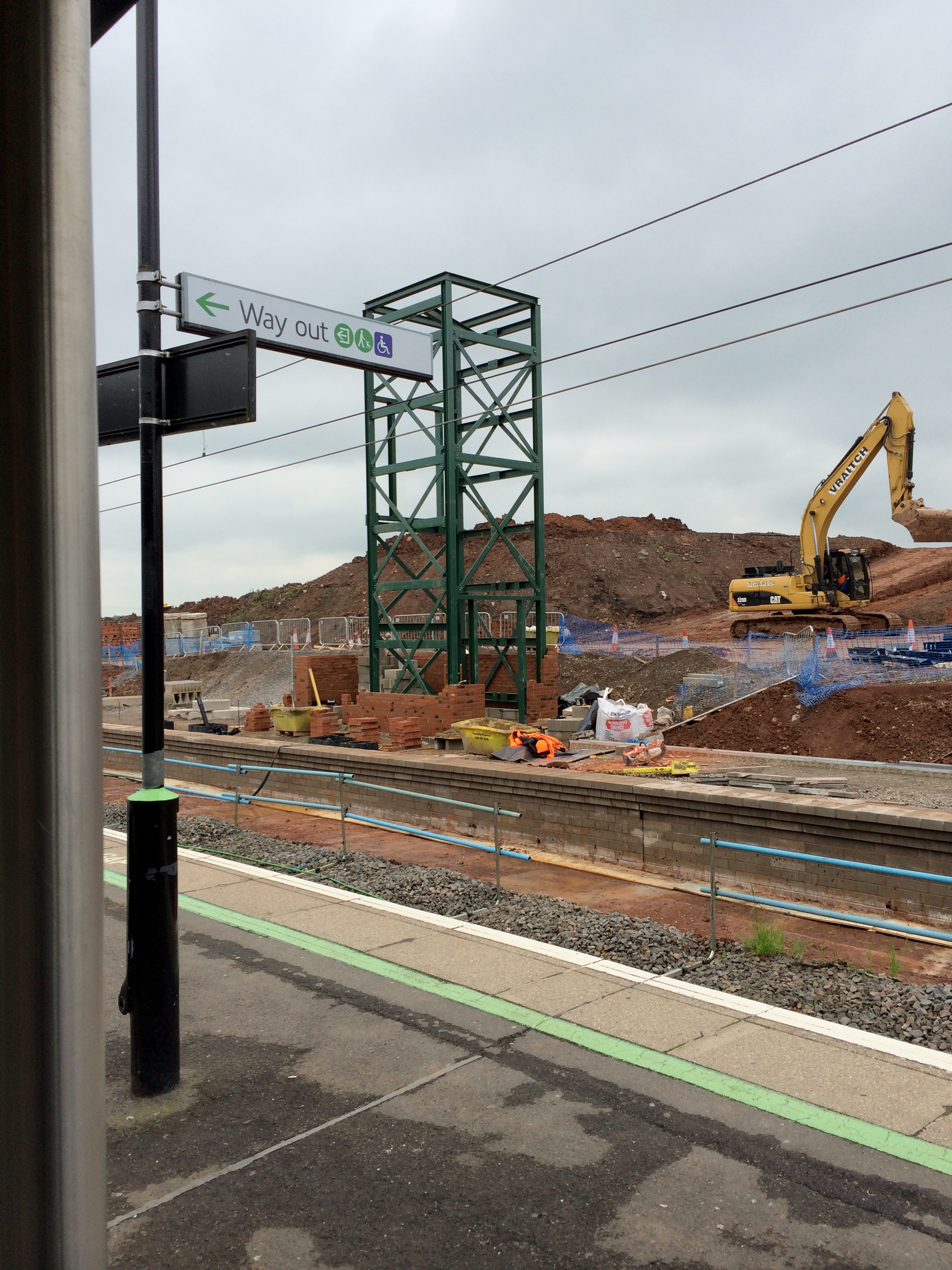
Lift shaft on the new Platform 2. 15 May 2014

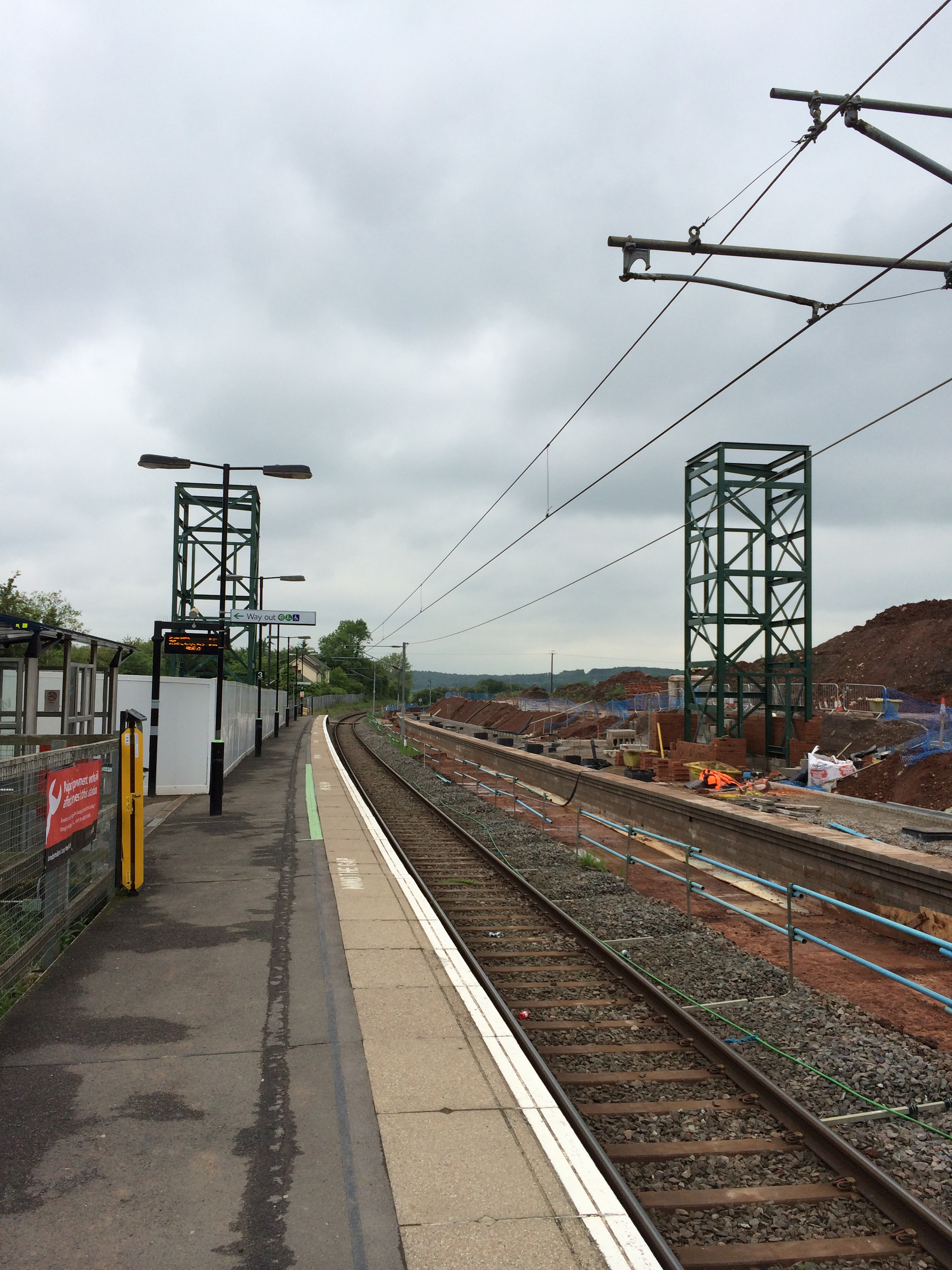
Lift shafts in place on both platforms as work gears up for the footbridge. 15 May 2014.
