= Four Oaks railway station =

Railway station in the West Midlands, England

Coordinates: 52°34′48″N 1°49′41″W

Four Oaks
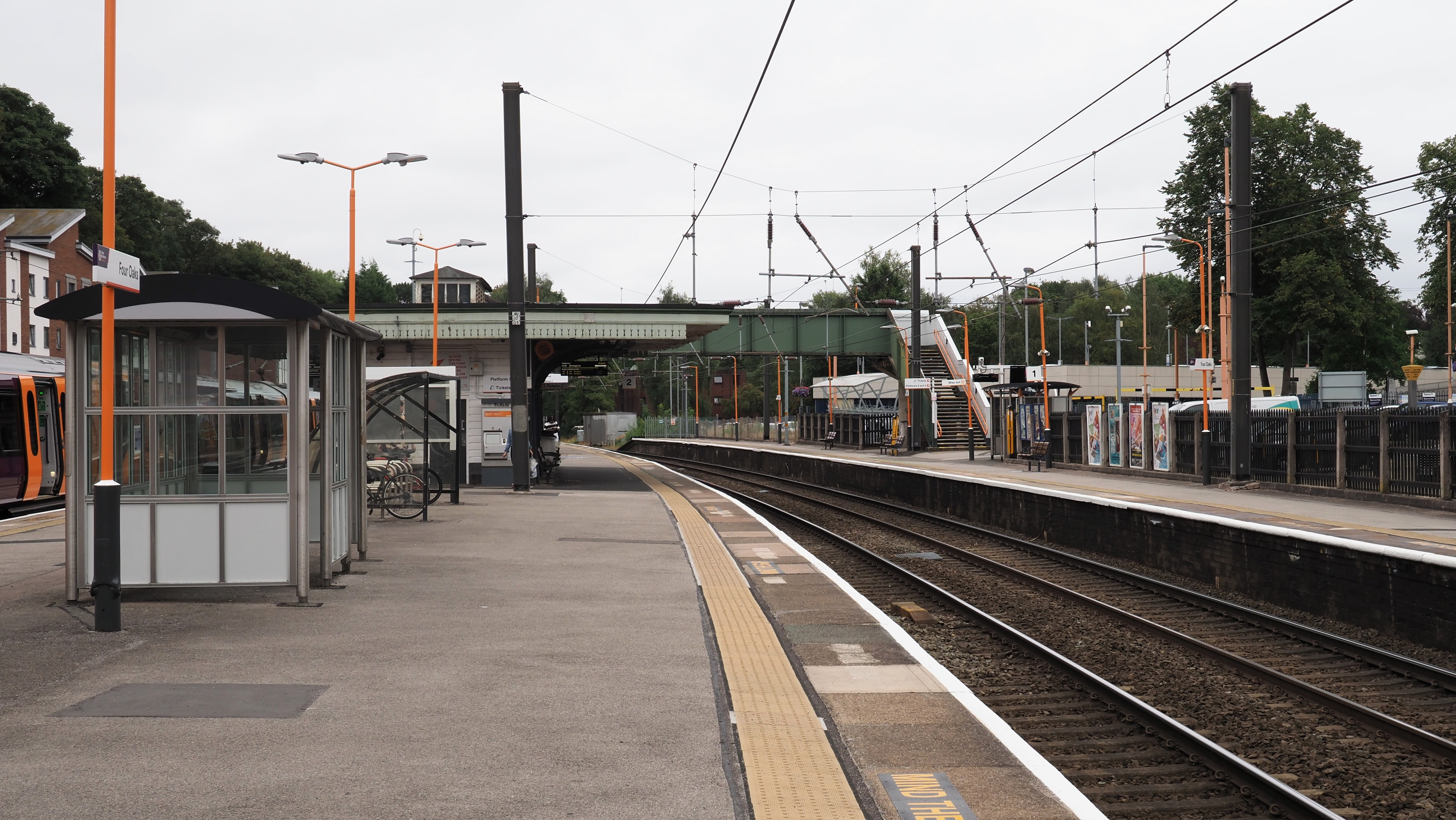
- Four Oaks Station pictured in 2025

General information
- Location: Four Oaks, Birmingham; England
- Grid reference: SP117980
- Manager: West Midlands Railway
- Transit authority: Transport for West Midlands
- Platforms: 3

Other information
- Station code: FOK
- Fare zone: 5
- Classification: DfT category E

History
- Opened: 1884

Passengers
- 2021/22: ▲0.377 million
- 2022/23: ▲0.498 million
- 2023/24: ▲0.606 million
- 2024/25: ▲0.701 million
- 2025/26: ▲0.778 million
Location
Notes
- Passenger statistics from the Office of Rail and Road

Four Oaks railway station serves the Four Oaks area of Sutton Coldfield, West Midlands, England. It is situated on the Cross-City Line. The station and all trains serving it are operated by West Midlands Railway.

== History ==
The station opened in 1884, when the London and North Western Railway's line from Birmingham to Sutton Coldfield was extended to Lichfield. More recently, in May 1978, Four Oaks became the northern terminus of the newly inaugurated Cross-City Line from Longbridge via Birmingham New Street, with trains running up to every ten minutes in each direction.

The line to the north towards Lichfield City had a less frequent service to begin with, as Lichfield being outside the West Midlands PTE boundary; the growing popularity of the route led to it gaining additional services by the mid-1980s. Eventually, the line was extended to Lichfield Trent Valley in November 1988. Electric train operation at the station commenced in 1992, with services running as far as New Street, with the full line through to Redditch following suit in July 1993.

Four Oaks remains a terminus for some services from the south, which mostly use the bay platform 3 on the eastern side of the station to turn back. Northbound trains continuing to Lichfield use platform 1 and southbound ones from there use platform 2, though this can also be used for terminating trains from the south.

== Facilities ==
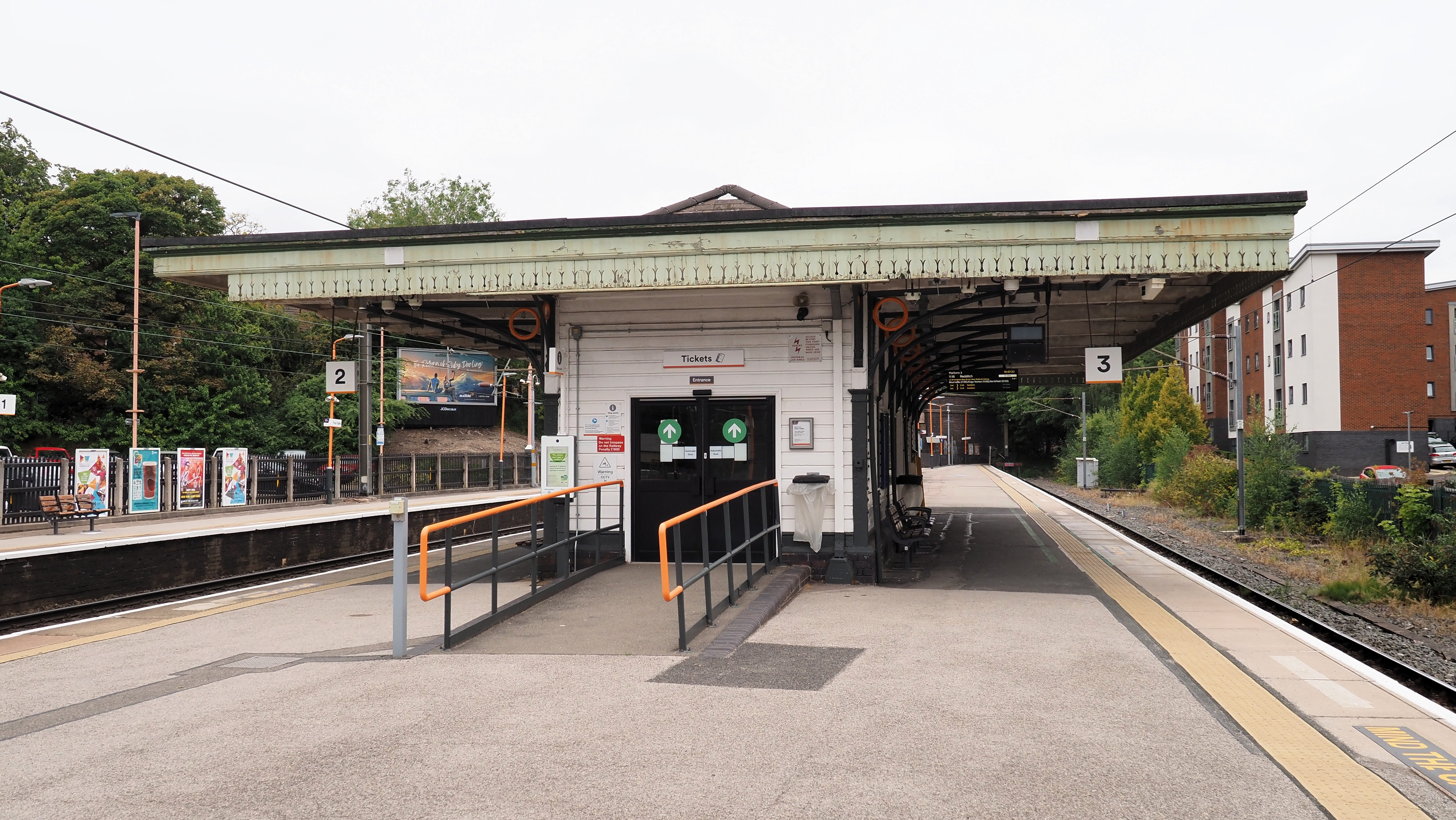
Four Oaks station building situated between platforms 2 & 3

The station has a staffed ticket office on the eastern island platform, which is open seven days per week (Monday - Friday 06:00-20:00, Saturday 07:00-20:00, Sunday 09:00-16:00). Ticket machines are available on platforms 1 and 2/3 for use outside these times and for collecting pre-paid tickets. Train running information is provided by customer help points, timetable posters, automated announcements and CIS displays. Step-free access is available to all three platforms.

== Services ==
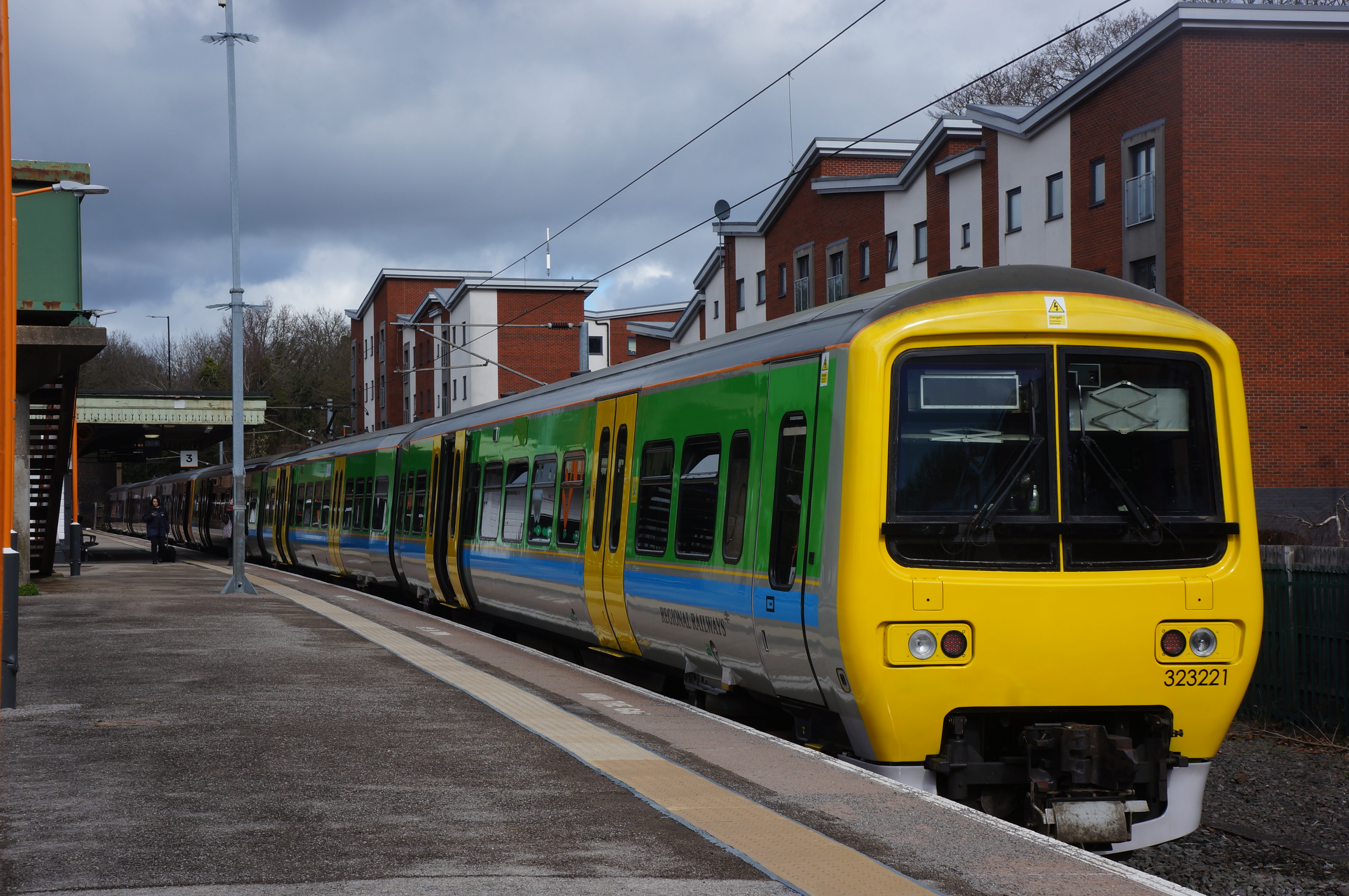
A West Midlands Railway electric multiple unit at platform 3, 2023

The station is served by West Midlands Trains, with local Transport for West Midlands-branded Cross-City services, operated using Class 730 electric multiple units.

The off-peak service pattern is as follows:

Mondays to Saturdays:

- 2tph (trains per hour) northbound to Lichfield Trent Valley, via Lichfield City, departing from platform 1.
- 4tph southbound to Longbridge via Sutton Coldfield, Birmingham New Street and University; of which:
  - 2tph continue to Redditch via Alvechurch, calling at all stations. These start here from platform 3.
  - 2tph continue to Bromsgrove calling at all stations, except Duddeston and 1tph does not call at Barnt Green. These depart from platform 2.

Sundays:

- 2tph northbound to Lichfield Trent Valley.
- 2tph southbound to Redditch.

Services on Sundays call at all stations between Lichfield T.V. and Redditch.

The average journey time to Birmingham New Street is around 24 minutes.

Preceding station	National Rail	Following station
Butlers Lane	West Midlands Railway; Lichfield – Four Oaks – Birmingham – Bromsgrove/Redditch; Cross-City Line	Sutton Coldfield
Terminus	West Midlands Railway; Lichfield – Four Oaks – Birmingham – Bromsgrove/Redditch; Cross-City Line	Sutton Coldfield
