= Barnt Green railway station =

Railway station in Worcestershire, England

Barnt Green
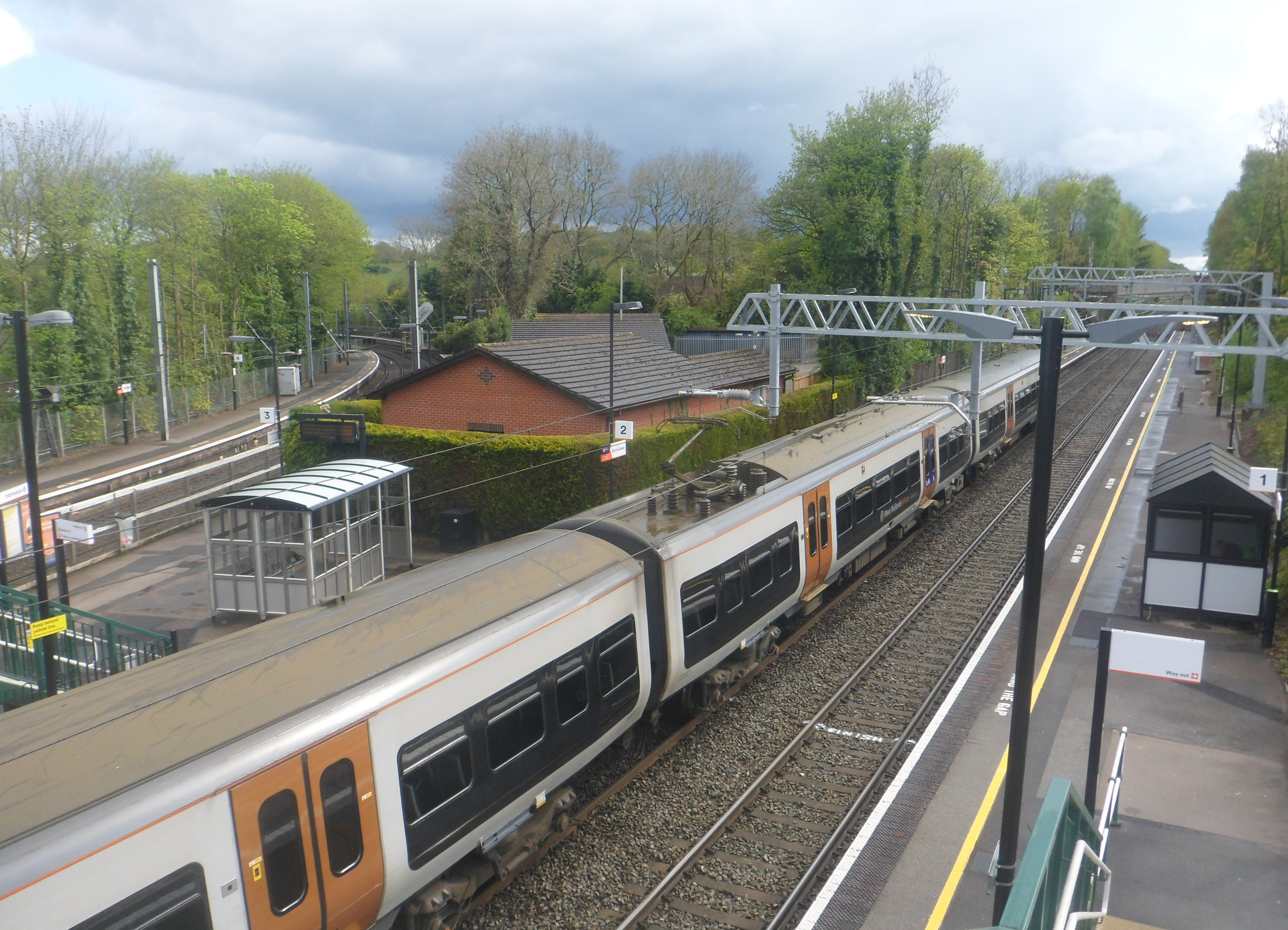
- The Cross-City Line platforms to the left; to the right, the Worcester Line platforms.

General information
- Location: Barnt Green, Bromsgrove; England
- Coordinates: 52.3607°N 1.9926°W
- Grid reference: SP006736
- Manager: West Midlands Railway
- Platforms: 4

Other information
- Station code: BTG
- Classification: DfT category F1

History
- Opened: 1844

Passengers
- 2021/22: ▲0.193 million
- Interchange: ▲38,522
- 2022/23: ▲0.246 million
- Interchange: ▲48,878
- 2023/24: ▲0.298 million
- Interchange: ▲59,781
- 2024/25: ▲0.327 million
- Interchange: ▲71,264
- 2025/26: ▲0.343 million
- Interchange: ▲82,837
Location
Notes
- Passenger statistics from the Office of Rail and Road

Barnt Green railway station serves the village of Barnt Green, Worcestershire, England. It is situated 9 1/2 miles (15.3 km) south west of Birmingham New Street. The station, and all trains serving it, are operated by West Midlands Trains.

Barnt Green station is at the point of a Y-shaped junction between the main line towards Bromsgrove, Worcester and the south-east, and the branch line to Redditch which is part of the Cross-City Line. It has platforms on both lines, until 2018 only the Redditch line platforms saw regular services, however since Cross-City Line services were extended to Bromsgrove, the main line platforms now also see regular use.

== History ==
The main line through Barnt Green was built and opened by the Birmingham and Gloucester Railway in 1841, but it would be 1844 before Barnt Green received its station. The B&GR was linked to the Bristol and Gloucester Railway in 1845 to create a through route to the West Country and then became part of the Midland Railway's expanding network in 1846. The station then became a junction in 1859 with the opening of the Midland's branch line to Redditch. This was subsequently extended through to Evesham and Ashchurch in stages between 1866 and 1868. The Midland then opened a second route into Birmingham New Street (the Birmingham West Suburban Railway) in 1885 to provide an alternative to the original B&GR main line via Camp Hill, which was becoming increasingly congested at its eastern end (which it shared with the LNWR main line from Euston and the Midland's own route from Derby).

Though the station was used as an interchange between the two lines from the outset, its main line platforms were initially staggered - the northbound platform being located north of the junction and initially connected to the two southbound ones by a foot crossing (which was replaced by a footbridge in 1895). A second platform on the branch was provided in 1894, when the first 350 yards from the junction were doubled. A more comprehensive rebuilding scheme came in 1928, when the Cofton Tunnel was demolished and replaced by a wide cutting, so that the main line towards Northfield and Kings Norton could be quadrupled by the LMS (who had taken over ownership of the station at the 1923 Grouping). This saw the Birmingham-bound platform relocated south of the junction to create the layout still in use today.

A correspondent who lived close to Barnt Green station from the Second World War onwards reminds us that it stood on an important NE-SW express route. It was part of the route of The Pines Express for a long time. As a child he would stand on the Worcester-Birmingham platform with his sister, seeing ambulance trains painted dark green with red crosses passing through. Other troop trains held American soldiers and when they saw us, they threw sweets and coins to us which came bouncing across the platform. At that time there was a large waiting room on that side with a ticket window, now removed. Close to that stood a green-painted W H Smith bookstall run by Mr. C. B. Fallick. On summer Saturdays the sound of holiday special trains climbing the Lickey Incline with their bankers was clearly audible and then shortly afterwards they would "burst out" from under the road bridge at the end of the platform. They were mostly hauled by Black Fives, sometimes a Patriot and occasionally a Midland Compound valiantly hauling one of those long trains. The compounds typically hauled most of the Birmingham-Worcester local trains and he would travel down and up the Lickey Incline to school once a day for six years, acquiring a lifelong love for those locomotives and the hollow bark of their exhaust.

The Evesham loop line through Redditch and Evesham was used in Midland and LMS days as a relief route for freight traffic to avoid the steeply graded Lickey Incline in addition to carrying local passenger traffic, but under British Rail auspices it was closed to passengers south of Redditch in October 1962 due to the poor condition of the track (formal closure occurring on 17 June 1963) and completely in July 1964.

The remaining part of the branch north of Redditch had seen its service dieselised and improved to hourly in April 1960, only for it to be listed for closure in the Beeching Report of 1963 along with Barnt Green station itself. As a precursor to this, the timetable was drastically cut back in May 1964, with only a handful of (mostly) peak period services being retained. However the route was eventually reprieved in August 1965 after protests from local rail users and the area's four MPs. The main station building was demolished in 1970, while the large waiting room and booking office on the opposite platform continued in use into the mid-1970s, complete with a roaring coal fire welcoming passengers on winter mornings.

Stopping trains on the main line southwards toward Worcester Shrub Hill and Cheltenham Spa were withdrawn in April 1966 (though the station at Bromsgrove survived), leaving the by now unstaffed station to be served by the few surviving Redditch to Birmingham trains for the next 14 years (the BR timetable of 1972 lists just four trains in each direction serving all of the surviving local stations on the route - two return trips in the morning peak, one at midday, one in the evening and no Sunday service). There was also one train per day in each direction on the Hereford-Birmingham route at 8.02 (known as the 'Eight-Late') arriving New Street at approximately 8.35, and an evening stop at Barnt Green from the 17.35 departure from New Street.

The service level was eventually boosted in May 1980, when hourly trains were reintroduced between Longbridge and Redditch as an extension of the recently commissioned Birmingham Cross-City Line from Lichfield City. This frequency was increased to half-hourly in 1989 and in 1992 the route was electrified (though only the centre main lines were wired beyond Longbridge - the outer lines remain diesel-only and are designated as goods loops). A limited service has also returned to the mainline platforms in recent years, provided by trains on the New St - Worcester - Hereford line (see below).

== Facilities ==
The station has no permanent buildings (the building located behind shrubs adjacent to Platforms 2 and 3 is a private business, in no way affiliated with the station). It has automatic ticket machines located on platforms 3 and 4, and shelters are provided on Platforms 2, 3 and 4. A footbridge connects all four platforms, although there is no access for wheelchairs. There is step-free access to Platforms 1 and 4. The station has a small (charged) car park adjacent to Platform 4 provided jointly by Bromsgrove District Council/West Midlands Trains. The station along with all those located on the Cross-City line has departure boards showing real time train information, located on Platforms 3 and 4.

== Services ==
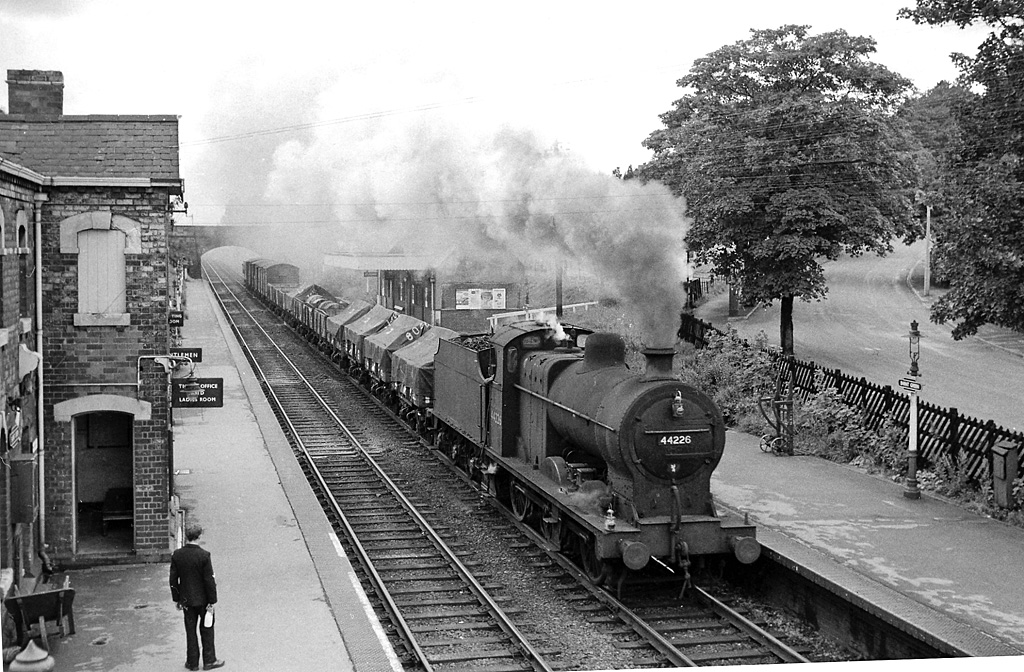
Barnt Green Station, with an Up freight in 1963

The station is served by West Midlands Trains with local Transport for West Midlands branded "Cross-City" services, operated using Class 323 Electric multiple units (EMUs) until September 2024 and currently by Class 730 EMUs.

The off-peak service pattern is as follows:

Mondays to Saturdays:

- 3 trains per hour (tph) northbound to Four Oaks via University, Birmingham New Street and Sutton Coldfield, 2 tph terminate at Four Oaks and depart from Platform 3.

Of which:

- 1 tph continues to Lichfield Trent Valley via Lichfield City, calling at all stations except Duddeston, departing from Platform 1.

Southbound Cross-City line services towards Redditch depart from Platform 4, departing every half-hour (Monday-Friday, first train departs at 06:13; last train departs at 23:43). Services to Bromsgrove down the Lickey incline began on 29 July 2018, with an hourly off-peak service in operation from platform 2 (the actual frequency to Bromsgrove is half-hourly, but alternate trains skip this station). Services were more frequent prior to the COVID pandemic (as can be seen from the Winter 2019 online timetable)

On Monday-Friday, the first train to Four Oaks via Birmingham departs at 06:12; with the last train to Lichfield City departing at 22:42 and the last for Birmingham departing at 23:42. These trains originate alternately at Redditch and Bromsgrove since the start of operations from the latter on 29 July 2018.

On Sundays there are 3tph to Birmingham New Street, with the first departing at 09:38 (2tph to/from Redditch and 1tph to/from Bromsgrove) with the 2tph from Redditch continuing to Lichfield Trent Valley.

The station is also served by a limited service on the Birmingham to Worcester line using Class 196 Diesel multiple units (Monday-Friday only). The service terminating at Great Malvern departs at 07:39, with the service terminating at Hereford departing at 08:17, while the service towards Birmingham New Street departs at 16:54.

Preceding station	National Rail	Following station
Longbridge	West Midlands Railway; Lichfield – Four Oaks – Birmingham – Bromsgrove/Redditch; Cross-City Line	Alvechurch
Longbridge	West Midlands Railway; Lichfield – Four Oaks – Birmingham – Bromsgrove/Redditch; Cross-City Line	Bromsgrove
University	West Midlands Railway Birmingham – Bromsgrove – Worcester – Hereford (peak times)	Bromsgrove
Disused railways
Blackwell	Birmingham and Gloucester Railway	Croft Farm
Terminus	Midland Railway Gloucester Loop Line	Alvechurch
