= Sutton Coldfield railway station =

Railway station in West Midlands, England

Sutton Coldfield
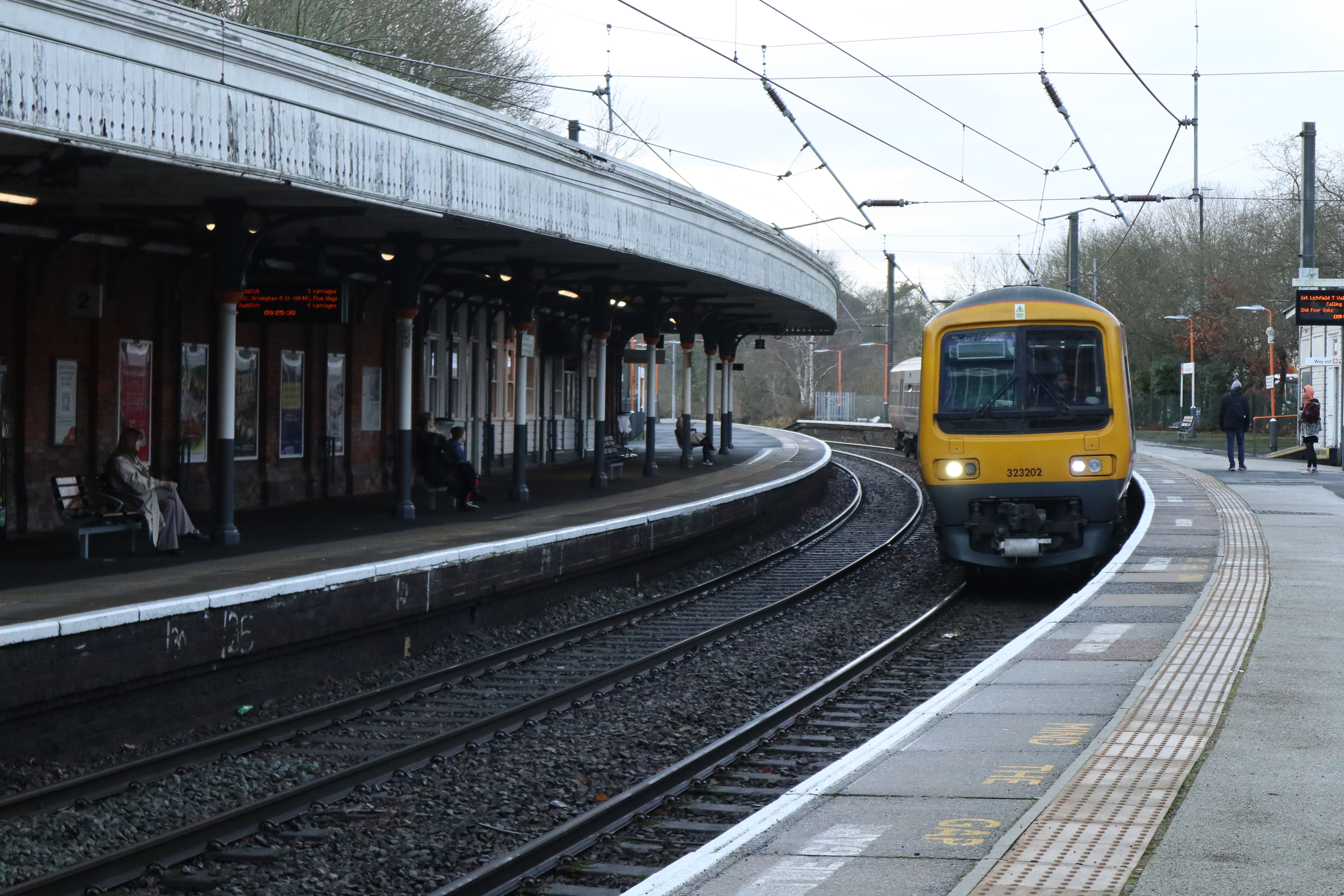
- A Class 323 train entering the station in 2024.

General information
- Location: Sutton Coldfield, Birmingham; England
- Coordinates: 52.564°N 1.824°W
- Grid reference: SP118963
- Manager: West Midlands Railway
- Transit authority: Transport for West Midlands
- Platforms: 2

Other information
- Station code: SUT
- Fare zone: 4
- Classification: DfT category D

Key dates
- 2 June 1862: Opened
- 2003: Renovated

Passengers
- 2021/22: ▲0.645 million
- 2022/23: ▲0.805 million
- 2023/24: ▲0.937 million
- 2024/25: ▲1.035 million
- 2025/26: ▲1.197 million
Location
Notes
- Passenger statistics from the Office of Rail and Road

Sutton Coldfield is the main railway station for the town of Sutton Coldfield, in Birmingham, West Midlands, England. It is a stop on the Cross-City Line between Bromsgrove/Redditch and Lichfield Trent Valley; it is located 7 1/2 miles (12.1 km) north-east of Birmingham New Street.

The station is of Victorian architecture, with red brick and elaborate ceilings and pillars. One platform is sheltered while the other is open air. The main building itself is built on a hill, with a tunnel running underneath it. It is accessed via Station Street and Railway Road.

== History ==
The station was constructed in 1862, as the northern terminus of the line from Birmingham built by the London and North Western Railway. In 1884, the line was extended north to Lichfield and, after the grouping of railway companies in 1923, it came under the control of the London, Midland and Scottish Railway.

The station was the location of the Sutton Coldfield train disaster on 23 January 1955, when an express from York to Bristol travelling at excessive speed derailed. A memorial to the 17 people who died was unveiled in the station concourse on 23 January 2016.

From 1978, the station became one of those served by the new Cross-City Line, sponsored by the West Midlands Passenger Transport Executive. As part of that scheme, there were proposals to demolish the station and rebuild it, as happened to many of the other stations on the line. However, local campaigning saved it.

=== Refurbishment ===
Following the provision of a large sum of money in 2003, the station underwent a programme of refurbishment. Many new facilities were provided and repair work was undertaken to the station building. The southbound platform was repainted and a former wooden ticket office removed because it had become a target for vandalism and concerns were raised about its fire safety.

A new ticket vending machine was placed on the platform which reduced queues at the ticket office in the main building. A station shop and a new waiting room were provided. On the northbound platform, the small waiting room was replaced with new seats. Passenger information system boards were also installed on both platforms which provides passengers with up-to-the-minute information on train times. The interior of the station was also repainted and the ticket office in the main building was extended.

== Services ==
The station is served by West Midlands Trains with local Transport for West Midlands-branded Cross-City services, operated using Class 730 electric multiple units.

The off-peak service pattern is as follows:

Mondays to Saturdays:

- 4 tph (trains per hour) northbound to Four Oaks, departing from platform 1; of which:
  - 2tph continue to Lichfield Trent Valley, via Lichfield City.
- 4tph southbound to Longbridge, via Birmingham New Street and University, departing from platform 2; of which:
  - 2 tph continue to Redditch via Alvechurch, calling at all stations.
  - 2 tph continue to Bromsgrove calling at all stations except Duddeston and 1 tph does not call at Barnt Green.

Sundays:

- 2 tph northbound to Lichfield Trent Valley.
- 2 tph southbound to Redditch.

Services on Sundays call at all stations between Lichfield T.V. and Redditch.

The average journey time to Birmingham New Street is around 21 minutes.

Preceding station	National Rail	Following station
Four Oaks	West Midlands Railway; Lichfield – Four Oaks – Birmingham – Bromsgrove/Redditch; Cross-City Line	Wylde Green
