= Birmingham to Worcester via Bromsgrove line =

Railway line in the West Midlands, England

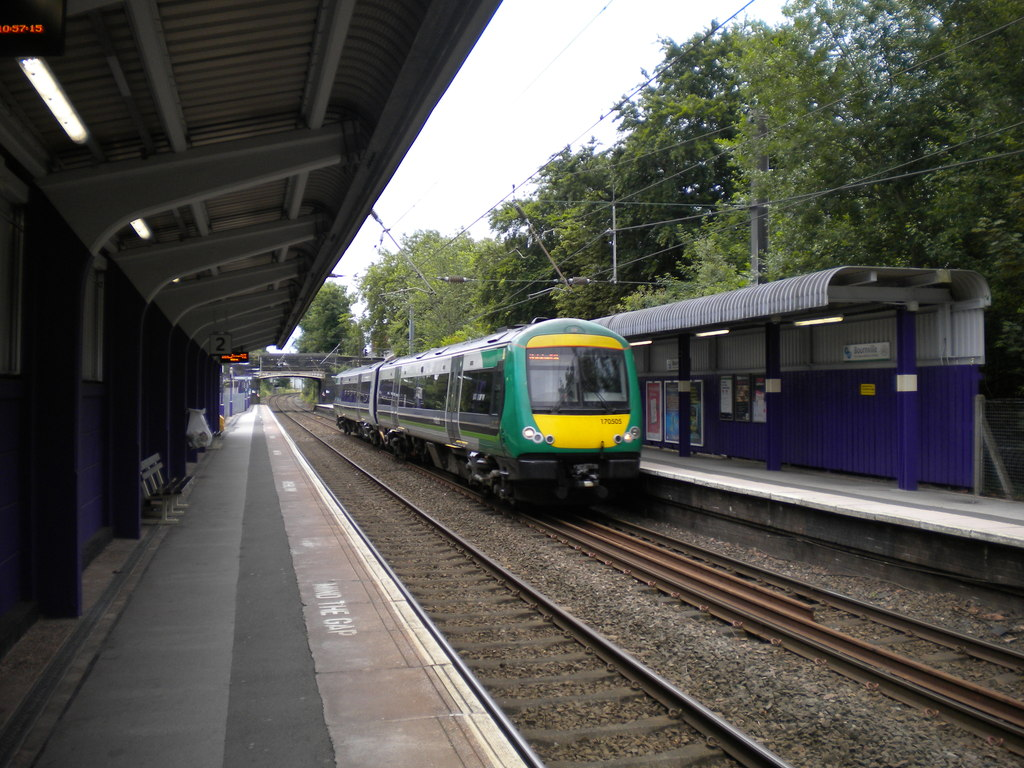
- Bournville station

Overview
- Status: Operational
- Owner: Network Rail
- Locale: Worcestershire; West Midlands; West Midlands (region)

Service
- Type: Suburban rail, Heavy rail
- System: National Rail

Technical
- Track gauge: 1,435 mm (4 ft 8 1/2 in) standard gauge
Route map
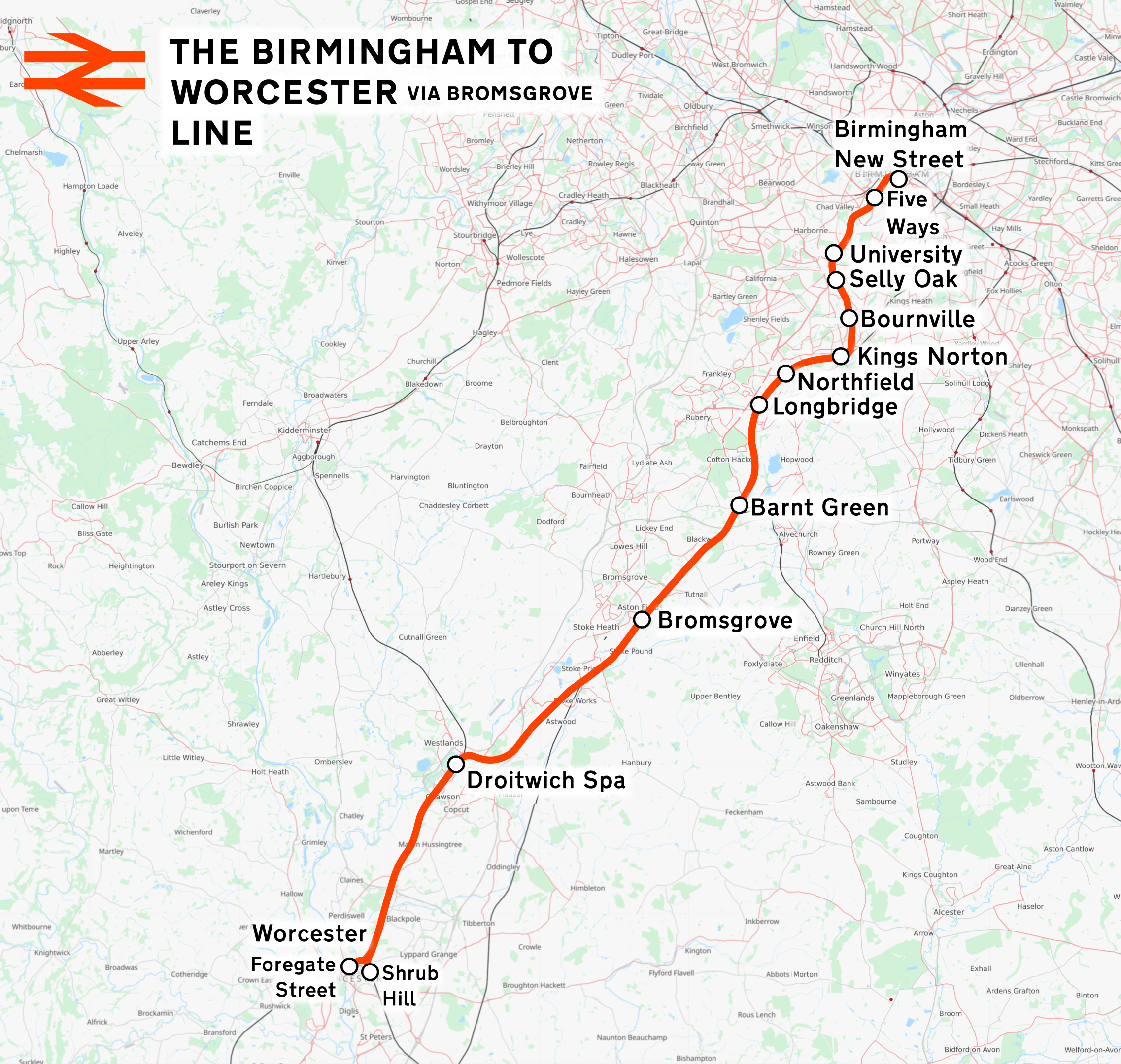

The Birmingham to Worcester via Bromsgrove line is a railway line in the West Midlands of England connecting Birmingham to Worcester via Bromsgrove. The most notable feature on the line is the Lickey Incline, between Barnt Green and Bromsgrove.

It is one of two railway routes between Birmingham and Worcester, the other route runs via Kidderminster. The route via Bromsgrove runs into Birmingham New Street, while the route via Kidderminster runs into Birmingham Snow Hill.

The line serves the following places:

- Birmingham
- University of Birmingham
- Barnt Green
- Bromsgrove
- Droitwich Spa
- Worcester

== Services ==
Passenger services are provided by West Midlands Trains as part of their Birmingham to Hereford service. As of May 2023, off-peak, one train per hour runs between Birmingham New Street, Worcester and Hereford on this route, calling at University, Bromsgrove, Droitwich Spa, Worcester Foregate Street, Malvern Link, Great Malvern, Colwall and Ledbury on its way to Hereford, with most Worcester trains continuing onwards to Hereford via the Cotswold Line. Some services run to Worcester Shrub Hill with those services running non-stop from Droitwich to Shrub Hill. A handful of trains per day also call at Barnt Green. On weekdays and Saturdays one northbound train per day runs via the Camp Hill line, missing the usual stop at University and approaching Birmingham New Street via Proof House Junction.
