= Birmingham West Suburban Railway =

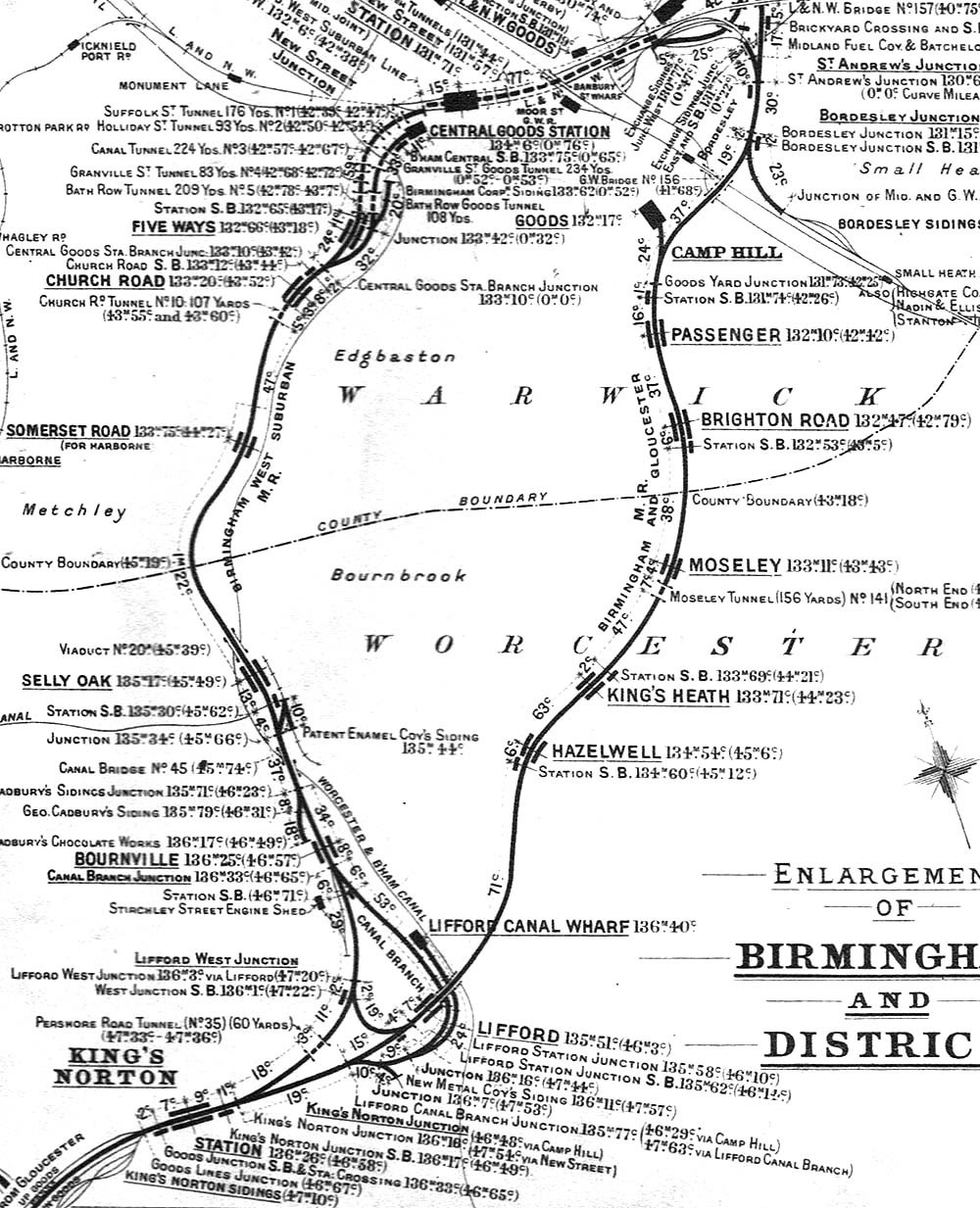
- A 1913 map showing the Birmingham West Suburban Railway (left) and the Camp Hill line (right) between Kings Norton and Birmingham New Street

Overview
- Status: Open as part of the Cross-City Line
- Owner: Builder: Midland Railway; Owner: Network Rail
- Locale: Birmingham, England
- Termini: Birmingham New Street (1885) Granville Street (1876–1885); Stirchley Street (1876) Kings Norton (1876–1885)

Service
- Operator(s): Midland Railway and successors
- Depot(s): 21B (Bournville Engine Shed)

History
- Opened: 1876
- Closed: 1885 (integrated into mainline)

Technical
- Track gauge: 1,435 mm (4 ft 8 1/2 in) standard gauge

The Birmingham West Suburban Railway (BWSR) was a suburban railway built by the Midland Railway company. Opened in stages between 1876 and 1885, it allowed both the opening of development of central southwest suburban Birmingham south into Worcestershire and the by-passing of railway traffic via the Birmingham and Gloucester Railway into central Birmingham. Today, it forms a major section of the Cross-City Line, running from Lichfield to Redditch. It also forms an important part of the Cross Country Route.

== History ==
=== Origins ===
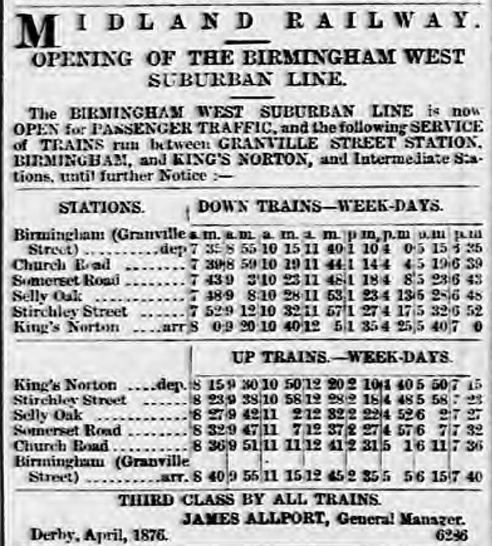
Clipping from Aris's Birmingham Gazette (8 April 1876) detailing the opening of the Birmingham West Suburban line, including a timetable

As early as 1840, the Worcester and Birmingham Canal attempted to stem the decline in its income, by promoting a scheme to build a railway alongside its canal from the existing Birmingham and Gloucester Railway at Kings Norton into central Birmingham, with a branch to Harborne. The company intended that the railway would pay rent to the canal company for use of their land, thus providing an extra income, but it was unable to raise the funds for the scheme and it was dropped.

Birmingham West Suburban Railway Act 1871
- Act of Parliament
- Parliament of the United Kingdom
- Long title: An Act for authorising the making of a Railway from Birmingham in the county of Warwick to King's Norton in the county of Worcester; and for other purposes.
- Citation: 34 & 35 Vict. c. clxxv

Dates
- Royal assent: 31 July 1871

Text of statute as originally enacted

A group of local businessmen revived the scheme in 1870, noticing the potential of a railway to spur suburban development of the under developed areas of south Birmingham and the villages of northern Worcestershire. They proposed that the line would run alongside the Worcester and Birmingham Canal, and pay an annual rent to the canal company for the use of their land, and that the line would be worked by the Midland Railway. The branch to Harborne was dropped from the revived scheme. In this form the scheme succeeded and the Birmingham West Suburban Railway Act 1871 authorising it was passed by Parliament in 1871.

In the original plans, the line would have crossed over the Worcester and Birmingham Canal on a viaduct from the south to reach its intended Birmingham terminus at Suffolk Street station at Albion Wharf. Surviving plans for this station show it would have been built at the end of the viaduct 36 feet (11 metres) above street level; passengers would have reached the station by means of either a steep ramp or a staircase. As the promoters were unable to raise the funds to build the viaduct, the terminus was cut back to Granville Street station on the southern side of the canal, further away from the centre of Birmingham. The later Central Goods station was at roughly the location of the proposed Suffolk Street terminus, but was reached by a tunnel under the canal. The line was opened on 3 April 1876. The Midland Railway had obtained powers to take the company over, and these were exercised as soon as the line was opened.

=== Original route ===
As originally built, the BWSR was a single track line with one passing loop at Selly Oak station. The line originally took a winding route which closely followed the contours of the canal. It exited from Granville Street, then proceeded through Church Road, Somerset Road and Selly Oak, before reaching what was originally called Stirchley Street. The original line then followed the route of the canal east under the Pershore Road to what was effectively a joint dual-level station at Lifford. It then passed under the Birmingham and Gloucester Railway viaduct and turned sharp right (westwards), steeply climbing to join with the Birmingham and Gloucester to the east of Kings Norton railway station. Due to the engineering involved in this part of the line, it opened two months after the rest of the line in April 1876, under full operational control of soon to be owner, the Midland Railway.

=== Upgrade ===
Although originally conceived as a local suburban line, the Midland Railway soon realised the potential of the BWSR to create a new through route which would enter Birmingham New Street station from the west, and therefore allow their trains from Derby to Bristol to pass directly through New Street, instead of having to reverse direction to continue their journey via the original Birmingham and Gloucester route which entered Birmingham from the east. They obtained powers in 1881 to upgrade the line by doubling the track throughout, straightening out the winding route, and building a new connection at the northern end to New Street station.

At the northern end, the project completed works connecting Birmingham New Street (which was extended as part of the development) to the BWSR via tunnels under both Gloucester and Bath Rows and then via a new station at Five Ways. This new route via Five Ways bypassed the original line into Granville Street, which became a spur. At the southern end a major development was undertaken, known as the 'Stirchley Street and Bournville to Kings Norton Deviation': After passing through the renamed Bournville and Stirchley station, the line was swung westwards away from the canal after passing under the Mary Vale Road bridge, to join the Birmingham and Gloucester to the north of Kings Norton station, providing a more direct and flatter route between Kings Norton and the BWSR, the original route became known as the Canal Branch, and remained open as a siding until the 1960s. The doubling of the track was accompanied by the rebuilding of the stations and the easing of the sharp curves in the line where it had followed the bends of the canal. The work was started in 1883, and completed in 1885. From this date Midland expresses started using the BWSR rather than the original Birmingham and Gloucester route, which became known as the Camp Hill line.

Following integration of the line with the Midland Railway system, the company undertook four key further developments:

- The closure of the now redundant Granville Street station (which was effectively replaced by the new Five Ways station nearby), allowed what was now a spur line to be extended under the canal to open the Central Goods railway station in 1887 (originally known as 'Worcester Wharf' until 1892), providing easier transfer of particularly fresh food freight from the southwest into central Birmingham.
- The Lifford curve opened in 1892, created a north-facing connection between the BWSR and Camp Hill line allowing a circular service along the Birmingham West Suburban and return via the Camp Hill line, this service operated until local services on the Camp Hill line were withdrawn in 1941 as a wartime economy. The curve also allowed goods trains from the north to access Central Goods station.
- Quadrupling of the joint line between Kings Norton and Northfield, extended south to the junction with Halesowen Joint Railway in 1892.
- A new engine shed was opened at Bournville, constructed on the route of the old Stirchley-Lifford-Kings Norton alignment, alongside the realigned main line in 1895.

By 1892, the railway had allowed rapid expansion of southern Birmingham and northern Worcestershire, which was partly responsible for the boundaries of Birmingham being expanded in 1911.

=== Later history ===
For much of the 20th century, local passenger services on the BWSR went into decline in the face of competition from trams, buses and cars, only to be revived again in the 1970s. Three of the original stations on the BWSR were closed in the early 20th century due to lack of use: Church Road station closed in 1925, followed by Somerset Road in 1930. Closure of Five Ways station followed in 1944 as a wartime economy. In 1941, the circular service via the Camp Hill line had also ceased due to wartime economy.

In 1964, the closure of all the stations between New Street and Redditch (along with the branch to Redditch) was proposed by the Beeching Axe. They were reprieved from closure in 1967; however, the service was cut back to a handful of trains at peak times for commuters.

In 1978, the BWSR was revived when it became part of the Cross-City Line: A new frequent interval service was introduced linking it to the line to Sutton Coldfield and Lichfield to the north of Birmingham, and to a new Longbridge station to the south (later extended to Redditch). Five Ways station was re-opened as part of this scheme and a new station was opened at University, near the site of the former Somerset Road station. The line was electrified in the early 1990s by British Rail.

== Cadbury railway ==
In 1861, John Cadbury's sons Richard and George had taken over 'Cadbury Brothers of Birmingham,' then based in central Birmingham at Bridge Street.

Noticing the development of the BWSR, the Cadbury Brothers began a search for land on which to develop a factory. At the time, their milk was delivered on canal barges, mainly via the Worcester and Birmingham Canal, while their cocoa was delivered either from London or Southampton via railway. They hence were looking for a junction of canal and rail.

In 1878, the company acquired the Bournbrook estate, comprising 14.5 acres (5.9 ha) of countryside 5 miles (8.0 km) south of the outskirts of Birmingham, right next to the new Stirchley Street station. They renamed the Bournbrook estate to the French-sounding Bournville, and opened the Bournville factory in 1879.

In 1893, George Cadbury bought 120 acres (49 ha) of land close to the works and planned, at his own expense, a model village which would 'alleviate the evils of modern more cramped living conditions'. By 1900, the estate included 313 cottages and houses set on 330 acres (130 ha) of land. As the Cadbury family were Quakers there were no pubs in the estate.

=== Station names ===
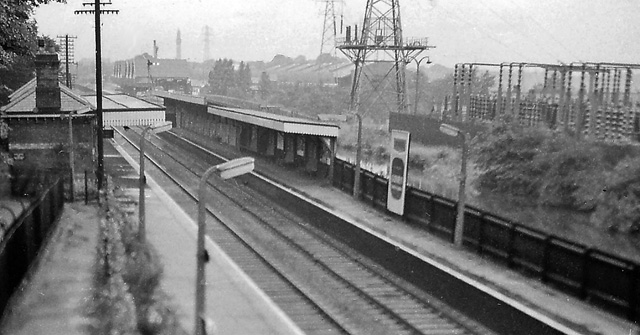
Bournville railway station in 1962, pre-electrification, looking northeast from Mary Vale Road bridge

In 1876, Bournville station had opened as Stirchley Street, a single platform with later added run around loop. However, with the opening of the Cadbury factory, in 1880 the station was renamed 'Stirchley Street and Bournville.'. When the railway track was doubled along its entire length in 1885, this necessitated the construction of a southbound platform between the line and the Worcester to Birmingham Canal, resulting even today in a narrow concourse. In 1904, the station was finally renamed 'Bournville.'

=== Bournville Works Railway ===
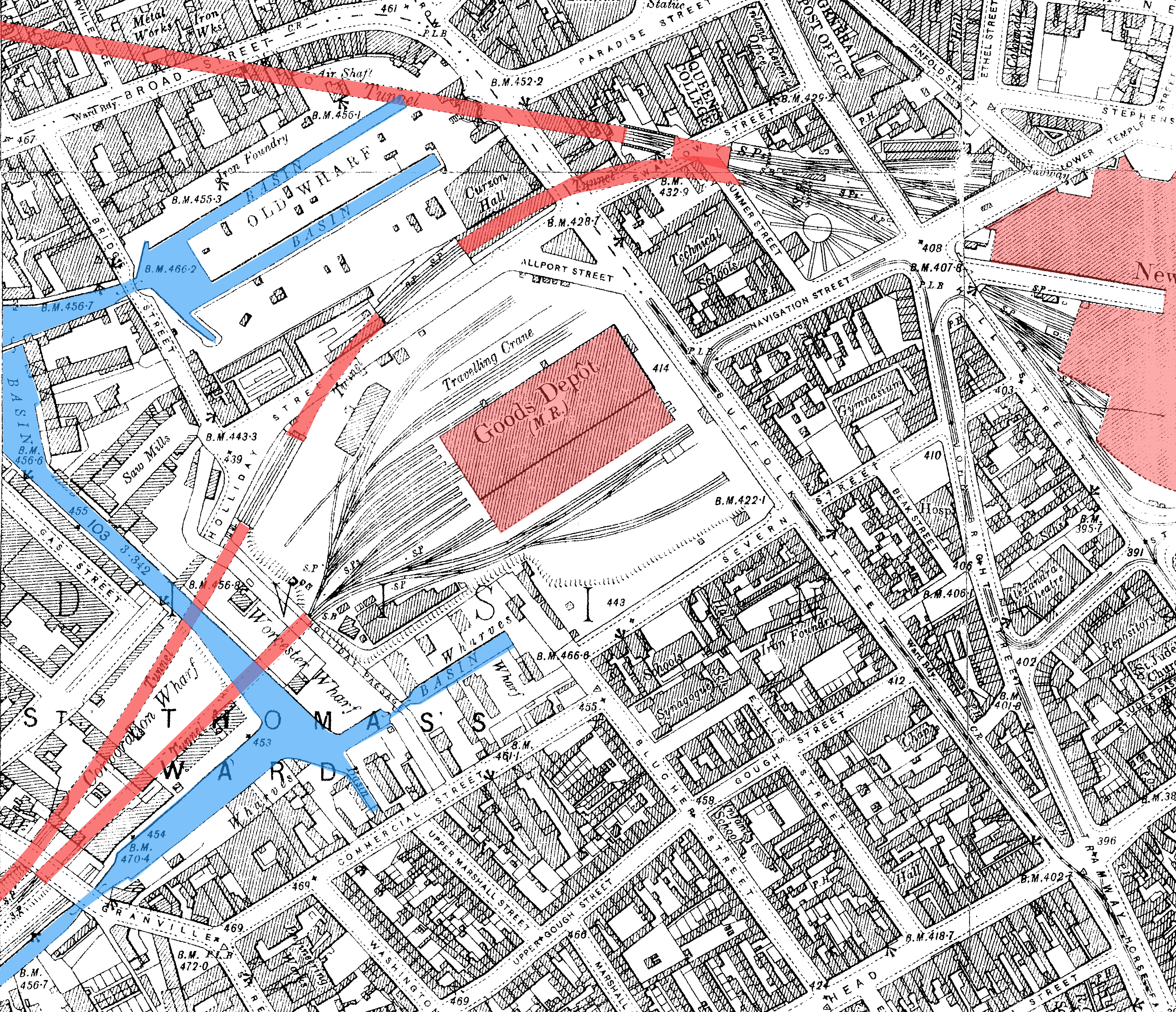
1905 map of Birmingham with tunnels and Central Goods Depot in relation to New Street Station

When the factory opened in 1879, they initially used a dedicated horse and cart fleet to move raw ingredients into and produce out of the factory. Dedicated warehouses adjacent to the canal were constructed, in a development known as Waterside Wharf, accessed by a road bridge over the BWSR and canal known as Bournville Way.

In light of increasing production, railway sidings were first laid into the Bournville factory in 1884, resulting in the purchase of a single steam locomotive. As the factory's access to the canal still lay on the far side of the BWSR tracks, a dedicated railway bridge was constructed in 1925 over the BWSR and canal to allow access into what then became called Waterside Wharf and Sidings.

At its height, the Bournville Works Railway ran to some 6 miles (9.7 km) in length. There were extensive rail lines within the works, which with tight radii limited maximum vehicle wheelbase to twin axles on a maximum 7 feet 6 inches (2.29 m) length. The exchange sidings with the BWSR consisted of two parallel loops, at the north end of which was an extension spur containing a weighbridge. The wheelbase limit meant that the ideal locomotive was an 0-4-0, which were steam fired by coke due to its cleaner burning capabilities, highly important in a food factory. The company owned up to six private locomotives, initially steam powered and finally replaced by diesel, which marshalled three outbound trains every day except Sundays.

Eventually, the cost and shipping advantages of road over rail became clear, and the last train left the sidings on 28 May 1976. Cadbury No. 1, an 0-4-0T locomotive made by the Avonside Engine Company in 1925, was donated to the Birmingham Railway Museum in Tyseley where as of 2010 it was stored awaiting an overhaul to operational condition.

== Bournville engine shed ==
After the development of the Stirchley Street and Bournville to Kings Norton Deviation in 1885, Bournville shed was constructed on the now redundant land south of Bournville station. Although a sub-shed to Saltley by being given the code 21B, in anticipation of the traffic levels, it was a standard scale Midland Railway roundhouse, equipped with a 50 feet (15 m) turntable, water tank and sand oven. In the yard to replenish and maintain the initial allocation of 25 locomotives, there was a coal stage, two water cranes and ash disposal facilities.

However, throughout its life, Bournville never met the traffic expectations with which it was built. Freight traffic came from the three trains a day from Cadburys, and the Central Goods Station. Passenger services after an initial allocation to London were mainly suburban or county level, with servicing of the BWSR itself as well as the Lifford Loop circulars, those onto the Halesowen Joint Line, locals to Evesham and Ashchurch, and mainline stopping services from Birmingham to Bristol. As a result, Bournville was often allocated end of life locomotives, which when needing major services were then stored pending disposal on the many empty lines.

An inevitable decline began with the closure of the Lifford Loop stations from 1930, which were demolished during the Second World War. In 1956, an engine fell into the turntable pit, resulting in temporary closure of the roundhouse and making the shed dependent on Saltley and Bromsgrove for boiler washouts. The turntable was repaired and reinstated, but despite this investment, the shed was officially closed on 14 February 1960. The last in service locomotive officially to leave was BR Black Five 4-6-0 No 44843. Demolition of the buildings began in November 1961, and today the site is an industrial estate.

== Bibliography ==
- Boynton, John (1993). Rails Across The City, The Story of The Birmingham Cross City Line. Kidderminster: Mid England Books. ISBN 0-9522248-0-1.
