= Five Ways railway station =

Railway station in Birmingham, England

Five Ways
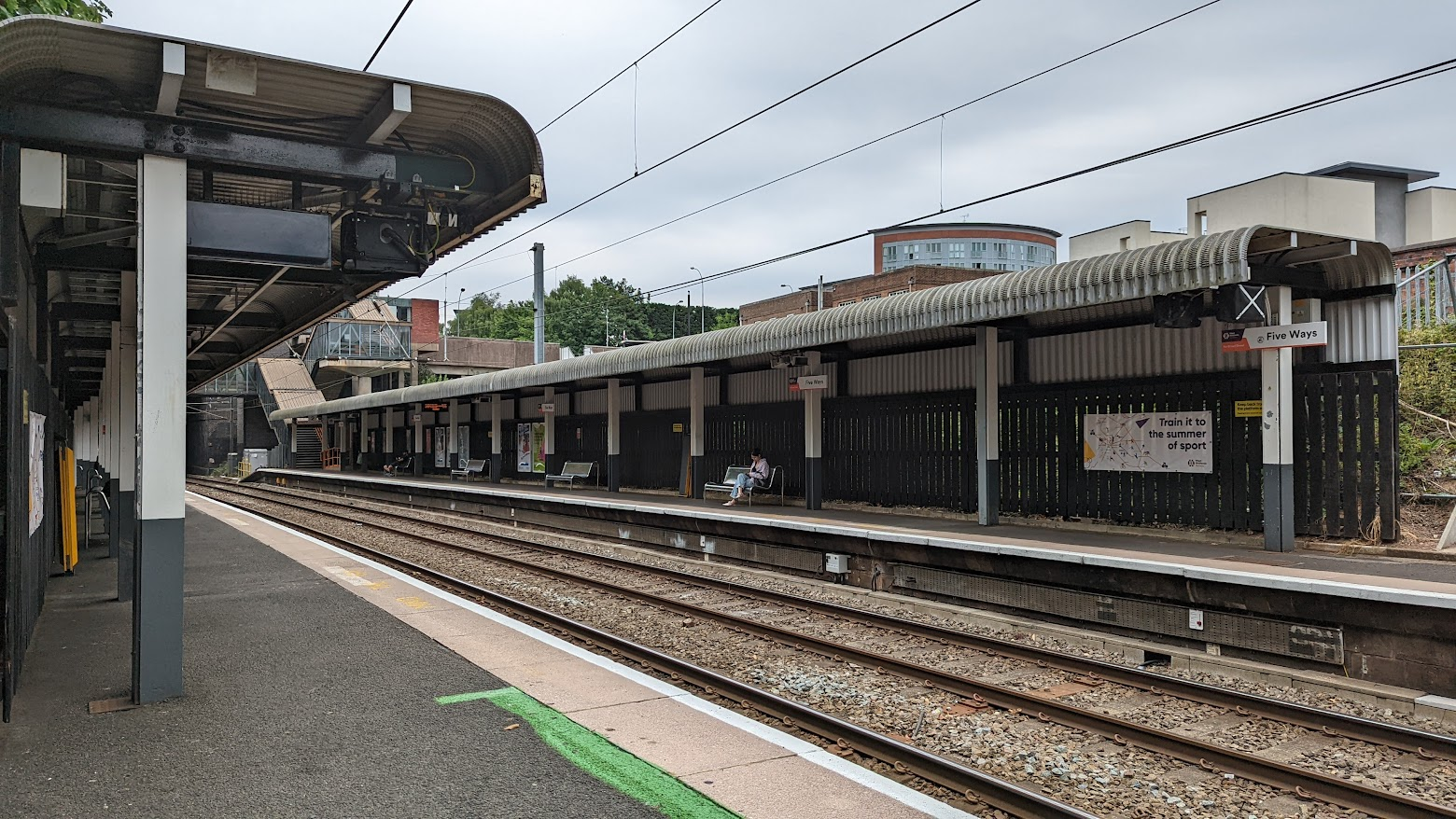

General information
- Location: Five Ways, Birmingham; England
- Coordinates: 52.4713°N 1.9129°W
- Grid reference: SP059858
- Manager: West Midlands Railway
- Transit authority: Transport for West Midlands
- Platforms: 2

Other information
- Station code: FWY
- Fare zone: 1
- Classification: DfT category D

Key dates
- 1885: Opened
- 1944: Temporary Closure
- 1950: Official Closure
- 1978: Reopened

Passengers
- 2021/22: ▲1.171 million
- 2022/23: ▲1.459 million
- 2023/24: ▼1.385 million
- 2024/25: ▼1.302 million
- 2025/26: ▼1.251 million
Location
Notes
- Passenger statistics from the Office of Rail and Road

Five Ways railway station is a railway station serving the Five Ways and Lee Bank areas of Birmingham, England. It is situated on the Cross-City Line.

The original Five Ways station operated between 1885 and 1944. The station was reopened in 1978 when the Cross-City line services were created.

== History ==
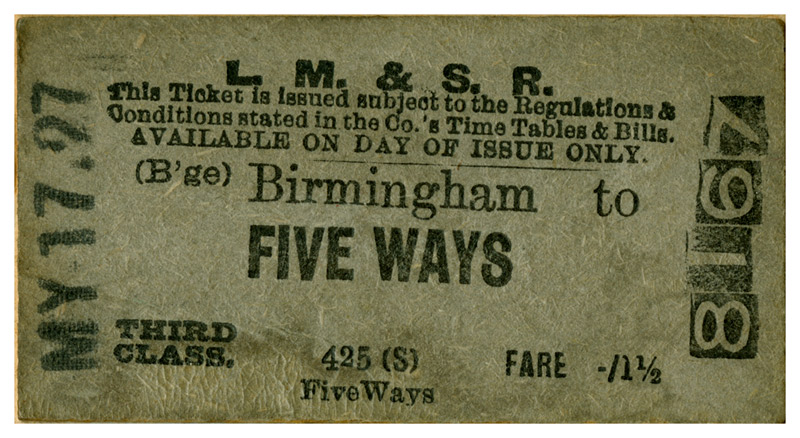
LMS Birmingham to Five Ways train ticket, issued on 17 May 1927

The original station was opened in 1885 by the Midland Railway, when the Birmingham West Suburban Railway (BWSR) was extended into Birmingham New Street. It fell prey to competition from local bus services, and services were suspended in 1944, as a wartime economy measure, under the auspices of the London, Midland and Scottish Railway. The closure was made permanent by British Railways in 1950.

Alongside the station was the spur line leading to Central Goods station. The junction to this line was just south of Five Ways. The spur was part of the original alignment of the BWSR, leading to its original terminus at Granville Street. Following the closure of Granville Street in 1885, the spur line was extended to run to Central Goods station, which remained open until the late 1960s.

=== Reopening ===
The station was rebuilt and reopened in 1978 to the designs of the architect John Broome as part of the creation of the Cross-City Line services. Built with its main entrance on Islington Row Middleway. British Rail also carried out electrification of the lines through the station in 1993.

Ticket barriers were installed at the start of 2009 and became operational shortly before the end of April in the same year.

The station achieved a milestone in 2009–10 by having over 1 million "entries and exits", according to the Office of Rail and Road’s station usage estimates.

== Local attractions ==
Five Ways is the nearest railway station to Birmingham Botanical Gardens, Edgbaston Cricket Ground and the Birmingham Oratory.

== Services ==
The station is served by West Midlands Trains with local Transport for West Midlands branded "Cross-City" services, operated using Class 730 EMUs.

The off-peak service pattern is as follows:

Mondays to Saturdays:

- 4 trains per hour (tph) northbound to Four Oaks, via Birmingham New Street and Sutton Coldfield
  - Of which:
    - 2 tph continue to Lichfield Trent Valley
- 4 tph southbound to Longbridge, via University
  - Of which:
    - 2 tph continue to Redditch
    - 2 tph continue to Bromsgrove

Preceding station	National Rail	Following station
Birmingham New Street	West Midlands Railway; Lichfield – Four Oaks – Birmingham – Bromsgrove/Redditch; Cross-City Line	University

== Connections ==
The station is an interchange for trams at Five Ways tram stop on the West Midlands Metro, which is approximately 0.4 miles (0.64 km) away, roughly an eight minute walk.
