= Shenstone railway station =

Railway station in Staffordshire, England

Shenstone
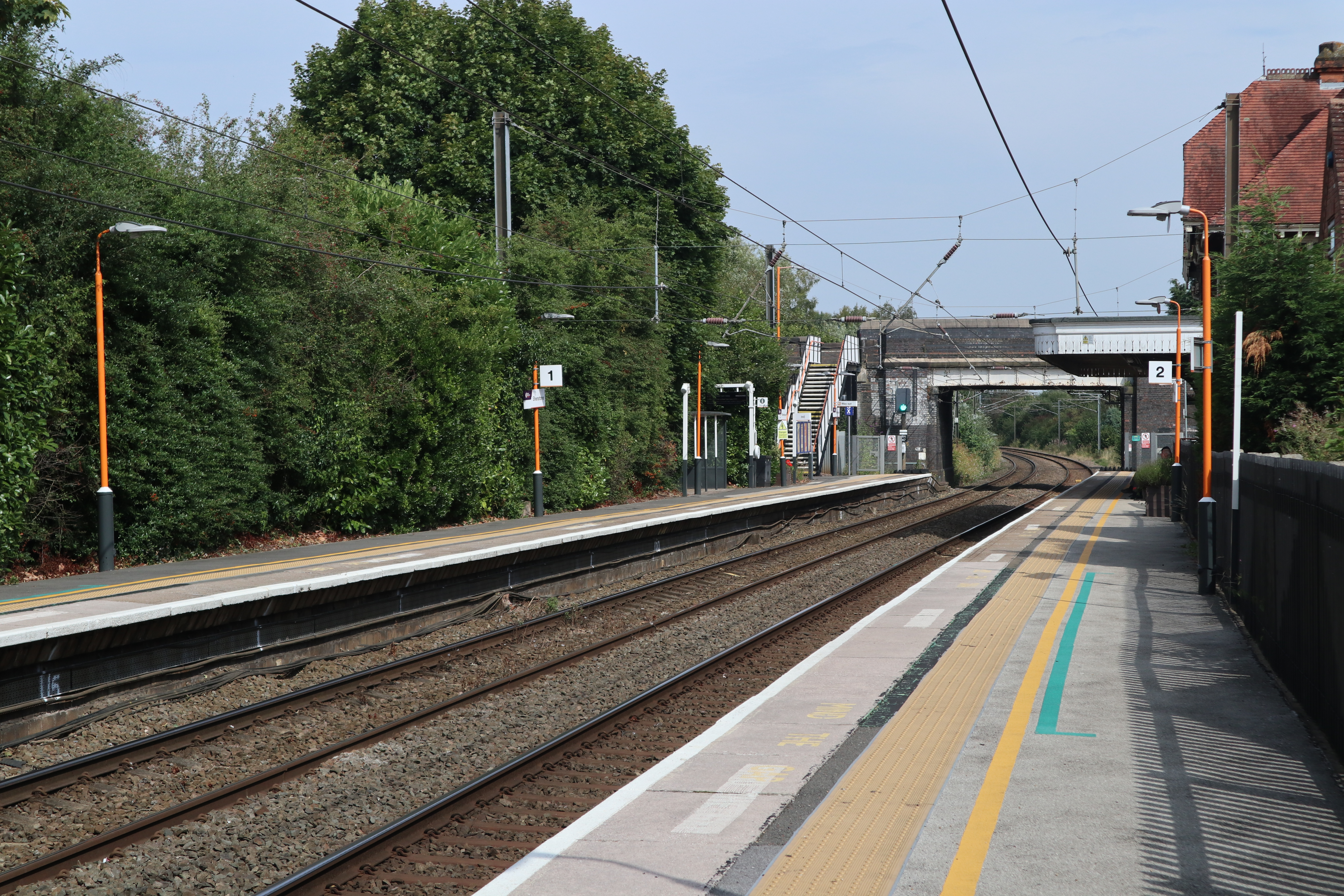
- Shenstone station pictured in August 2024

General information
- Location: Shenstone, Staffordshire; England
- Coordinates: 52.639°N 1.844°W
- Grid reference: SK106046
- Manager: West Midlands Railway
- Platforms: 2

Other information
- Station code: SEN
- Classification: DfT category E

History
- Opened: 1884

Key dates
- 1964: Closed to goods

Passengers
- 2021/22: ▲91,782
- 2022/23: ▲0.130 million
- 2023/24: ▲0.142 million
- 2024/25: ▲0.250 million
- 2025/26: ▼0.197 million
Location
Notes
- Passenger statistics from the Office of Rail and Road

Shenstone railway station serves the village of Shenstone, in Staffordshire, England. It is a stop on the Cross-City Line between Bromsgrove/Redditch, Birmingham New Street and Lichfield Trent Valley.

== History ==
Shenstone station was opened in 1884, when the London and North Western Railway extended their Birmingham to Sutton Coldfield line northwards to Lichfield.

== Services ==
The station is served by West Midlands Railway, with local Transport for West Midlands branded Cross-City services, operated using Class 730 electric multiple units.

The off-peak service pattern is as follows:

Mondays to Saturdays:

- 2 tph (trains per hour) northbound to Lichfield Trent Valley, via Lichfield City, departing from platform 1
- 2 tph southbound to Bromsgrove, via Sutton Coldfield, Birmingham New Street and University, departing from platform 2.

Sundays:

- 2 tph northbound to Lichfield Trent Valley.
- 2 tph southbound to Redditch, calling at all stations.

The average journey time to Lichfield City is around 5 minutes and to Birmingham New Street is around 32 minutes.

Preceding station	National Rail	Following station
Lichfield City	West Midlands Railway; Lichfield – Birmingham – Bromsgrove/Redditch; Cross-City Line	Blake Street
