= Bournville railway station =

Railway station in the West Midlands, England

Bournville
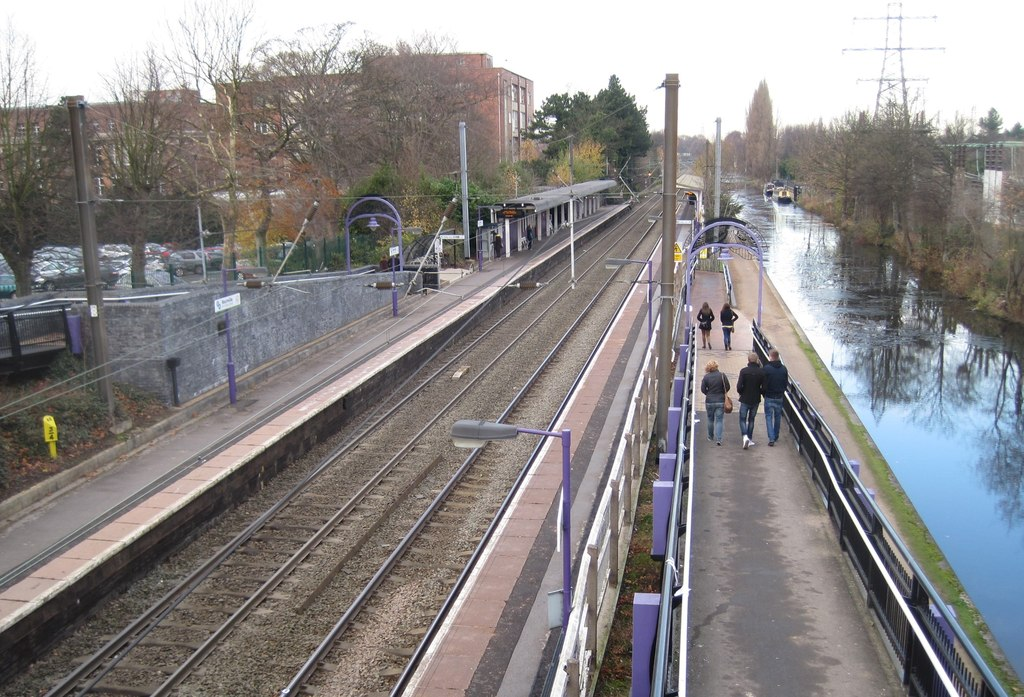
- Bournville station looking north, alongside the Worcester and Birmingham Canal.

General information
- Location: Bournville, Birmingham, England
- Coordinates: 52.427°N 1.926°W
- Grid reference: SP050810
- Manager: West Midlands Railway
- Transit authority: Transport for West Midlands
- Platforms: 2

Other information
- Station code: BRV
- Fare zone: 3
- Classification: DfT category D

Key dates
- 3 April 1876: Opened as Stirchley Street
- 1880: Renamed Stirchley Street and Bournville
- 1885: Line doubled
- 1904: Renamed Bournville
- 1978: Rebuilt

Passengers
- 2021/22: ▲0.511 million
- 2022/23: ▲0.702 million
- 2023/24: ▲0.862 million
- 2024/25: ▲0.996 million
- 2025/26: ▲1.059 million
Location
Notes
- Passenger statistics from the Office of Rail and Road

Bournville railway station serves the Bournville area of Birmingham, in the West Midlands, England. It is on the Cross-City Line, which runs from Redditch/Bromsgrove to Lichfield Trent Valley, via Birmingham New Street.

== History ==
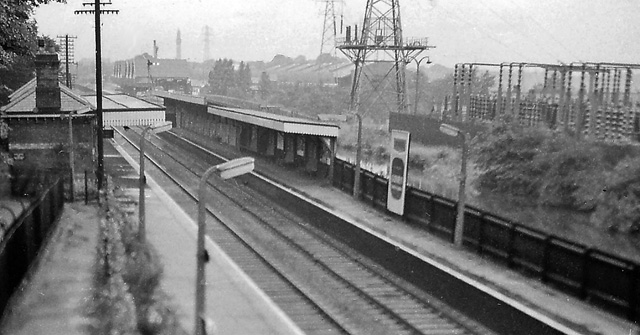
Bournville station in 1962

The station opened on 3 April 1876 as the temporary southern terminus of the Birmingham West Suburban Railway, while the difficult construction of the junction with the Birmingham and Gloucester Railway was completed at Kings Norton. Stirchley Street opened as a single platform with later added run around loop. In an initial land rental agreement with the Worcester and Birmingham Canal, the station sits above Bournville Lane, as the tracks are on an embankment, shared with the canal.

With the opening of the Cadbury Bournville factory in 1879, the station was renamed Stirchley Street and Bournville in 1880. After an improved through connection was developed to the Birmingham and Gloucester at Kings Norton in 1885, the railway track to Birmingham was doubled along its lines entire length as the line was extended into Birmingham New Street. This necessitated the construction of a southbound platform between the line and the canal, resulting in a narrow platform. In 1904, the station was finally renamed Bournville.

The station did not have goods facilities, but north of its location were the exchange sidings with the 6 miles (9.7 km) of the Bournville Works Railway; south of it there was a Midland Railway developed roundhouse engine shed, which opened in 1895 and closed in 1961. The station area has changed considerably since the Midland Railway days and lost virtually all its original features as the station was completely rebuilt by British Rail in 1978 to the designs of the architect John Broome along with the others on this line when the Cross-City route was commissioned. Prior to the rebuild, the station had only received a limited service (mainly at peak hours) for much of the 1960s and 1970s. The line was electrified in 1993.

== Facilities ==
The Cadbury chocolate factory is still adjacent to the station, reflected in the fact that Bournville station is partly painted in Cadbury purple. Station signs include the famous Cadbury logo, a reflection of it providing ideal access for Cadbury World.

Bournville station is equipped with real-time information departure boards. Both platforms have step-free access (by means of a ramp) from the Mary Vale Road entrance. The main station entrance, via the ticket office on Bournville Lane, only provides access to the platforms via steep steps. There is a ticket machine on platform 1 (for trains towards Birmingham New Street) for the benefit of passengers who enter the station via the step-free entrance.

== Services ==
The station currently only serves trains of the Cross City Line; all services are operated by Class 730 electric multiple units.

West Midlands Railway operates the following off-peak service pattern, in trains per hour (tph):

- 4 tph northbound to Four Oaks, via University, Birmingham New Street and Sutton Coldfield; of which:
  - 2 tph continue to Lichfield Trent Valley
- 4 tph southbound to Longbridge; of which:
  - 2 tph continue to Redditch
  - 2 tph continue to Bromsgrove

Preceding station	National Rail	Following station
Selly Oak	West Midlands Railway; Lichfield – Four Oaks – Birmingham – Bromsgrove/Redditch; Cross-City Line	Kings Norton
