= Lichfield City railway station =

Railway station in Staffordshire, England

Coordinates: 52.68017°N 1.82571°W

Lichfield City
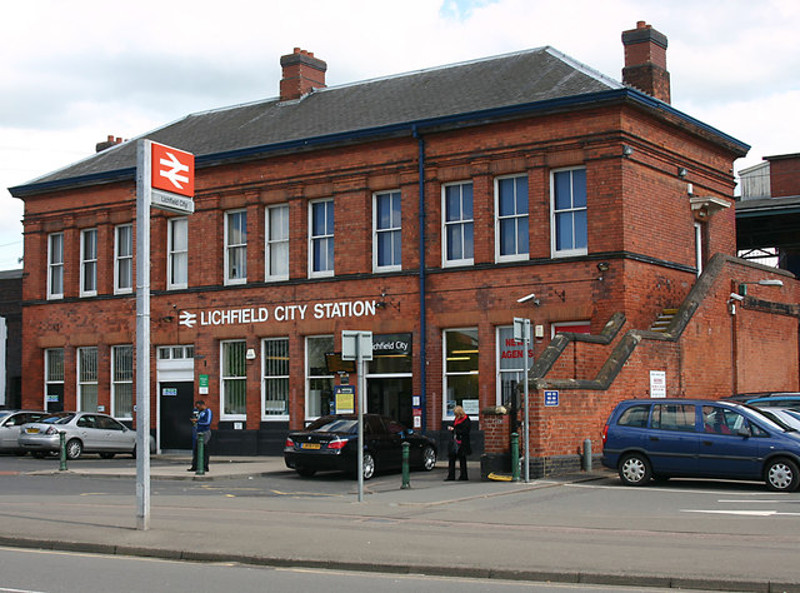

General information
- Location: Lichfield, Lichfield District; England
- Grid reference: SK119091
- Manager: West Midlands Railway
- Platforms: 2

Other information
- Station code: LIC
- Classification: DfT category D

Key dates
- 1849: First station opened
- 3 November 1884: Resited

Passengers
- 2021/22: ▲0.488 million
- 2022/23: ▲0.633 million
- 2023/24: ▲0.751 million
- 2024/25: ▲0.777 million
- 2025/26: ▲0.871 million
Location
Notes
- Passenger statistics from the Office of Rail and Road

Lichfield City is one of two railway stations serving the cathedral city of Lichfield, in Staffordshire, England. It is situated in the city centre, whilst Lichfield Trent Valley station is on the eastern outskirts. City station is a stop towards the northern end of the Cross-City Line, 17 1/4 miles (27.8 km) north-east of Birmingham New Street. The station and all trains serving it are operated by West Midlands Railway.

== History ==
=== Early years ===
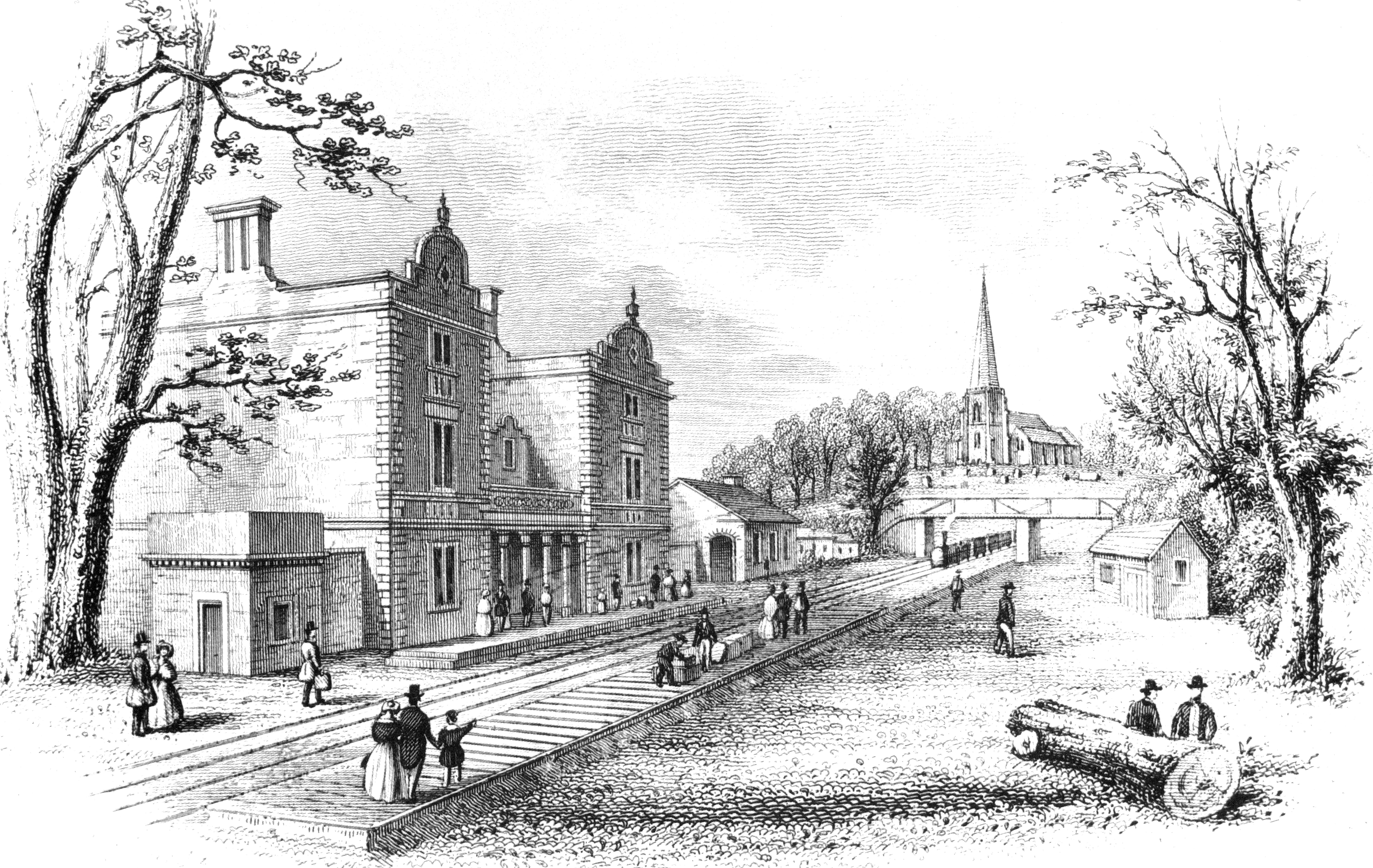
Lichfield City station in 1849

The station opened in 1849, on the South Staffordshire Railway's line from Lichfield Trent Valley to Walsall and Dudley; this later became part of the London and North Western Railway. The architect for the South Staffordshire Railway was Mr Edward Adams of London and the station building, built in 1849, was a modest creation in a Tudor style, with tall gables and chimneys.

Services to Birmingham began in 1884, when a branch to Sutton Coldfield opened, connecting with an earlier LNWR line. This original station was demolished in 1882, when the present one was built to accommodate these additional services. The original station stood further east than the present one. It was approached from the city by a path which ran across Levett's Field and up some brick steps in front of the station, these can still be seen near the present fire station.

=== Recent history ===
Passenger trains northwards to Burton-on-Trent, via Trent Valley station, ceased in January 1965, along with trains to Walsall. Lichfield City became the northern terminus of the line from Birmingham, which later became part of the Cross-City Line. In 1988, under British Rail, the line was extended back to Trent Valley. Lichfield City has retained considerable character.

The line to Walsall closed subsequently to all traffic in March 1984, except for the section as far as Anglesey sidings (near Hammerwich), which was retained to serve a Charringtons oil terminal. Traffic from there ceased in 2002 and the line has been disused since then, although the track remains intact.

In June 1990, the station was in the news after a trainee soldier, William Robert Davies, aged 19, was shot and killed by two Provisional IRA gunmen; two other new recruits were wounded, whilst they were awaiting a train to Birmingham. A plaque commemorating the incident is situated in the station.

== Facilities ==
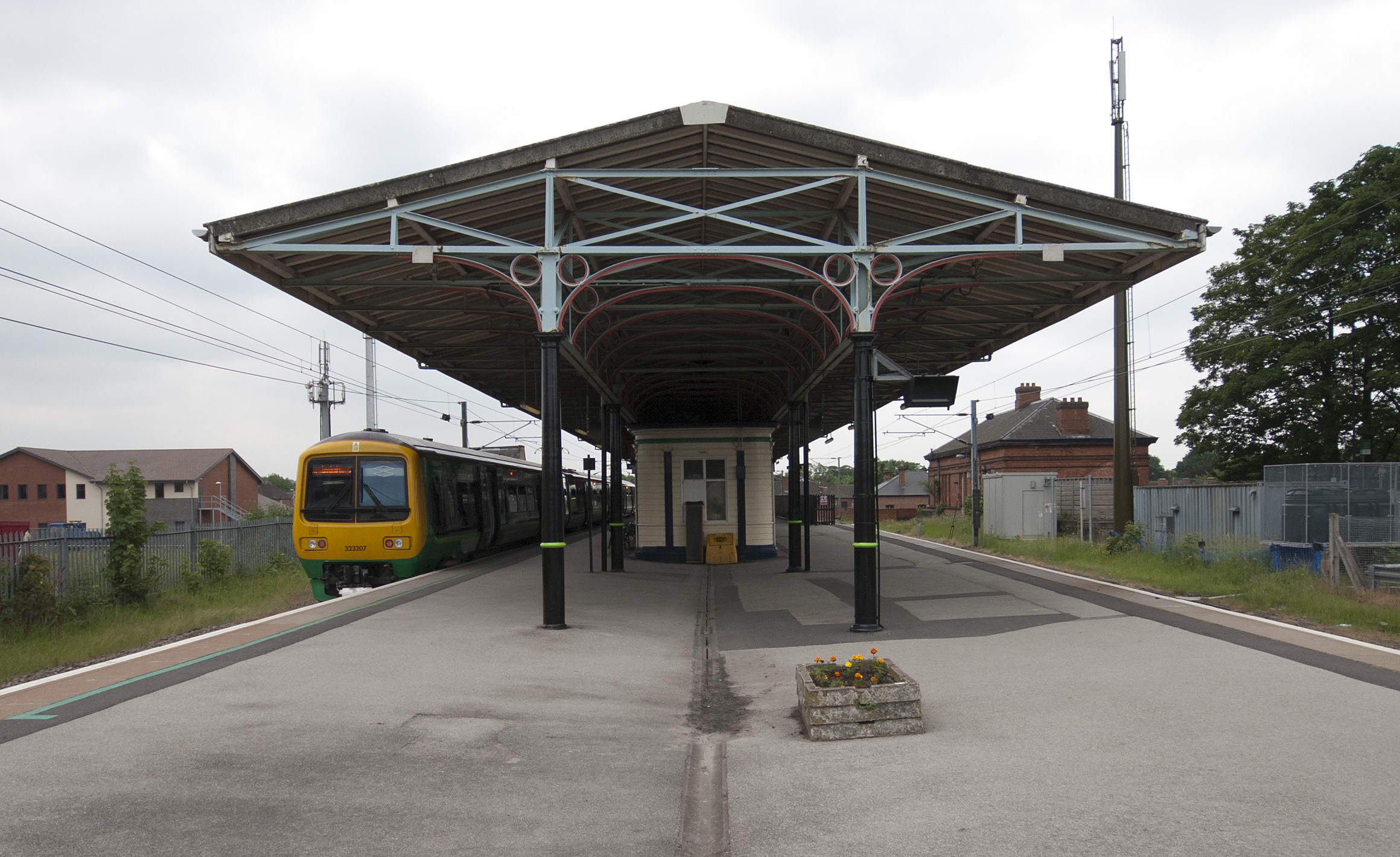
The station platform

The station has a staffed ticket office, located at street level on Station Road; this is open throughout the week from early morning until mid-evening. A self-service ticket machine is also provided in the ticket hall for use when the ticket office is closed or for collecting pre-paid tickets.

At platform level, there are toilets and a waiting room. Customer help points, CIS displays and automated announcements provide train running information. Step-free access is available to both the ticket hall and platforms (the latter via lift from the subway).

== Services ==
The station is served by West Midlands Railway, with local Transport for West Midlands branded Cross-City services, currently operated with Class 730 electric multiple units.

The off-peak service pattern is as follows:

Mondays to Saturdays:

- 2 tph (trains per hour) northbound to Lichfield Trent Valley only, departing from platform 1.
- 2 tph southbound to Bromsgrove, via Sutton Coldfield, Birmingham New Street and University, departing from platform 2.

Sundays:

- 2 tph northbound to Lichfield Trent Valley only.
- 2 tph southbound to Redditch, calling at all stations.

The average journey time to Lichfield Trent Valley is around 3 minutes and to Birmingham New Street is around 36 minutes.

Preceding station	National Rail	Following station
Lichfield Trent Valley	West Midlands Railway; Lichfield – Birmingham – Bromsgrove/Redditch; Cross-City Line	Shenstone
Terminus	West Midlands Railway; Lichfield – Birmingham – Bromsgrove/Redditch; Cross-City Line	Shenstone
Historical railways
Lichfield Trent Valley Line and station open	London and North Western Railway South Staffordshire line	Hammerwich Line and station closed

== The South Staffordshire Line ==
The South Staffordshire Line from Lichfield Trent Valley to Burton on Trent is often used for diversions when the route via Tamworth is closed for engineering work, as well as for occasional freight trains and empty stock transfers.

The line from Walsall to Lichfield has been identified as a "disused rail corridor" in a strategy conducted by the West Midlands Combined Authority; this means that there a long-term ambition to reopen this line as either a heavy or light rail corridor. There are also aspirations to reconnect the disused line at Wednesbury to Walsall, as either a rail or tram line.

Consideration is also being given to the reintroduction of train services to Burton and Derby. Services north of Lichfield City currently terminate at Trent Valley station; the line beyond is only used by freight for access to the Barton train maintenance depot, occasional CrossCountry services and as a diversionary route. A short-term option may be a diesel shuttle service, with longer-term ambitions to electrify the line and provide stations at Barton Under Needwood and Alrewas.

== Railway/road bridge ==
Immediately adjacent to the station is a bridge which carries the rail lines over the busy A51. The bridge is frequently struck by heavy goods traffic on the road below, forcing rail traffic to and from Shenstone to reduce speed over the bridge as a safety precaution. The bridge is the fourth most struck bridge in the country.
