= Selly Oak railway station =

Rail station in Birmingham, England

Selly Oak
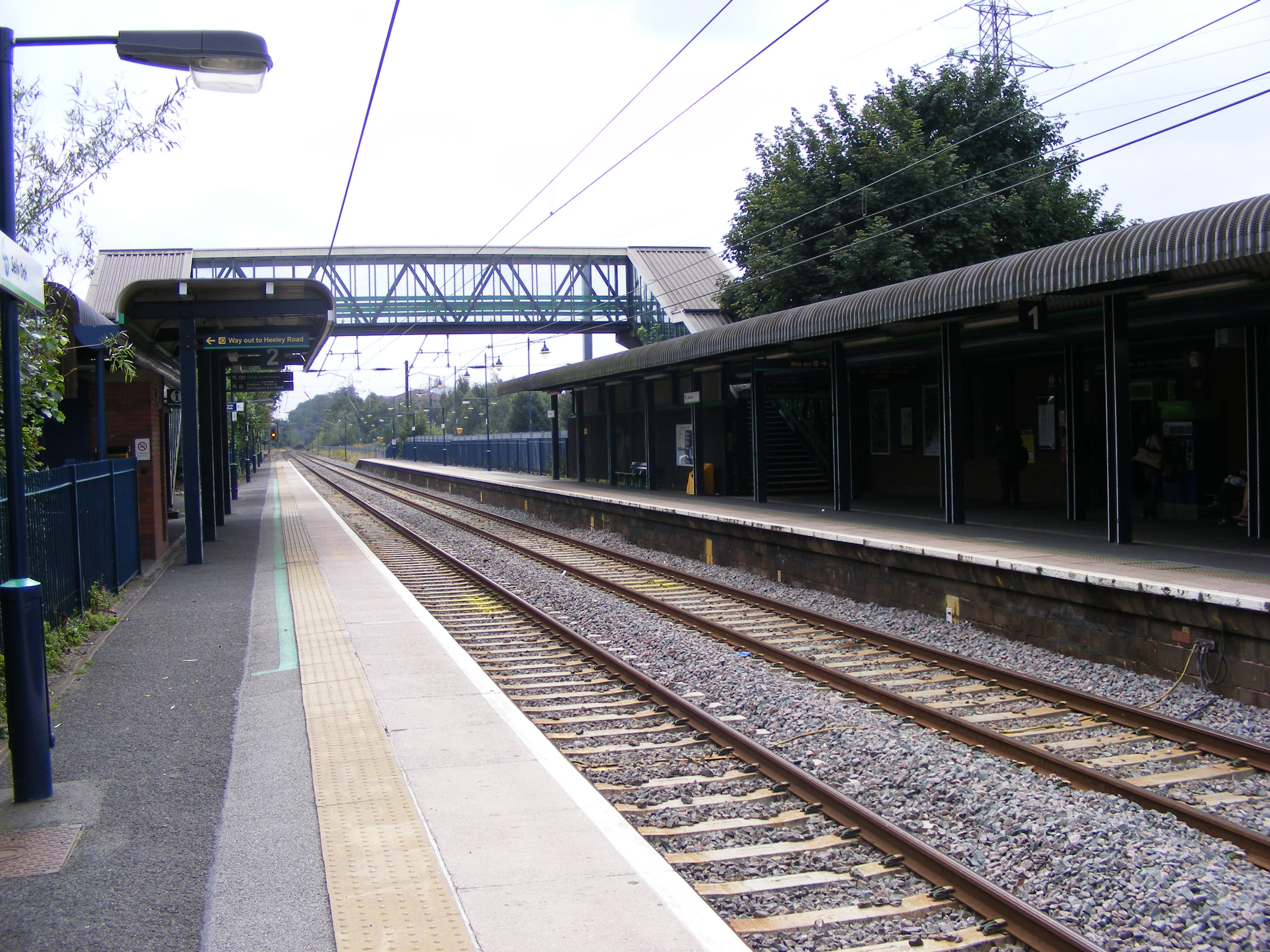

General information
- Location: Selly Oak, Birmingham; England
- Coordinates: 52.441°N 1.935°W
- Grid reference: SP044826
- Manager: West Midlands Railway
- Transit authority: Transport for West Midlands
- Platforms: 2

Other information
- Station code: SLY
- Fare zone: 2
- Classification: DfT category D

History
- Original company: Midland Railway
- Post-grouping: London, Midland and Scottish Railway

Key dates
- 3 April 1876: Opened as Selly Oak and Bournbrook
- 1904: Renamed Selly Oak
- 1978: Rebuilt

Passengers
- 2021/22: ▲1.590 million
- 2022/23: ▲1.995 million
- 2023/24: ▲2.187 million
- 2024/25: ▲2.309 million
- 2025/26: ▲2.486 million
Location
Notes
- Passenger statistics from the Office of Rail and Road

Selly Oak railway station is a railway station in Selly Oak in Birmingham, England, on the Cross-City Line between Redditch, Birmingham and Lichfield.

== History ==
It opened on 3 April 1876 on the Midland Railway's Birmingham West Suburban Railway branch to serve the burgeoning suburbs of Selly Oak and Bournbrook. The entrance to the station was on Heeley Road.

On 20 August 1883, a goods train from Granville Street to Lifford was passing over the bridge over the canal at Selly Oak station when at a speed of 15 miles per hour (24 km/h) it derailed and damaged much of the wooden railing of the bridge. The engine remained on the bridge, but two of the wagons broke through the wooden fencing and tumbled down the embankment.

Originally built as a single track line, the route through Selly Oak was doubled between 1883 and 1885 when the Midland Railway connected the northern end of the line through to Birmingham New Street station. The viaduct north of the station which carried the old line over the canal and then the Bristol Road could not be widened so it was replaced on a new alignment. The railway crossed the canal with a new bridge consisting of two principal girders 126 feet (38 m) long, weighing 47 long tons (48,000 kg) each. The bridge over the Bristol Road was built to the north of the existing bridge and comprised a 60 feet (18 m) iron span over the road weighing around 450 long tons (460,000 kg). The line continued on its deviation north of the original line until ¼ mile south of Selly Oak station where a new shorter viaduct was reached. Selly Oak station was rebuilt on the new alignment with platforms 150 yards (140 m) long and a subway at the Birmingham end of the station. The new station buildings on the up platform comprised a central booking hall with waiting rooms for ladies and gentlemen on either side, and offices and porters' room. The down platform had a simple waiting room.

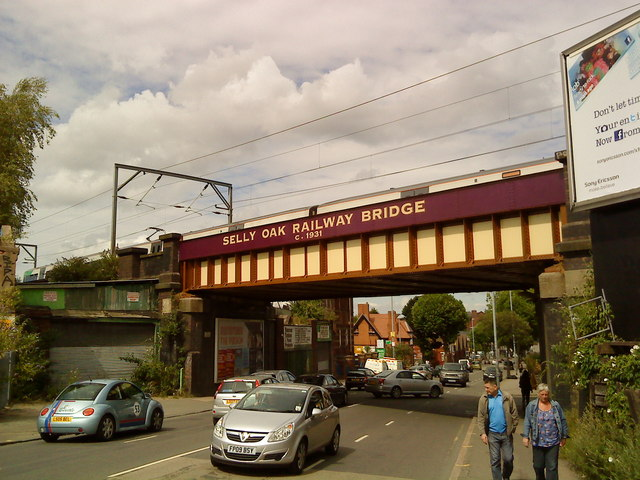
The new bridge over the Bristol Road at Selly Oak dating from 1931

The bridge over the Bristol Road was replaced in 1931 by the L.M.S. The new bridge weighed about 200 long tons (200,000 kg), with the two side girders alone weighing 35 long tons (36,000 kg) each.

The station area has changed considerably since the Midland Railway days and lost virtually all its original features as the station was completely rebuilt by British Rail in 1978 to designs of the architect John Broome along with the others on this line when the Cross-City route was commissioned. Prior to the rebuild, the station had only received a limited service (mainly at peak hours) for much of the 1960s and 1970s.

On 11 April 1993, a railway employee at the station was threatened with sticks and two masked men stole takings of hundreds of pounds. The station received a £85,000 (equivalent to £182,900 in 2025) facelift in 1994 with the number of car park spaces expanded from 50 to 86, new lighting, fencing and closed circuit TV

== Facilities ==
The site has recently been expanded with the addition of a new car park with 93 free spaces, making Selly Oak station a new Park and Ride site. The station and line are on an embankment.

Pedestrian and vehicular access to the station is via Bristol Rd (B384) on the northbound side, and via Heeley Rd on the southbound side. Access between platforms is via a covered overhead bridge, with lifts available. The overhead bridge has views of Bournbrook, The University of Birmingham and the city centre itself.

The station is equipped with real-time information departure boards which were previously installed in 2006 by former Cross City Line franchise holder Central Trains. There are automated ticket machines and windowed ticket booths.

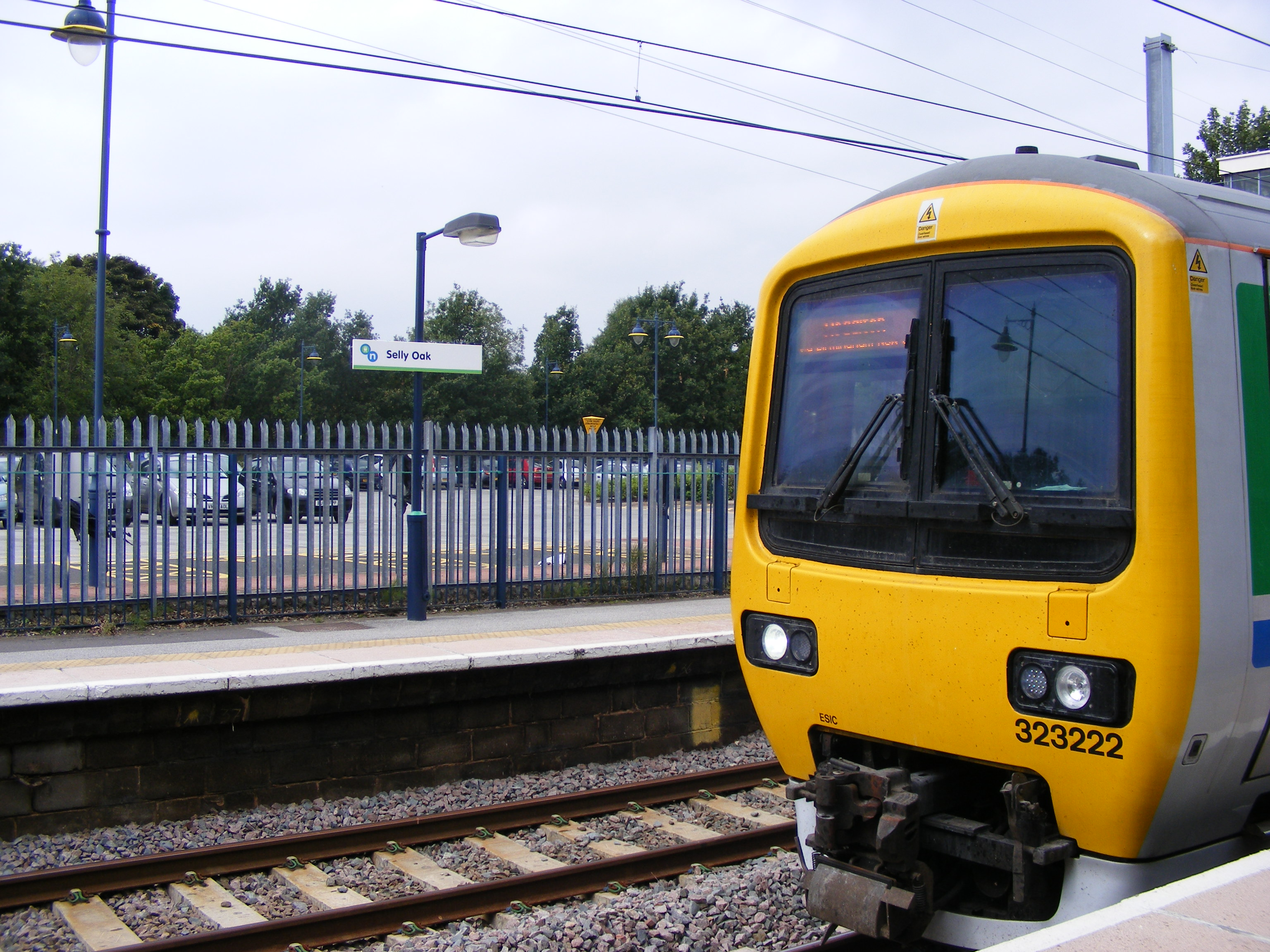
A Centro livery Class 323 at Selly Oak in 2008

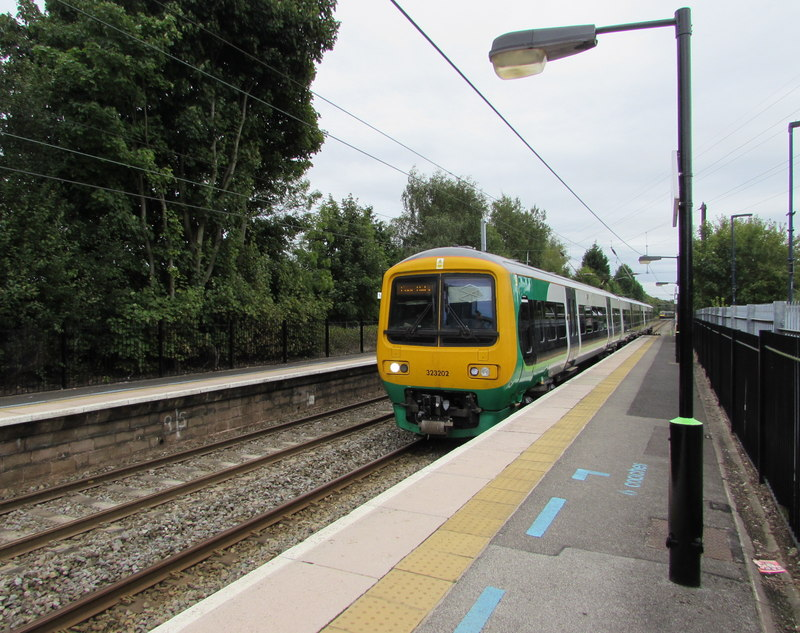
A London Midland Class 323 arrives at Selly Oak in 2016

== Services ==
The station is served by West Midlands Trains with local Transport for West Midlands branded "Cross-City" services, operated using Class 730 EMUs.

The off-peak service pattern is as follows:

Mondays to Saturdays:

- 4 tph northbound to Four Oaks, via University, Birmingham New Street and Sutton Coldfield
  - Of which:
    - 2 tph continue to Lichfield Trent Valley
- 4 tph southbound to Longbridge
  - Of which:
    - 2 tph continue to Redditch
    - 2 tph continue to Bromsgrove

Preceding station	National Rail	Following station
University	West Midlands Railway; Lichfield – Four Oaks – Birmingham – Bromsgrove/Redditch; Cross-City Line	Bournville
	Historical railways	
Somerset Road; Line open, station closed	Midland Railway; Birmingham West Suburban Railway	Stirchley Street; Line and station (now Bournville) open
