= Somerset Road railway station =

Former railway station in England

Somerset Road

General information
- Location: Edgbaston, Birmingham; England
- Coordinates: 52.4577°N 1.9283°W
- Grid reference: SP049844
- Platforms: 2

Other information
- Status: Disused

History
- Pre-grouping: Midland Railway
- Post-grouping: London, Midland and Scottish Railway

Key dates
- 1876: Opened
- 1930: Closed
Location

Somerset Road railway station was a railway station in Edgbaston, Birmingham, England, on the Midland Railway's Birmingham West Suburban Railway. The station had two platforms and was located in a cutting.

== History ==
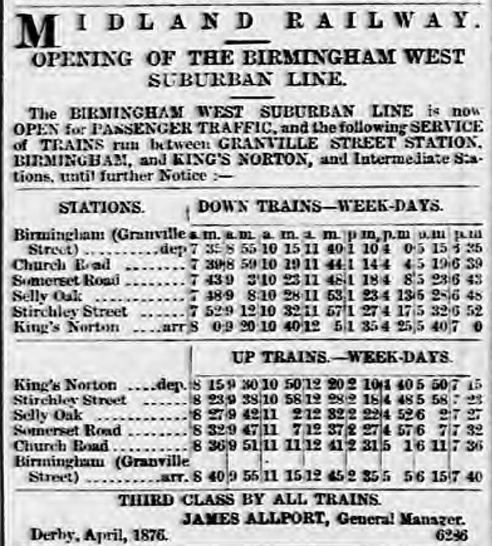
Timetable from Aris's Birmingham Gazette, 8 April 1876

It was opened in 1876.

On 14 May 1897, John Thomas Johnson ran down the incline to the platform, but was unable to stop on reaching the platform and fell in front of the advancing train. Part of his left foot was cut off and his head was injured. He survived the accident.

On 16 February 1901, George Grainger attempted to alight from a train before it had pulled up at Somerset Road station and fell between the footboard and the platform. He was crushed to death.

It closed in 1930 due to lack of patronage.

== Remains ==
There are virtually no remains of the station, the only one being a bricked up entrance on the Somerset Road bridge over the present Cross-City Line, between the University railway station and Five Ways railway station.

Preceding station	Historical railways	Following station
Church Road; Line open, station closed	Midland Railway; Birmingham West Suburban Railway	Selly Oak; Line and station open
