= Granville Street railway station =

Former railway station in Birmingham, England

Granville Street
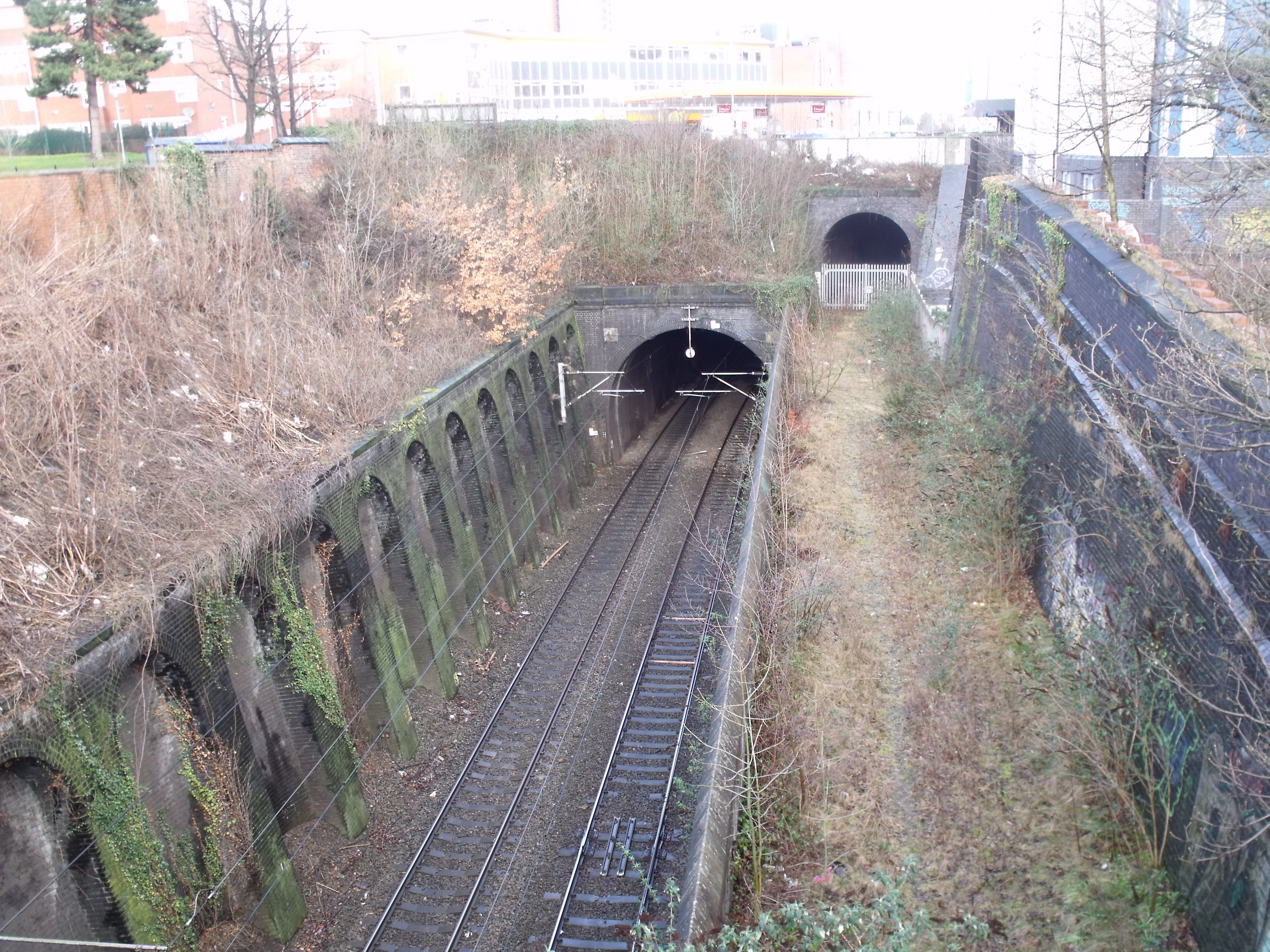
- Trackbed of the disused spur line near the site of the former station, over the cutting of the replacement line

General information
- Location: Birmingham, Birmingham; England
- Coordinates: 52.474594°N 1.908859°W
- Grid reference: SP062862
- Platforms: 1

Other information
- Status: Disused

History
- Original company: Birmingham West Suburban Railway
- Pre-grouping: Midland Railway

Key dates
- 1876: Opened
- 1885: Closed
Location

Granville Street railway station was a railway station in Birmingham, England. It was the original terminus of the Midland Railway's Birmingham West Suburban Railway (BWSR).

== History ==
The station operated between 1876 and 1885. Although no known photographs of the station survive, it was described as having a single platform, with wooden buildings and a run around loop.

The original intended terminus for the BWSR was to have been at a station called Suffolk Street, which would have been to the north of the Worcester and Birmingham Canal and closer to the centre of Birmingham, reached by a viaduct crossing the canal. As the promoters were unable to raise the funds to build the viaduct, the terminus was cut back to Granville Street station to the south of the canal.

It was an isolated terminus, on the edge of the city-centre, with no connection to the rest of the railway network, and so the Midland Railway (which had taken over the BWSR) decided to extend the line into New Street station, double the track, and integrate the BWSR into their wider network. As Granville Street was at a higher elevation than New Street, a new line had to be constructed alongside at a lower level, through deep brick lined cuttings and several tunnels, once this was complete, the station became redundant and closed. Most traces of the station were removed by 1887 when the now spur line was extended via a tunnel under the canal to create Central Goods railway station, much of the trackbed of this former spur is still visible.

Preceding station	Historical railways	Following station
Terminus; Line closed, station closed	Midland Railway; Birmingham West Suburban Railway	Church Road; Line closed, station closed
