= Church Road railway station =

Former railway station in Birmingham, England

Church Road
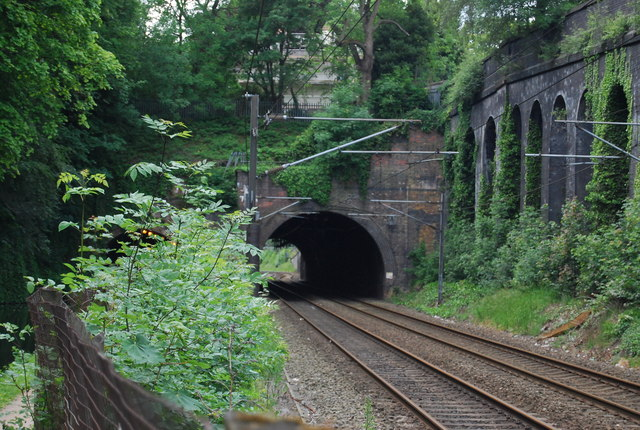
- Site of the station in 2011

General information
- Location: Edgbaston, Birmingham; England
- Coordinates: 52.4661°N 1.9210°W
- Grid reference: SP054853
- Platforms: 2

Other information
- Status: Disused

History
- Pre-grouping: Midland Railway
- Post-grouping: London, Midland and Scottish Railway

Key dates
- 1876: Opened
- 1925: Closed
Location

Church Road railway station was a railway station in Edgbaston, Birmingham, England, on the Midland Railway's Birmingham West Suburban Railway.

== History ==
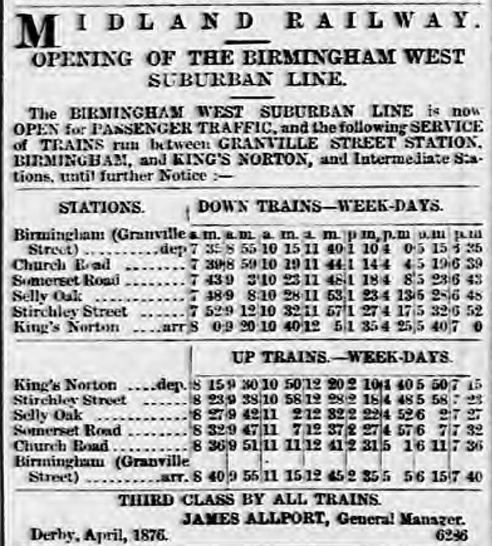
Timetable from Aris's Birmingham Gazette, 8 April 1876

The station, which was located in a cutting at the mouth of a short tunnel, operated between 1876 and 1925, before closing due to lack of patronage. Although the line remains open, almost no trace now remains of the station.

On 7 July 1906 a passenger, Charles White, and his stepfather arrived at the station and purchased tickets for Birmingham New Street. As there was some time to wait for the train, they left the station and went into Carpenter Road. They were later observed on the southbound platform, and the elder man was struggling with Charles White, as if to restrain him from crossing the line. White broke free and jumped down into the adjacent tunnel. The station master, Mr Wilton heard the commotion and arrived on the platform, but fell onto the track. As he lay there he witnessed Charles White being hit by a train. Although Charles White was not killed by the impact, he died in the ambulance on its way to Queen's Hospital, Birmingham.

Preceding station	Historical railways	Following station
Granville Street; Line closed, station closed	Midland Railway; Birmingham West Suburban Railway	Somerset Road; Line open, station closed
