= Alrewas railway station =

Disused railway station in Alrewas, Lichfield

Alrewas
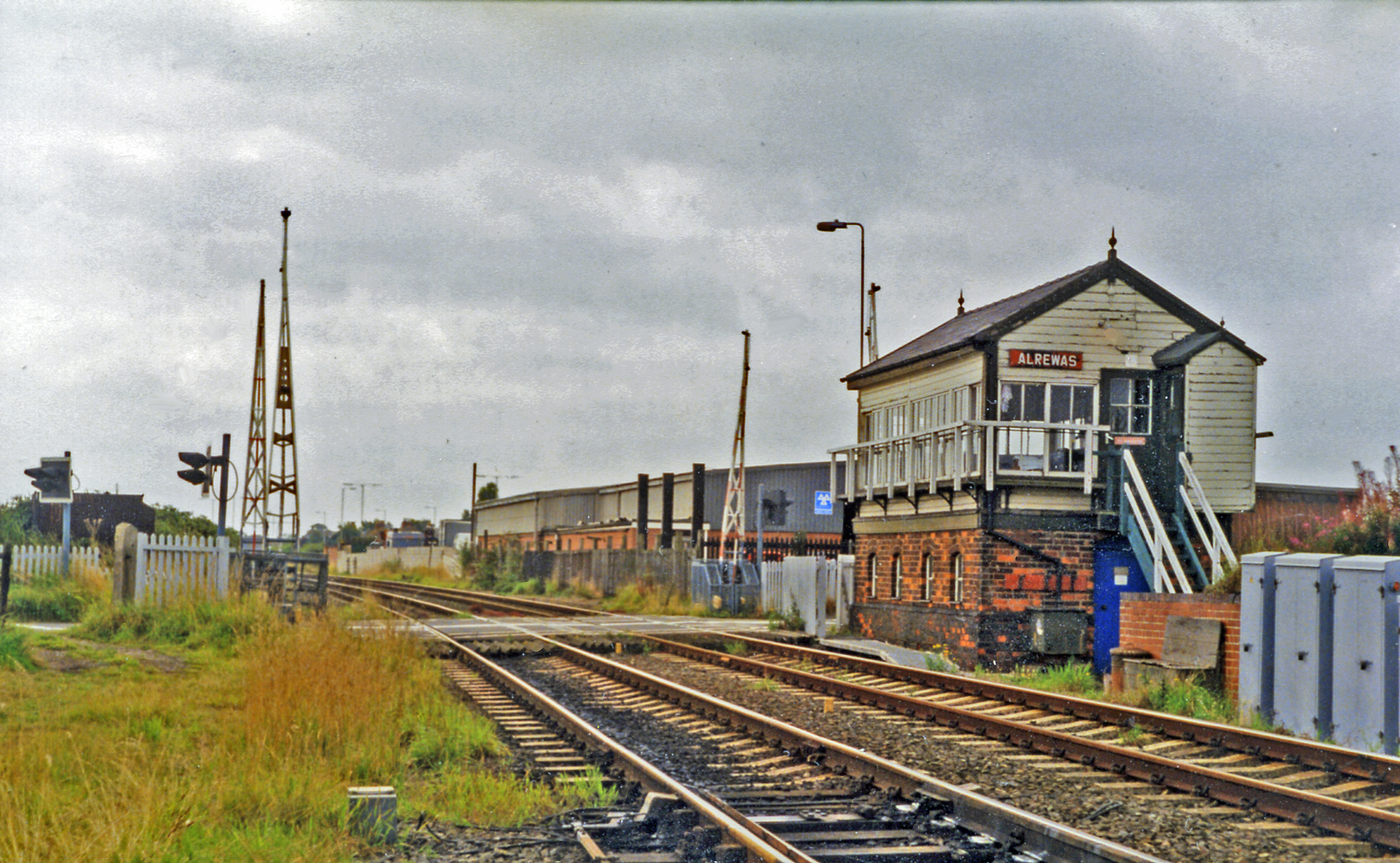
- The station's location (1993)

General information
- Location: Alrewas, Lichfield; England
- Coordinates: 52.7304°N 1.7394°W
- Grid reference: SK176147
- Platforms: 2

Other information
- Status: Disused

History
- Original company: South Staffordshire Railway
- Pre-grouping: London and North Western Railway
- Post-grouping: London Midland and Scottish Railway

Key dates
- 9 April 1849: Opened
- 18 January 1965: Closed
Location

Alrewas railway station was a station on the South Staffordshire Railway, which served the village of Alrewas, Staffordshire. The station was located next to a level crossing, although the main road, now the A513, now crosses the railway line via a bridge.

== History ==
The station was opened by the South Staffordshire Railway, which joined the London and North Western Railway and was absorbed by the London Midland and Scottish Railway during the Grouping of 1923. The station passed on to the London Midland Region of British Railways on nationalisation in 1948.

The station closed by the British Railways Board in January 1965 as part of the Beeching cuts.

== The site today ==
The line through the station, which runs from Lichfield on the high-level line and is connected to the Southbound West Coast Main Line by a single track chord, runs past the station site to Wychnor Junction, near Burton upon Trent. Primarily a freight route, the line is also used by Avanti West Coast and CrossCountry to move trains from Birmingham New Street to Central Rivers TMD and by a very limited number of timetabled long-distance passenger trains. The route is additionally sometimes used as a means of diverting trains when engineering takes place between Birmingham New Street and Tamworth.

The station retains its signal box, which supervises the adjacent level crossing and the partly single track section to Wychnor Junction. It also acts as a signalling "fringe" box to the East Midlands Rail Operating Centre at Derby.

=== Reopening proposals ===
In August 2017, calls to reopen the station followed the West Midlands Franchise award. As part of the new franchise, West Midlands Trains has committed to looking at opening new stations. Calls to reopen the station have been mentioned. In a document by Transport for West Midlands it was proposed that the station could potentially reopen to passengers in the future. In October 2018, as part of a 30-year strategy of Transport in the West Midlands, it was proposed that by 2034 Alrewas could reopen to passengers as part of plans to extend the Cross-City line services from Lichfield Trent Valley to Burton-on-Trent twice an hour, as well as the reintroducing services to Walsall via the mothballed South Staffordshire Line.

Calls to reopen the station were renewed in 2020 with access to the nearby National Memorial Arboretum, which opened after the original station was closed. There are also plans for homebuilding on the present site of a quarry which could see the station reopened.

| Preceding station | Historical railways | Following station |
|---|---|---|
| Wichnor Junction; Line open, station closed | London and North Western Railway; South Staffordshire Line | Lichfield Trent Valley; Line and station open |
