= Central Rivers TMD =

Railway maintenance depot in the UK

- Interactive map of Central Rivers TMD

Location
- Location: Barton-under-Needwood, Staffordshire, England
- Coordinates: 52.7550°N 1.7045°W
- OS grid: SK199175

Characteristics
- Owner: Alstom
- Depot code: CZ
- Type: DEMU

History
- Opened: 2001
- Original: Bombardier

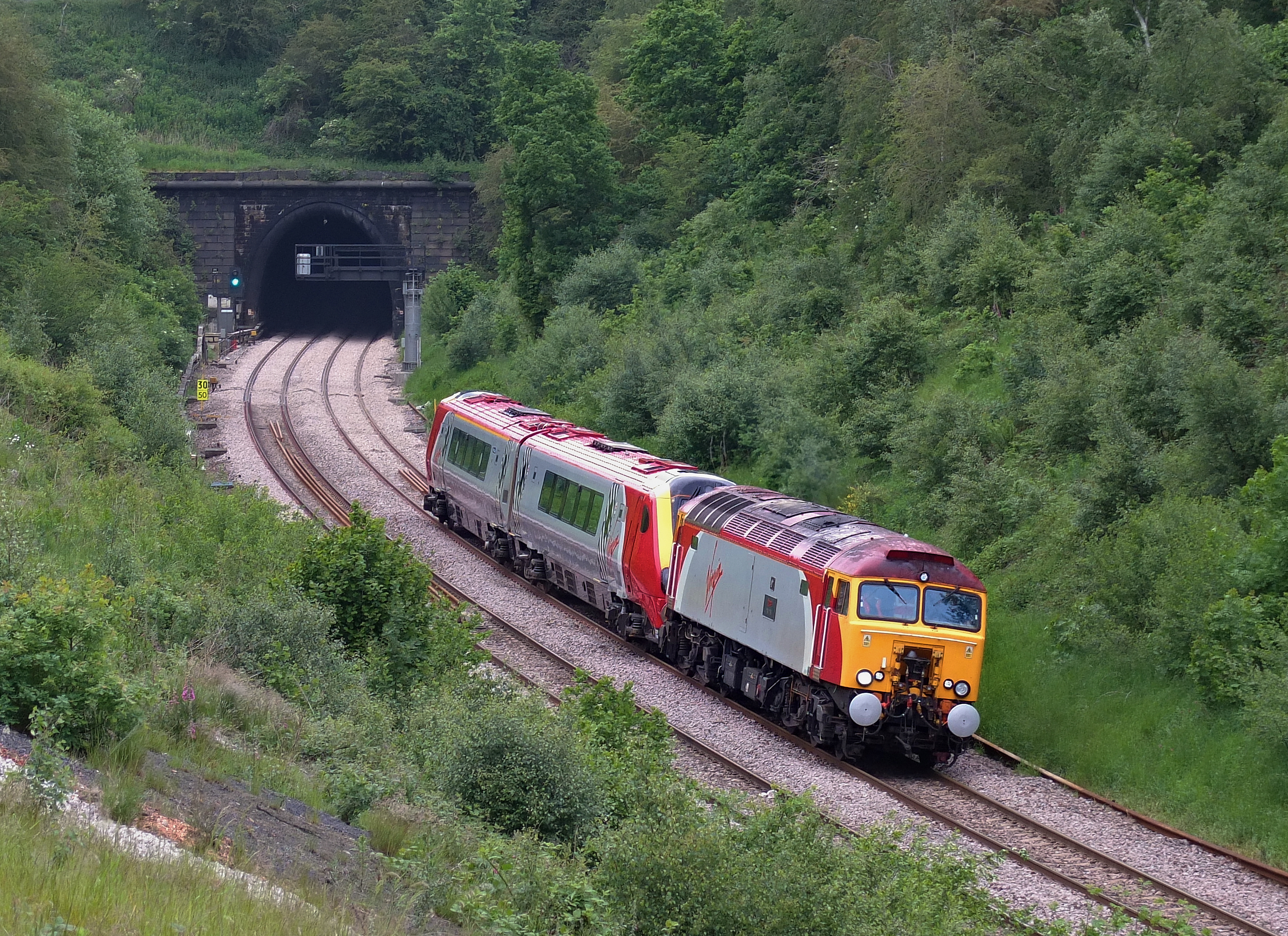
Class 57 number 57 308 "TinTin" passes Claycross working the 5Z33 York NRM - Barton under Needwood (Central Rivers) service, hauling a pair of class 221 vehicles

Central Rivers TMD (also known as Barton-under-Needwood CMD) is a railway maintenance depot, located in Barton-under-Needwood, 4 miles (6 km) south-west of Burton on Trent, England. It was built by Bombardier Transportation as the central maintenance facility for the Class 220 and 221 Voyagers then being delivered to Virgin CrossCountry. It came into operation on 8 September 2001. The nearest railway station is Burton on Trent.

This site was chosen due to being close to Virgin Cross Country's Birmingham hub as well as being relatively close to Derby and Crewe. The depot's facilities include inspection and working pits, hoisting facilities, train washing and refueling is designed for a planned turnaround of up to 20 serviced trains per night.

The Virgin CrossCountry franchise finished in November 2007, however Central Rivers continues to maintain the Voyagers for its successor CrossCountry as well as for Grand Central.

== Lichfield Trent Valley spur ==
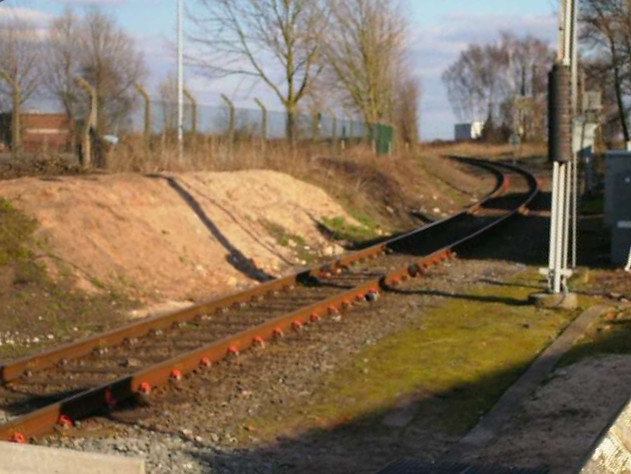
Lichfield Trent Valley spur

A single line spur from the West Coast Main Line, near Lichfield Trent Valley, to the old South Staffordshire Line allows units to reach Central Rivers from that line.
