= Saltley TMD =

Disused railway locomotive depot in the West Midlands, England

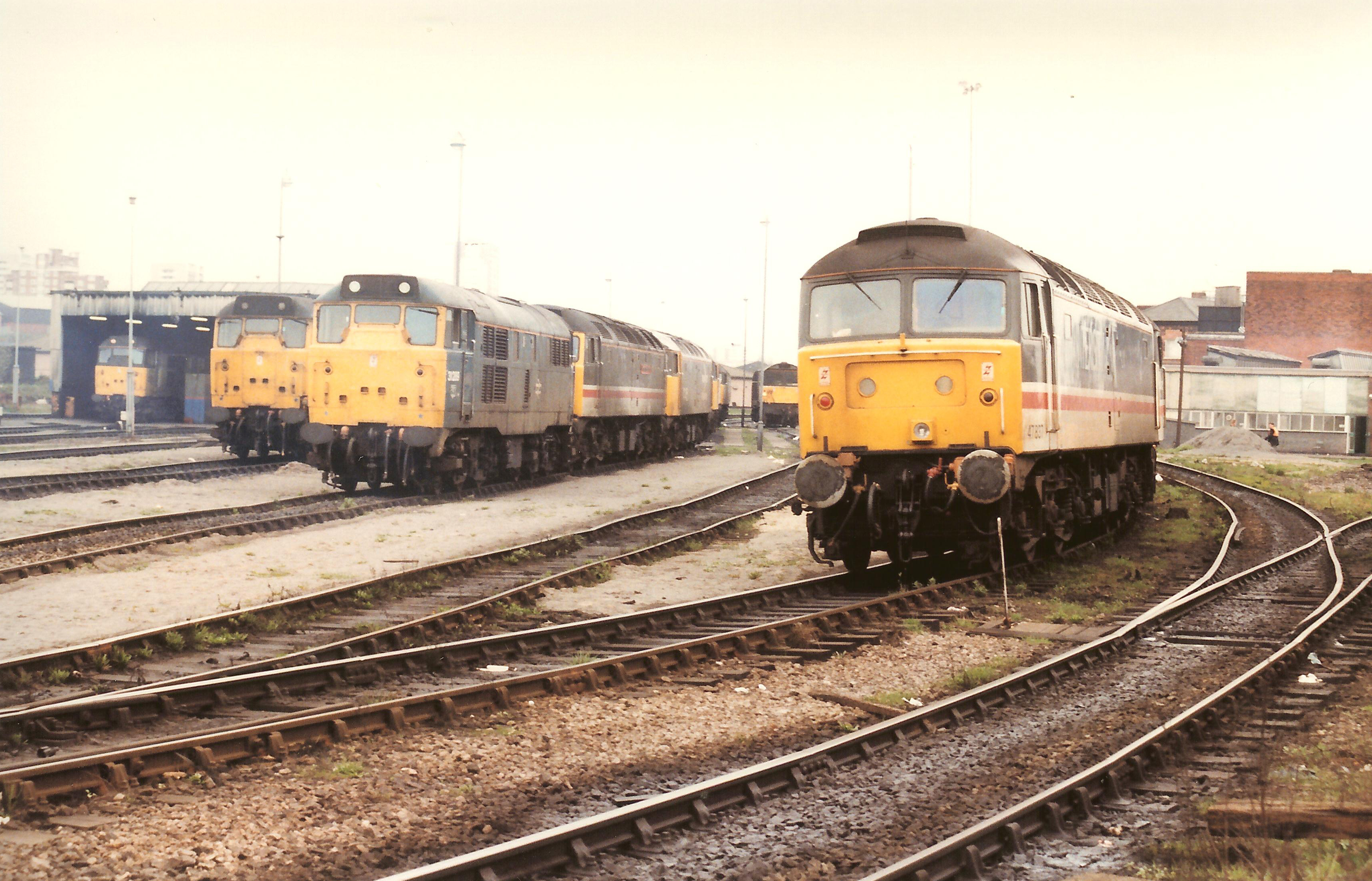
- Class 31 and Class 47 locomotives at Saltley Depot in 1991
- Interactive map of Saltley TMD

Location
- Location: Saltley, Birmingham
- Coordinates: 52.4862°N 1.8655°W
- OS grid: SP092875

Characteristics
- Owner: British Rail
- Depot code: SY (1973 - 2005)
- Type: Diesel

History
- Opened: 1868
- Closed: 2005
- Former depot code: 21A (1948 - 31 August 1963); 2E (1 September 1963 - 5 May 1973)

Saltley TMD was a traction maintenance depot located in Saltley, Birmingham, England. The depot was situated on the east side of the line between Birmingham New Street and Water Orton, and was near Saltley station until the station closed in 1968.

The depot code was SY.

== History ==
The steam loco shed closed to steam on 6 March 1967, but a locomotive inspection point was built along with a few offices.

== Present ==
The offices are still open and are a signing on point for DB Schenker drivers but the depot is derelict and there are no trains present.
