= Central Goods railway station =

Defunct railway goods depot in Birmingham, England

Central Goods
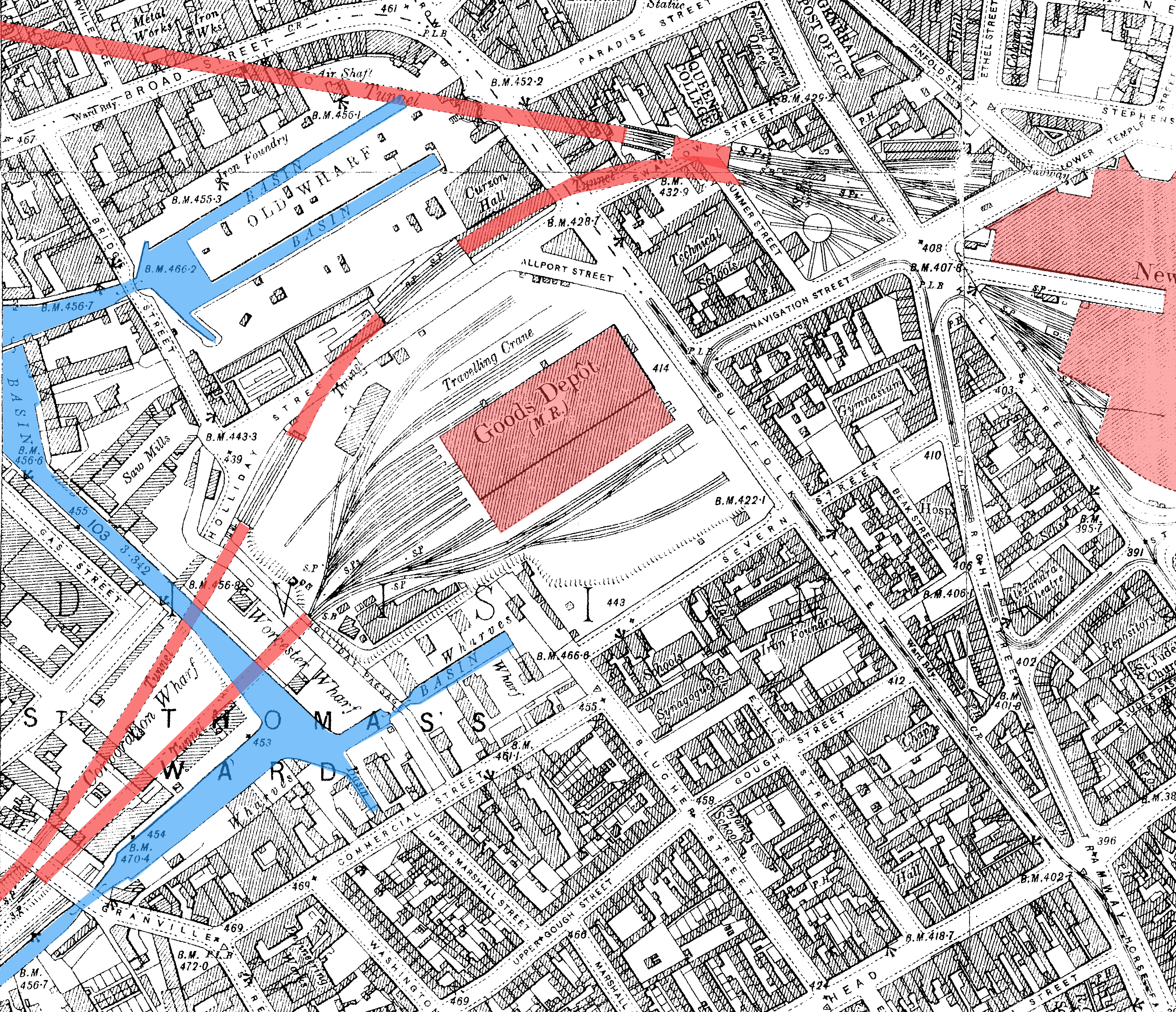
- 1905 map of Birmingham with tunnels and Central Goods Depot in relation to New Street Station.

General information
- Location: Birmingham City Centre, Birmingham; England
- Coordinates: 52.4769°N 1.9050°W
- Grid reference: SP065865

Other information
- Status: Disused

History
- Pre-grouping: Midland Railway
- Post-grouping: London, Midland and Scottish Railway

Key dates
- 1 July 1887: Opened as Worcester Wharf
- 31 May 1892: Name changed to Central Goods
- 6 March 1967: Closed
Location

Central Goods railway station was a goods-only railway station in central Birmingham, England, on a spur connected to the Birmingham West Suburban Railway, which ran via a tunnel under the Worcester and Birmingham Canal which it was adjacent to. The station was opened by the Midland Railway on 1 July 1887. It was originally known as Worcester Wharf due to it being located next to the canal, its proximity to which allowed for transshipment with canal barges, the name was changed on 31 May 1892. It initially had facilities to handle 375 wagons, but was expanded gradually over the next fifteen years. It was located in approximately the intended location for the terminal station of the Birmingham West Suburban Railway but which was unable to raise the funds for the planned viaduct over the canal.

In 1923 the depot was taken over by the newly amalgamated London, Midland and Scottish Railway, and in 1948 by the nationalised British Railways (later British Rail).

From the 1940s onwards, competition from road transport led to a decline in the use of rail freight. In its later years, the depot mostly handled parcels traffic. It eventually closed on 6 March 1967. The spur line leading to it was permanently closed two years later.

The site was later occupied by a Royal Mail sorting office, and is now partly occupied by The Mailbox shopping centre and office development.
