= University railway station (England) =

Railway station in Birmingham, England

University
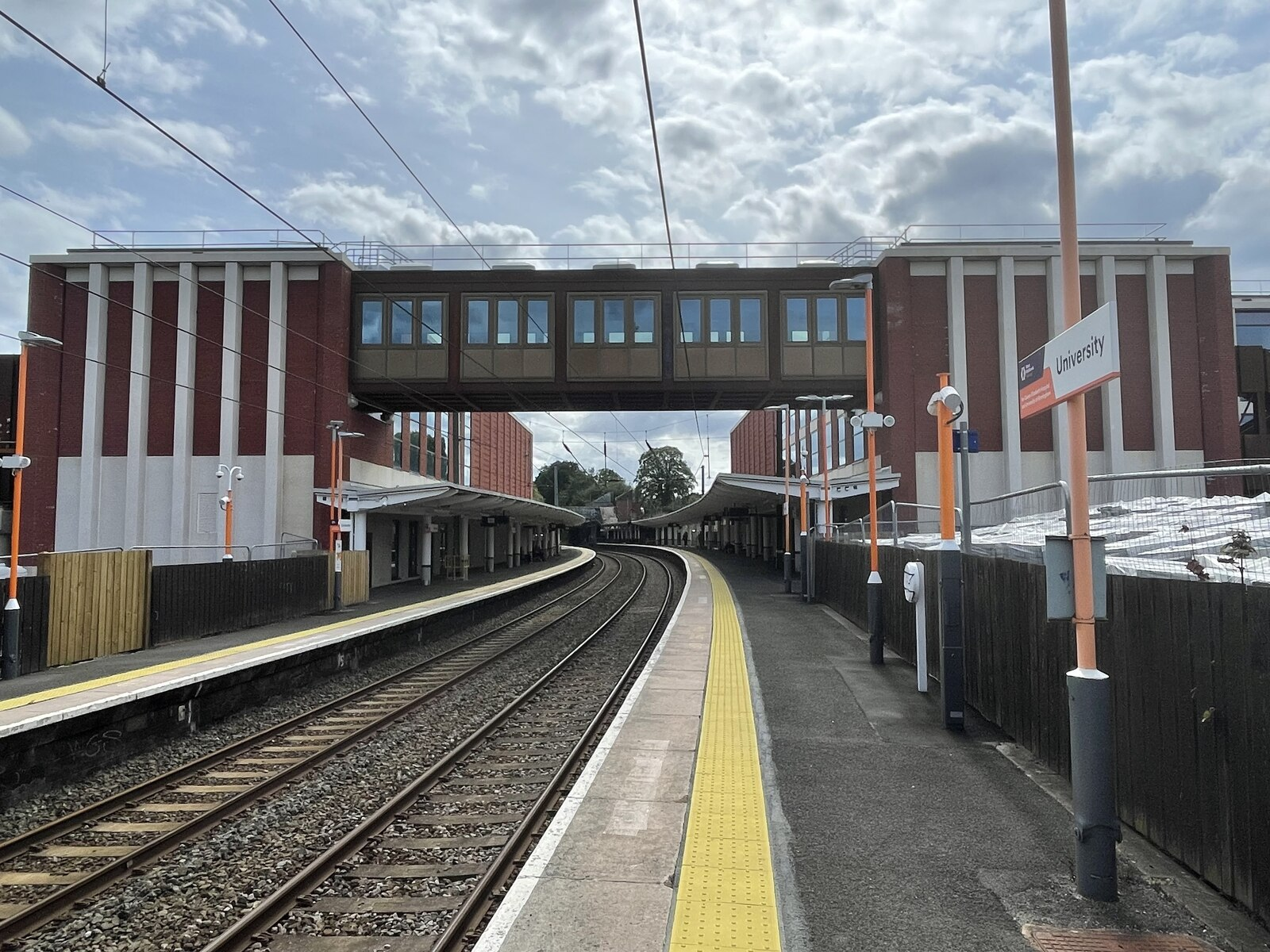
- View of redeveloped station in 2023.

General information
- Location: Edgbaston, Birmingham; England
- Coordinates: 52.451°N 1.936°W
- Grid reference: SP043837
- Manager: West Midlands Railway
- Transit authority: Transport for West Midlands
- Platforms: 2

Construction
- Architect: John Broome (original) 1978 and Associated Architects (rebuild) 2024

Other information
- Station code: UNI
- Fare zone: 2
- Classification: DfT category D

History
- Original company: British Rail

Key dates
- 1978: Opened
- 2024: Rebuilt

Passengers
- 2021/22: ▲1.961 million
- 2022/23: ▲2.633 million
- 2023/24: ▲3.051 million
- 2024/25: ▲3.756 million
- 2025/26: ▲3.866 million
Location
Notes
- Passenger statistics from the Office of Rail and Road

University railway station serves the University of Birmingham, Birmingham Women's Hospital, and the Queen Elizabeth Hospital in south west Birmingham England. It is on the Cross-City Line, which runs from Redditch and Bromsgrove to Lichfield Trent Valley via Birmingham New Street. Most services are operated by West Midlands Railway who also manage the station, and some are operated by CrossCountry.

The station is the only main line railway station in Great Britain built specifically to serve a university.

== History ==
=== Construction ===
Located on the former Birmingham West Suburban Railway, University station was built in 1977–8 to the designs of the architect John Broome as part of the upgrade of the Cross City line. The station was opened by William Rodgers, the Secretary of State for Transport, on 8 May 1978. It is a short distance away from the former Somerset Road station, which closed in the 1930s. The station is partly built on the site of the ancient Metchley Roman Fort. The Cross-City Line was electrified in 1993, and Class 323 electric multiple units were introduced by British Rail on local services. Class 730 trains were introduced in January 2025.

In 2017, it was announced that the station would receive up to £10 million as an improvement fund to enhance passenger experience and reduce overcrowding, as part of the Government's Midlands Engine Strategy.

=== Redevelopment ===
In July 2019, West Midlands Rail Executive (WMRE) and Transport for West Midlands (TfWM) announced plans to redevelop the station in order to accommodate increasing passenger numbers generally and those arising from the 2022 Commonwealth Games, of which two events were held at venues on the University of Birmingham campus. The upgrades are intended to allow the station, originally designed for approximately 500,000 passengers a year, to handle more than 7 million passengers annually. It is one of the busiest railway stations in the West Midlands region; as of 26 January 2024, 3.5 million people use the station annually.

The plans included:

- construction of a new, larger station building at the north end of the platforms
- widening of the platforms to alleviate crowding during peak times
- a footbridge over the canal linking the new station to the university campus
- a new public space around the approach to the new building

On 22 July 2020, Minister of State for Transport Chris Heaton-Harris announced £12 million of government funding towards the expected £56 million cost of the project. The remaining £44 million was to be funded by a consortium comprising the University of Birmingham, Birmingham City Council, Network Rail, West Midlands Trains, and the Greater Birmingham and Solihull LEP.

Construction work took place from 2021 to 2024. The architects were Associated Architects and the contractor was VolkerFitzpatrick. The extended platforms were opened in time for the Birmingham 2022 Commonwealth Games in July 2022, and the new buildings were opened on 28 January 2024. Numerous other facilities within the station were improved, replaced, or expanded. The widths of the platforms were doubled and equipped with a canopy for sun and rain protection, and the landscaping was improved.

== Facilities ==
Pedestrian access is via University Road West, close to the Medical School and bus interchange - 234 metres (256 yd) uphill from University Centre. Owing to the station's campus location on a service road, there is no car parking, although nearby Selly Oak station is a designated Park and Ride station. The station sits alongside the Worcester and Birmingham Canal, a popular route for cyclists and joggers. Access is at street level as there is a fence between Platform 2 and the towpath.

On the concourse are two automated ticket machines and two windowed ticket booths, staffed Monday to Friday 07:00–20:00, Saturday 08:00–19:00, and Sunday 10:00–16:00. There is lift access down to both platforms from the entrance. After crossing the river via the elevated walkway from the south-east passage, stairs and a Z-shaped ramp connect to the campus. Platform 2 has a covered waiting room. Fare control is enforced by a line of automatic ticket barriers installed at the passage to both platforms, there is a kiosk within the fare gates on each platform at this station to provide fare adjustment services for passengers.

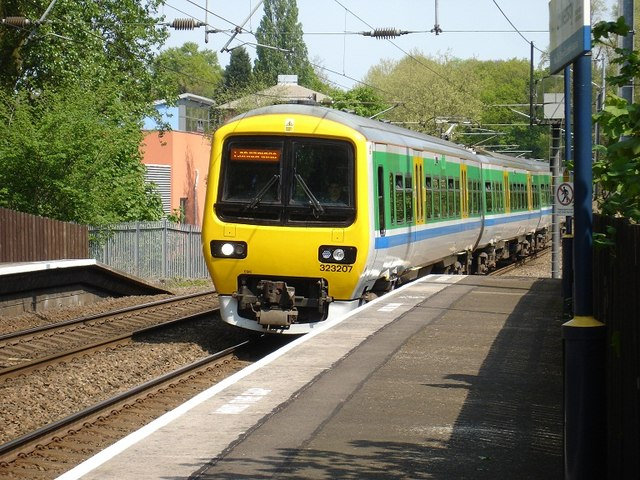
A Centro livery Class 323 arriving at the station in 2007

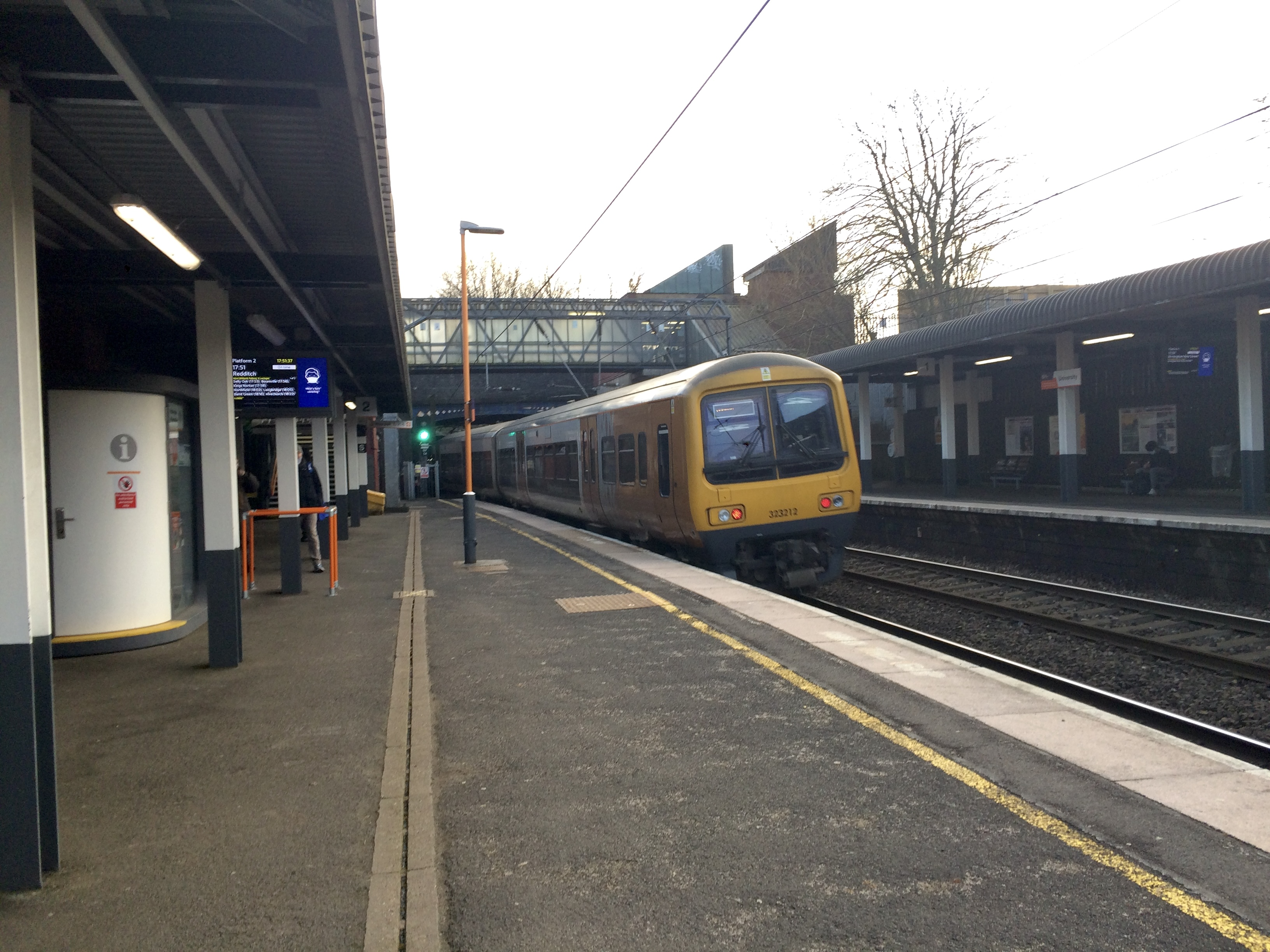
A West Midlands Railway Class 323 to Redditch departs University in 2021

== Services ==
The station is served by West Midlands Trains with local Transport for West Midlands branded "Cross-City" services, operated using Class 730 EMUs.

West Midlands Railway's longer-distance services to Hereford are operated using Class 196 diesel multiple units (DMUs) and CrossCountry services to Cardiff and Nottingham are operated by Class 170 DMUs.

University station is the sixth busiest station in the Transport for West Midlands region in terms of passenger numbers, and the busiest without a direct link to London. In both 2018–19 and 2019–20, passenger journeys to and from the station were just under four million.

The station is a penalty fare station for West Midlands Railway passengers without valid tickets, but not for CrossCountry passengers.

The typical off-peak weekday service, in trains per hour (tph) is:

=== Platform 1 (Northbound) ===
All services from Platform 1 stop at Birmingham New Street with an average journey time of around 7 minutes.

Weekday services from this platform include:

West Midlands Railway:

- 5 trains per hour (tph) run northbound to Birmingham New Street
  - Of which:
    - 2 tph continue to Four Oaks via Sutton Coldfield
    - 2 tph continue to Lichfield Trent Valley via Four Oaks
    - 1 tph runs to Birmingham New Street only.

CrossCountry:

- 1 train per hour to Nottingham via Derby.

=== Platform 2 (Southbound) ===
Weekday services from this platform include:

West Midlands Railway:

- 4 trains per hour run to Longbridge
  - Of which:
    - 2 tph continue to Bromsgrove
    - 2 tph continue to Redditch
- 1 train per hour runs to Hereford via Bromsgrove

CrossCountry:

- 1 train per hour to Cardiff Central

Preceding station	National Rail	Following station
Five Ways	West Midlands Railway; Lichfield Trent Valley – Four Oaks – Birmingham – Bromsgrove/Redditch; Cross-City Line	Selly Oak
Birmingham New Street	West Midlands Railway; Birmingham – Bromsgrove – Worcester – Hereford	Bromsgrove or Droitwich Spa or Barnt Green
Birmingham New Street	CrossCountry Cardiff – Nottingham	Worcestershire Parkway

== Disabled access ==
There is level access from the street to the ticket office and footbridge. Lifts provide access to both platforms from the footbridge. The station has a wide ticket gate which wheelchair users can use unaided.

This station has an hearing-aid induction loop installed to aid persons with hearing impairments. In regard to ticket procurement, a ticket vending machine has been installed within the Booking Hall, and in addition, staff can assist at the accessible booking office counter.

This station is rated Category A, with full step-free access to both platforms. Ramps are installed to assist access to trains. The meeting point for persons with impairments is the ticket office during staffed hours; otherwise, they should go to the departure platform and seek assistance from on-board staff once the train arrives.

National Key (RADAR) toilets are available in the Booking Hall. Passengers with a RADAR key can access them at any time. Passengers without a key may request one from station staff and can use the toilets during Booking Office opening hours.

While step-free access is comprehensive, an impaired mobility set-down area is not available. There are no wheelchairs available for loan. Accessible taxis and accessible public telephones are not available.
