= Lichfield Trent Valley railway station =

Railway station in Staffordshire, England

Lichfield Trent Valley
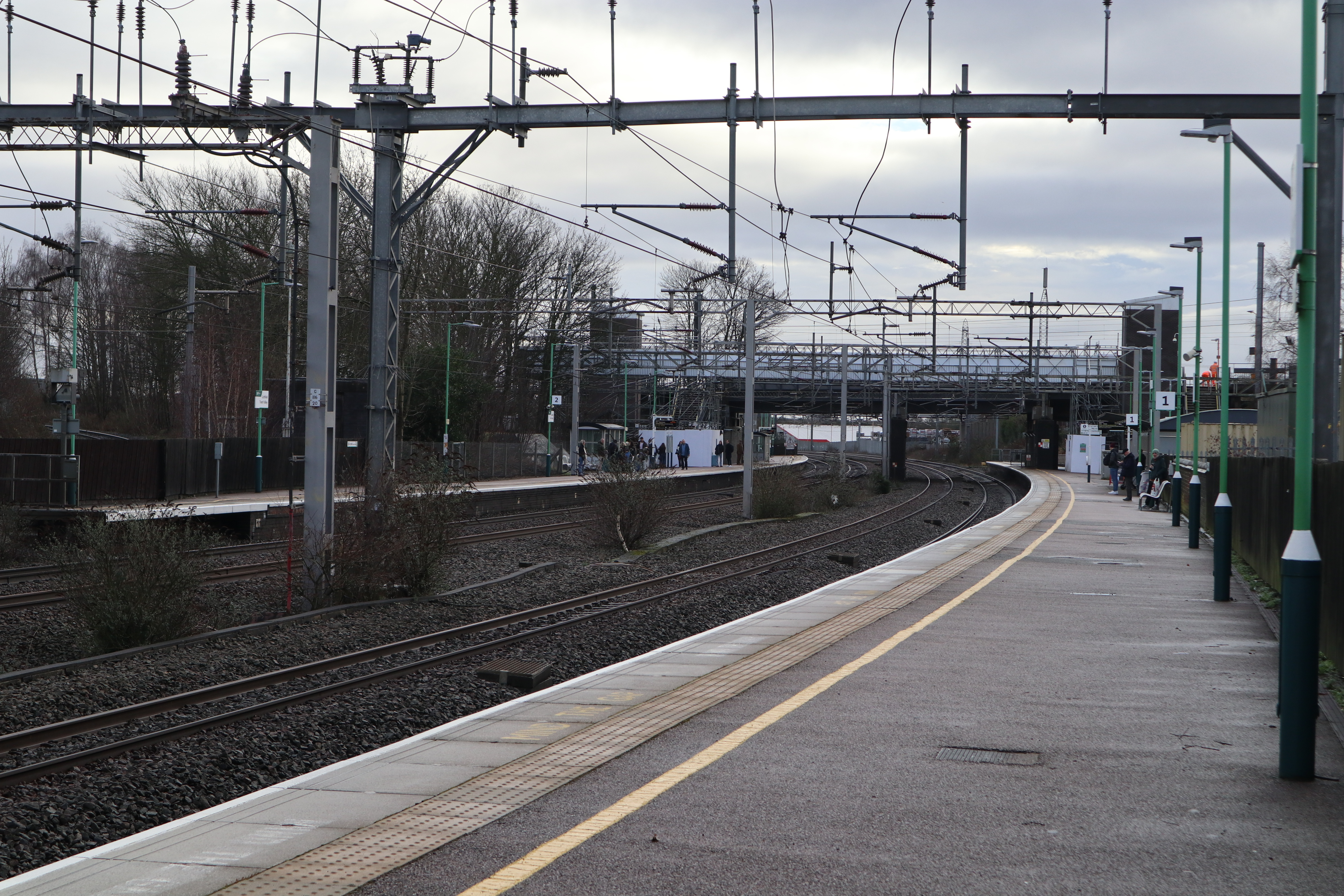
- Southward view of the low-level platforms in 2024; the high level platform is on the bridge over the main line

General information
- Location: Lichfield, District of Lichfield; England
- Coordinates: 52.68662°N 1.80024°W
- Grid reference: SK136099
- Manager: West Midlands Trains
- Platforms: 3
- Tracks: 6

Other information
- Station code: LTV
- Classification: DfT category E

History
- Opened: 1847
- Original company: Trent Valley Railway; South Staffordshire Railway
- Pre-grouping: London and North Western Railway
- Post-grouping: London, Midland and Scottish Railway

Key dates
- 15 September 1847: Original station on Trent Valley Railway opened as Lichfield
- August 1849: Station on South Staffs Railway opened as Lichfield Trent Valley Junction
- 3 July 1871: Earlier stations closed; present Lichfield Trent Valley station opened
- 18 January 1965: High level platforms closed
- 28 November 1988: High level platform reopened
- 1 June 2014: Station buildings replaced

Passengers
- 2021/22: ▲0.595 million
- Interchange: ▲68,711
- 2022/23: ▲0.688 million
- Interchange: ▼65,725
- 2023/24: ▲0.727 million
- Interchange: ▲69,864
- 2024/25: ▲0.888 million
- Interchange: ▲83,390
- 2025/26: ▲0.976 million
- Interchange: ▲129,387
Location
Notes
- Passenger statistics from the Office of Rail and Road

Lichfield Trent Valley is one of two railway stations that serve the city of Lichfield in Staffordshire, England; the other being Lichfield City in the city centre. It is a split-level station: low level platforms serve the Trent Valley section of the West Coast Main Line, with a single high level platform being the northern terminus of the Cross-City Line.

== History ==
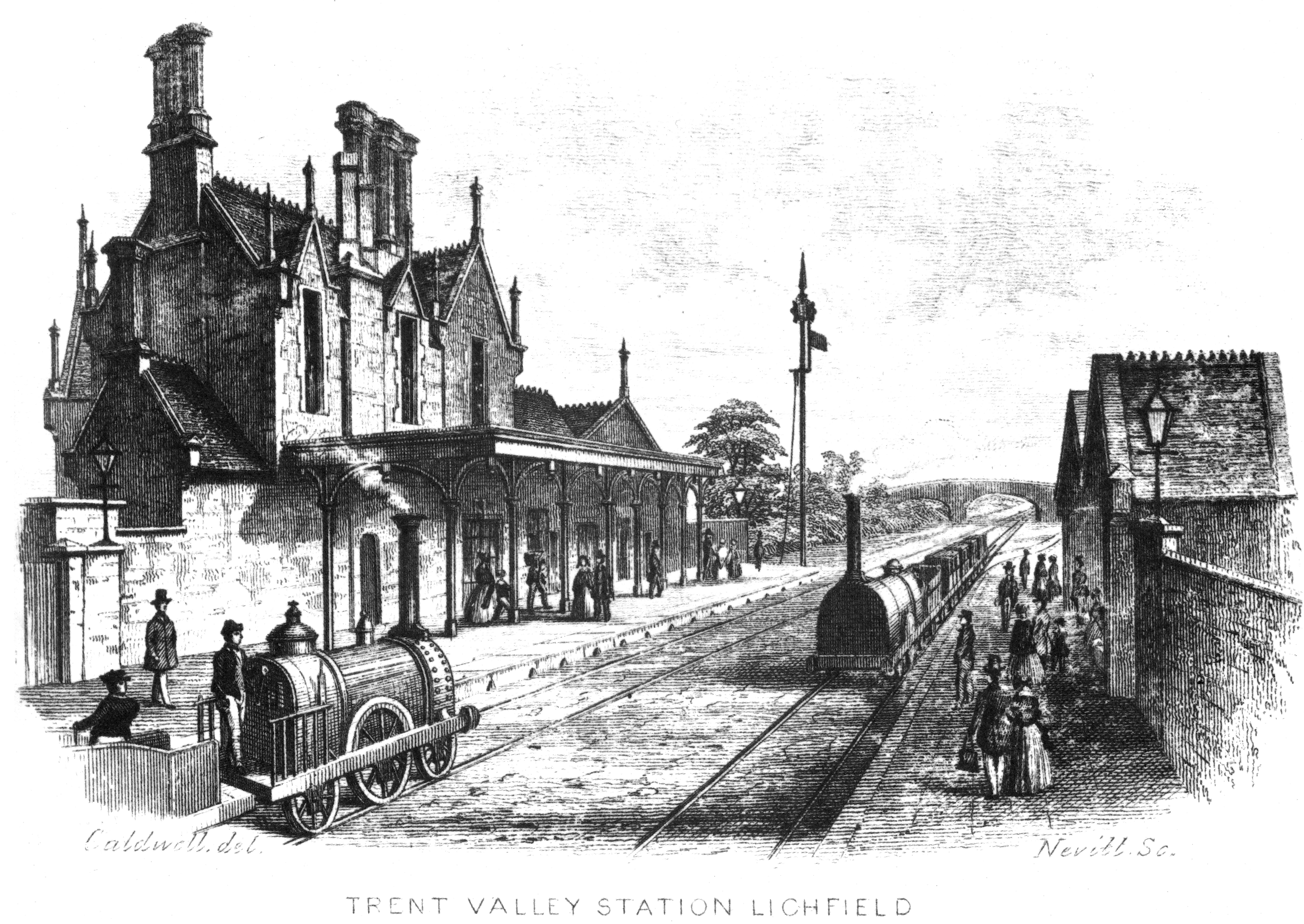
The first station, built in 1847

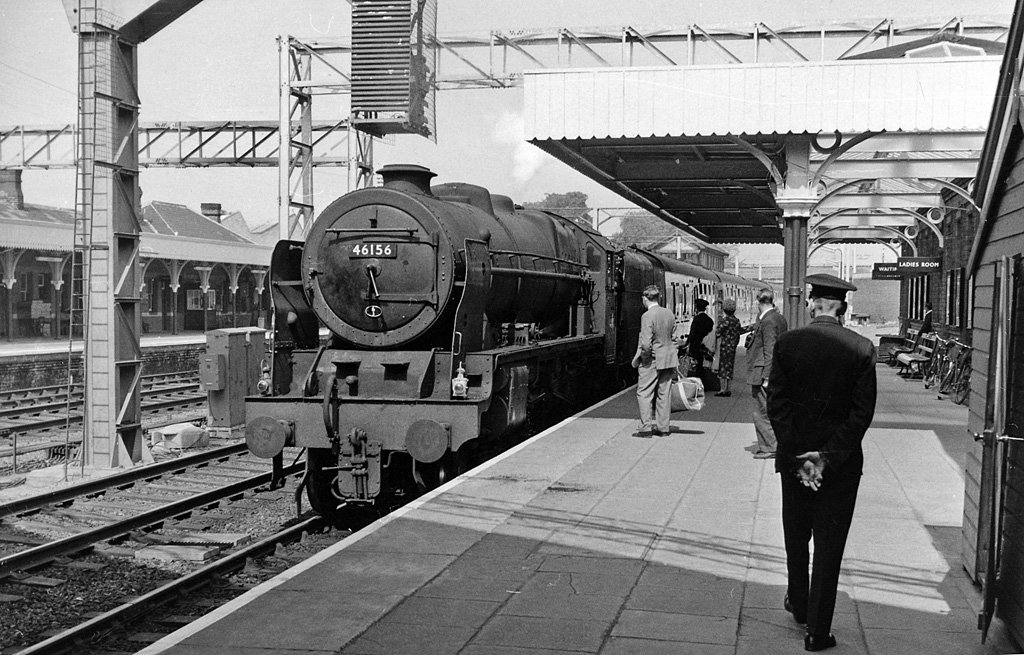
Lichfield Trent Valley (Low Level) in 1962

The Trent Valley Railway (TVR), which connected the London and Birmingham Railway (L&BR) at Rugby with the Grand Junction Railway (GJR) at Stafford, was formed on 21 July 1845, and opened on 15 September 1847, including a station at Lichfield. In the meantime, the L&BR, GJR and Manchester and Birmingham Railway had amalgamated in July 1846 as the London and North Western Railway (LNWR), which itself absorbed the TVR later in 1846. This first station at Lichfield was built in 1847. This station was situated north of Burton Road approximately 0.2 miles north of the current crossing point. The architect, John William Livock, built the station in a Tudor Gothic style.

The South Staffordshire Railway (SSR), which connected Dudley with Burton-on-Trent, was formed on 6 October 1846 by amalgamation of two smaller railways, both of which had been formed on 3 August 1846. The line north of Walsall opened on 9 April 1849, but the station named Lichfield Trent Valley Junction was not opened until August 1849. Lichfield Trent Valley Junction was built south of Burton Road close to Streethay, just past the present signal box. From it, a spur line descended to the other station north of the crossing point to allow passengers to transfer to the LNWR main line below. The SSR was leased to the LNWR in February 1861 and was absorbed by that company on 15 July 1867.

On 3 July 1871, both of these stations were closed by the LNWR, they were replaced with a single station; Lichfield Trent Valley was built in its present location with high and low-level platforms adjoining each other. The low-level platforms, serving the Rugby-Stafford line, were situated approximately 400 m (440 yd) south of the original TVR station. The high-level platforms closed on 18 January 1965, with the withdrawal of passenger services between Lichfield City and Burton-on-Trent.

On 28 November 1988, the service between Birmingham New Street and Lichfield City was extended; initially both of the high-level platforms at Lichfield Trent Valley were reopened as a terminus, with steps leading up to both sides from the low level platforms. At that time, the service was hourly and the diesel multiple units were shunted as empty coaching stock north from the down Walsall platform to just past the high level signalbox. There they would be crossed over to the up Walsall line and proceed into the up platform. These workings remained in place until the now current trailing crossover, just south of the high level platform, was opened during the electrification and upgrading of the line in 1992. Once the new trailing crossing had been commissioned, the up Walsall platform was closed and the electric trains terminated at the down Walsall platform without requiring a shunt move to reverse.

The signal box was demolished over the weekend of 15 June 2008 as part of the West Coast upgrade.

In December 2013, work started on an upgrade to the station; this included the opening of an additional car park in February 2014 and the construction of a new station building.

From July to December 2023, platform 3 on the Cross-City Line was replaced by a new structure due to corrosion of the old platform supports. Whilst the bridge was being replaced, a temporary footbridge was in use and a rail replacement bus transported passengers between Lichfield City and Trent Valley stations.

=== 1946 accident ===
On New Year's Day 1946, the station was the site of a points failure resulting in an express fish train from Fleetwood to London Broad Street being diverted into a stationary local passenger train standing in the up platform loop. This resulted in the deaths of 20 people and 21 injuries. The disaster is one of the very rare cases in the UK that involved a mechanical point interlocking failing to prevent an accident.

== Location ==
The station is located 1 mile (2 km) mile north-east from the city-centre, serving the east and north side of the city. It is also used by commuters from surrounding villages, such as Fradley, Alrewas and Whittington. The station bears the name Trent Valley, as the line on the lower level was opened by the Trent Valley Railway, which ran between Rugby and Stafford.

The River Trent is found around 6 miles north of Lichfield Trent Valley at Wynchnor Junction, where it is joined by two of its tributaries, the River Tame and the River Mease.

Access to the station is from the A5127. The station serves as a connecting station for travellers wishing to get to Birmingham on the Cross-City Line.

== Features ==
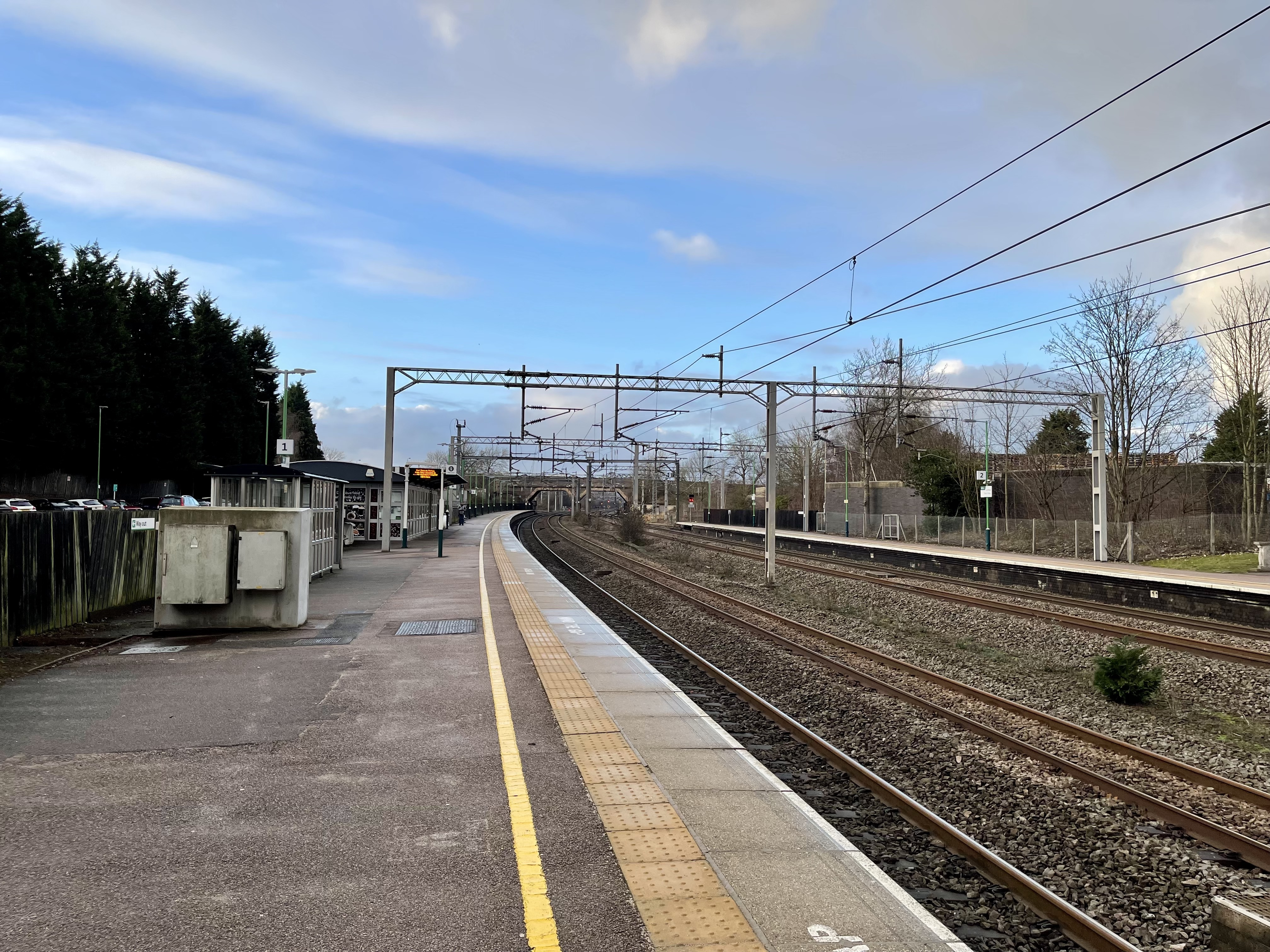
Lichfield Trent Valley station, January 2021

The station's low-level platforms are located on the Trent Valley Line section of the West Coast Main Line (WCML). Facilities are basic; the original station buildings on the low-level platforms were demolished in 1969 and replaced with a basic wooden building and shelter.

Above this, a single platform at a right-angle to the low-level platforms, forms the high-level part of the station. This is Platform 3 and is used as the northern terminus of the Cross-City Line, which passes over the WCML on a bridge. The high-level platform is connected by stairs from the low-level platforms and also serves as a footbridge for passenger access to the southbound low-level platform. Passenger lifts were installed here in June 2020 to allow for step free access between the lower and upper platforms. Platform 3 was replaced from 2022 to 2023.

In 2022, it was temporarily closed due to safety concerns while repairs took place. The platform then closed from July to December 2023 to allow it to be replaced in a £5.8 million project.

North of the high-level station, the line continues to Wychnor Junction, where it joins the Cross Country Route towards Derby. This stretch of line remains open for freight trains, empty stock transfers to the nearby Central Rivers TMD and occasional diversions, but no longer has a regular advertised passenger service. One or two trains a day between Birmingham and Derby use this route without stopping instead of going via Tamworth for operational reasons. Passenger services used to run north to Alrewas and Burton-on-Trent, but these ceased when the high-level station was closed in 1965.

One platform of the high-level station was reopened as the northern terminus of the Cross City Line in 1988 by British Rail. Southbound services run to Bromsgrove, via Birmingham New Street and Longbridge. A single track chord connects the low and high level lines at the north of the station, but is not regularly used.

== Services ==
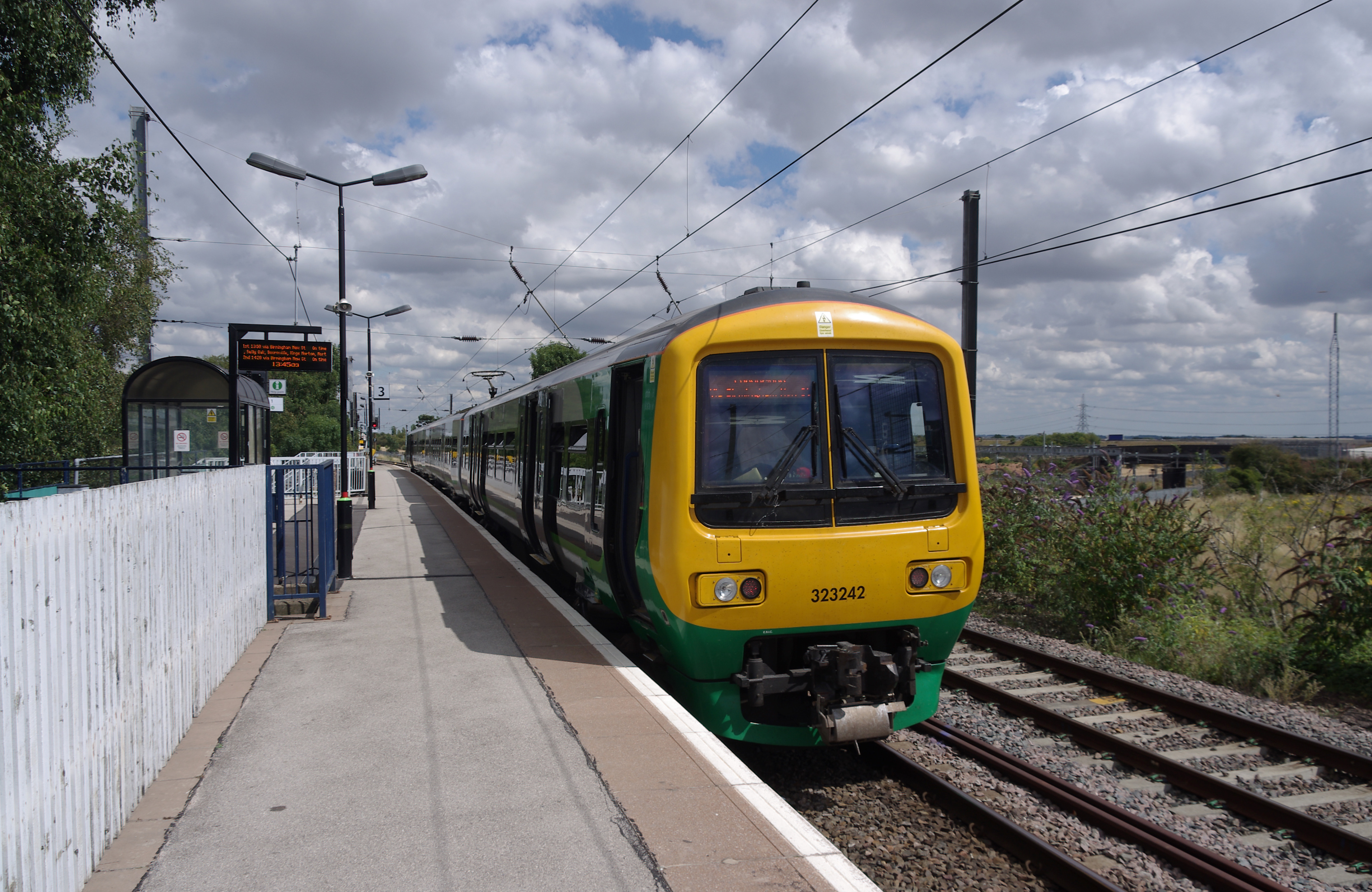
The high-level Cross-City Line terminus platform

The station is served by two train operating companies, with the following typical weekday services:

=== Avanti West Coast ===
- 1 train per hour (tph) to London Euston, via Tamworth
- 1 tph to Liverpool Lime Street, via Runcorn

=== West Midlands Trains ===
Operating under the London Northwestern Railway branding, there are hourly semi-fast services in each direction between London Euston and Crewe, via Nuneaton, Rugby and Stafford. Some peak services call at Northampton.

Using the West Midlands Railway brand, on the high level platform 3, there is a half-hourly service on Mondays to Saturdays on the Cross-City Line to Bromsgrove. On Sundays, the service typically terminates at Redditch. The average journey time to Birmingham New Street is around 41 minutes.

Preceding station	National Rail	Following station
Terminus	West Midlands Railway; Lichfield – Birmingham – Bromsgrove/Redditch; Cross-City Line	Lichfield City
Rugeley Trent Valley towards Crewe	London Northwestern Railway London–Crewe	Tamworth towards London Euston
Stafford	Avanti West Coast Liverpool – London	Tamworth
Runcorn	Avanti West Coast Liverpool – London	Tamworth
Stafford	Avanti West Coast; Manchester – London	Tamworth or London Euston
Stoke-on-Trent	Avanti West Coast; Manchester – London	Tamworth or London Euston
Stafford	Avanti West Coast; North Wales – London	Tamworth
Stafford	Avanti West Coast; North West – London	Tamworth
Historical railways
Alrewas Line open, station closed	London and North Western Railway South Staffordshire Railway	Lichfield City Line and station open
