= World Branding Awards =

International award presented to global and national brands

- Awarded for: Excellence in branding
- Location: Kensington Palace, London; Hofburg Palace, Vienna; The Plaza, New York
- Presented by: World Branding Forum
- Hosted by: David Croft, Olivia Wayne, Moody McCarthy, Stuart Freeman
- Act: Ben Hanlin
- First award: 2014
- Winners: List of World Branding Awards winners

Highlights
- Most wins: Apple, British Airways, Barclays, Coca-Cola, HSBC, McDonald's, Visa
- Website: awards.brandingforum.org

The World Branding Awards is an international award presented to global and national brands for their work and achievements in branding. The World Branding Forum, based in London, organises the awards.

There are three tiers of awards. A Global Award is presented to international brands, a Regional Award is presented to brands that are the top in several countries in a particular geographic region, and a National Award is presented to brands from participating countries. The awards trophy is on display at the Museum of Brands, Packaging & Advertising in London. The award's Brand of the Year logo is a registered trademark.

The 2015, 2016, 2017, and 2018 award ceremonies took place at Kensington Palace in London.

In 2017, the first Animalis Edition, an award ceremony dedicated to pet and animal branding, was held in the Hofburg Palace in Vienna. It is the world's largest animal and pet branding awards ceremony. The second Animalis Edition was held at the same venue in 2019.

In 2018, the Americas Edition of the awards, dedicated to the Americas and the Caribbean, was held at The Plaza on Fifth Avenue in New York City.

== Nominations, judging, and scoring ==
Nominations for the awards can be made by brands' owners, custodians, agencies, or the public. There are three tiers of awards: a Global Award is presented to international brands that have a presence in ten or more countries, on three or more continents, limited to the top 100 global brands in any particular year; a Regional Award is presented to brands that are the top in several countries in a particular geographic region; and a National Award, which is presented to the top brands in participating countries at the awards. Brands that are global winners are not awarded again on a national level.

Winners of the awards are judged through three streams: brand valuation, consumer market research, and public online voting. There are also other awards for individuals voted for by the World Branding Forum Advisory Council. Winners go through an assessment process to determine the level of work put in by a brand for their branding activities. The level of trust that the brands' customers and the public have for the brand is also taken into account.

== Trophy ==
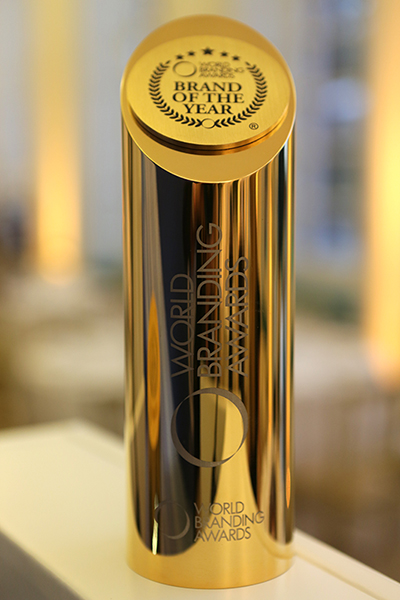
A gold plated World Branding Awards trophy on display at the Museum of Brands, Packaging & Advertising in London

The award trophies are made in Stratford-upon-Avon. The first trophies were manufactured in nickel and gold plate, and accented in acrylic with a design focus on the logo. In 2016, a new gold-plated trophy was introduced for all winners. This is a solid trophy with no acrylic, and highlights the logo. It is 245 mm (9.6 in) in height and 76 mm (3.0 in) in diameter with an angled top, and weighs 1.8 kg (4.0 lb).

A trophy is on display at the Museum of Brands, Packaging & Advertising in London.

== Award ceremonies ==
=== 2014–2015 Awards ===
Over 2,500 brands from 35 countries were nominated for the Awards for the 2014–2015 period. Of these, 119 brands were awarded.

==== London ceremony ====
The London Awards ceremony was held on 26 October 2014, at One Whitehall Place, the events building of the Royal Horseguards Hotel. David Croft hosted the event.

==== Paris ceremony ====
The Paris Awards ceremony took place on 25 March 2015, at the Hilton Paris Opéra. This second instalment of the 2014–2015 awards emphasised food, beverage, luxury, fashion, lifestyle, hospitality, and service brands, with 50 brands from 22 countries awarded.

French actress, Sara Verhagen, presented the awards, and magician, Ben Hanlin provided the entertainment.

=== 2015–2016 Awards ===
For the 2015–2016 period, more than 65,000 people voted for 2,600 nominated brands from 35 countries. 118 brands from 30 countries were declared winners. The awards ceremony took place on 24 September 2015 at Kensington Palace. Olivia Wayne of Sky Sports hosted the event.

=== 2016–2017 Awards ===
This edition of the awards saw over 120,000 people voting for more than 2,800 brands from 35 countries. 210 brands from 30 countries were declared winners. The ceremony was held in Kensington Palace. Among the attendees were the United Arab Emirates Ambassador to the United Kingdom, Sulaiman Almazroui, and the Philippines Ambassador, Evan Garcia. David Croft of Sky Sports hosted the event.

=== 2017–2018 Awards ===
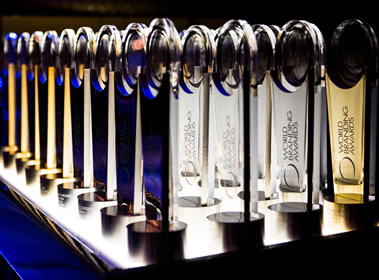
The original World Branding Awards trophies, before they were replaced with a new design in 2016

Over 135,000 people voted for more than 3,000 brands from 35 countries in 2017. 245 winners were awarded. The awards ceremony was held in Kensington Palace in London.

In the same year, the Animalis Edition of the awards, focused on pet and animal brands, saw 92 brands from 35 countries named "Brand of the Year" in a ceremony held at the Hofburg Palace in Vienna.

=== 2018–2019 Awards ===
In 2018, the World Branding Forum held two Brand of the Year Awards ceremonies.

The Americas Edition of the awards was held at The Plaza in New York City in July. 22 countries participated.

The Global Edition of the Brand of the Year Awards ceremony was then held at Kensington Palace in London, UK in October 2018. 215,000 consumers voted for over 4,500 brands, and the annual ceremony saw 316 brands from 56 countries honoured. David Croft hosted the event.

== Winners ==
=== 2014 Winners ===
The London awards ceremony in 2014 saw 69 brands from 25 countries awarded. Global winners included: Apple Inc., Coca-Cola, Del Monte, Heinz, HSBC, Louis Vuitton, McDonald's, Samsung, Sony PlayStation, and VISA. National tier winners include Barclays, the BBC, British Airways, Thomas Cook, the University of Oxford, LEGO, Ferrari, Royal Dutch Shell, Silentnight, and Burj Al Arab Jumeirah. Each brand is named Brand of the Year in their respective categories. The awards gave special recognition to Tony Fernandes, Group CEO of AirAsia, naming him Brand Builder of the Year for his outstanding work in building the airline brand.

At the 2014–2015 Paris awards ceremony, 50 brands from 22 countries were awarded. Global winners included Cartier, Club Med, Evian, Gillette, Gucci, Hermès, Hilton Hotels & Resorts, IKEA, L'Oréal, Moët & Chandon, Nike, Inc., Prada, and UPS. National tier winners included: Penfolds (Australia); China Telecom; Media Markt (Germany); Taj Hotels Resorts and Palaces (India); Indosat (Indonesia); NTT Docomo (Japan); SK Telecom (Korea); Pos Malaysia; Campina (Netherlands); SMRT (Singapore); Telkom (South Africa); Roche (Switzerland); Chunghwa Telecom (Taiwan); and Eurostar (UK). Each brand was named Brand of the Year in their respective categories.

=== 2015 Winners ===
Kensington Palace in London was the site of the 2015–2016 awards ceremony. 118 brands from 30 countries were awarded. Global winners included: Apple Inc., Cartier, Coca-Cola, Facebook, Google, Guinness, HSBC, IKEA, Johnnie Walker, Kleenex, LEGO, Louis Vuitton, McDonald's, Mercedes-Benz, Nescafé, Nike, Inc., Rolex, Shell, Starbucks, and VISA. National tier winners from around the world include ANZ Bank from Australia, Sinopec from China, Hugo Boss from Germany, Airtel from India, Prada from Italy, Seiko from Japan, Samsung from Korea, Gulf Insurance Group from Kuwait, Maybank from Malaysia, KLM from the Netherlands, Babcock University from Nigeria, HBL Bank from Pakistan, Tanduay Rum from the Philippines, Chunghwa Telecom from Taiwan, MTN Group from South Africa, Santander Group from Spain, Singha Beer from Thailand, Dubai Duty Free from the UAE, and Royal Mail from the United Kingdom. RAK Ceramics won a regional award for being one of the largest brands in its category in the Middle East.

=== 2016 Winners ===
The 2016–2017 awards ceremony took place in Kensington Palace, where 210 brands from 30 countries were awarded. Apple, BMW, the British Council, Cartier, Coca-Cola, Facebook, Google, LEGO, L'Oréal, Louis Vuitton, McDonald's, Nescafé, Nike, Oral-B, Pampers, Rolex, Samsung, Starbucks, Schwarzkopf, and VISA were announced as global winners.

National tier winners included: ICBC (China), Bang & Olufsen (Denmark), Hermès (France), Nivea (Germany), Chow Tai Fook (Hong Kong), State Bank of India, Indomilk (Indonesia), Prada (Italy), Sukiya (Japan), Maybank (Malaysia), Dulux (Netherlands), SM Supermalls (Philippines), Sberbank (Russia), Nando's (South Africa), AmorePacific (South Korea), Santander (Spain), King Power (Thailand), Zurich (Switzerland), Dubai Duty Free (UAE), and Prudential (UK), among others.

Regional winners included: Eu Yan Sang, Giordano, Lee Kum Kee, Mandarin Oriental and Watsons from Hong Kong; Indomie (Indonesia); Ajinomoto, Isetan, Kikkoman, and Uniqlo from Japan; MTN from South Africa; Zara (Spain); and RAK Ceramics (UAE).

=== 2018 Winners ===
==== Global Edition ====
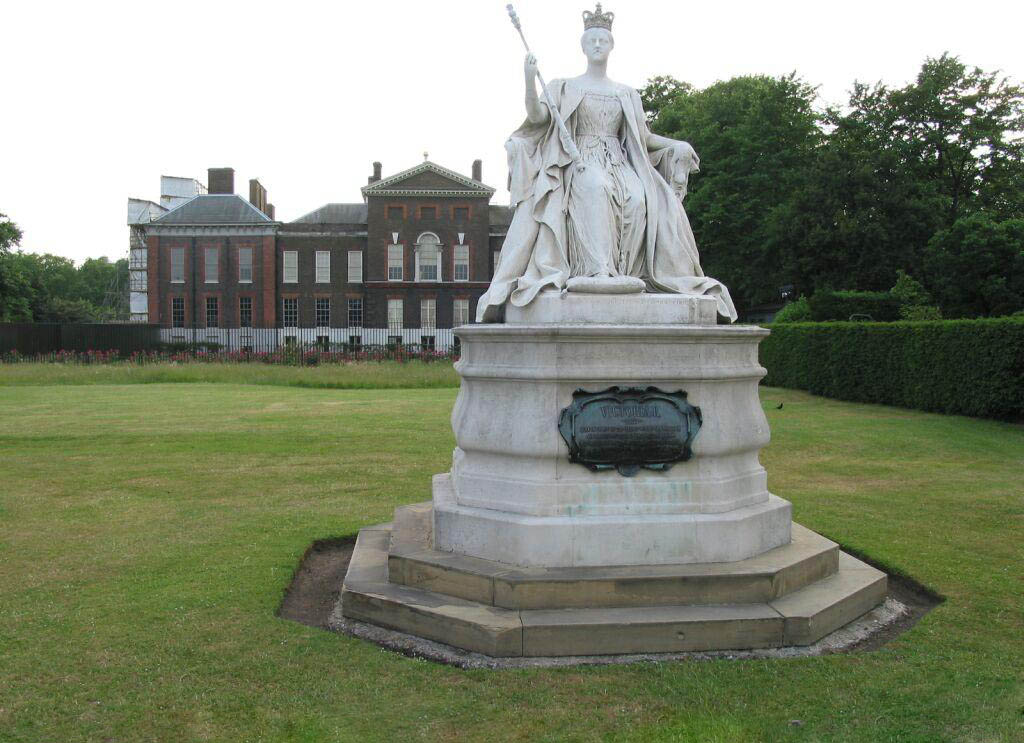
The World Branding Awards from 2015 to 2018 were held at London's Kensington Palace, home of the World Branding Awards

The 2018-2019 awards ceremony was held at Kensington Palace in London, which saw 270 winners from 33 countries awarded "Brand of the Year". More than 4,500 brands from 57 countries were nominated for the 2018–2019, and 351 brands from 49 countries were declared winners.

Global tier winners were: Beijing Tong Ren Tang, BMW, Cartier, Club Med, JinkoSolar, Johnnie Walker, L'Oréal, LEGO, Louis Vuitton, Nescafé, Rolex, Samsung, Secret Recipe, Schwarzkopf, and Yakult.

==== Americas Edition ====
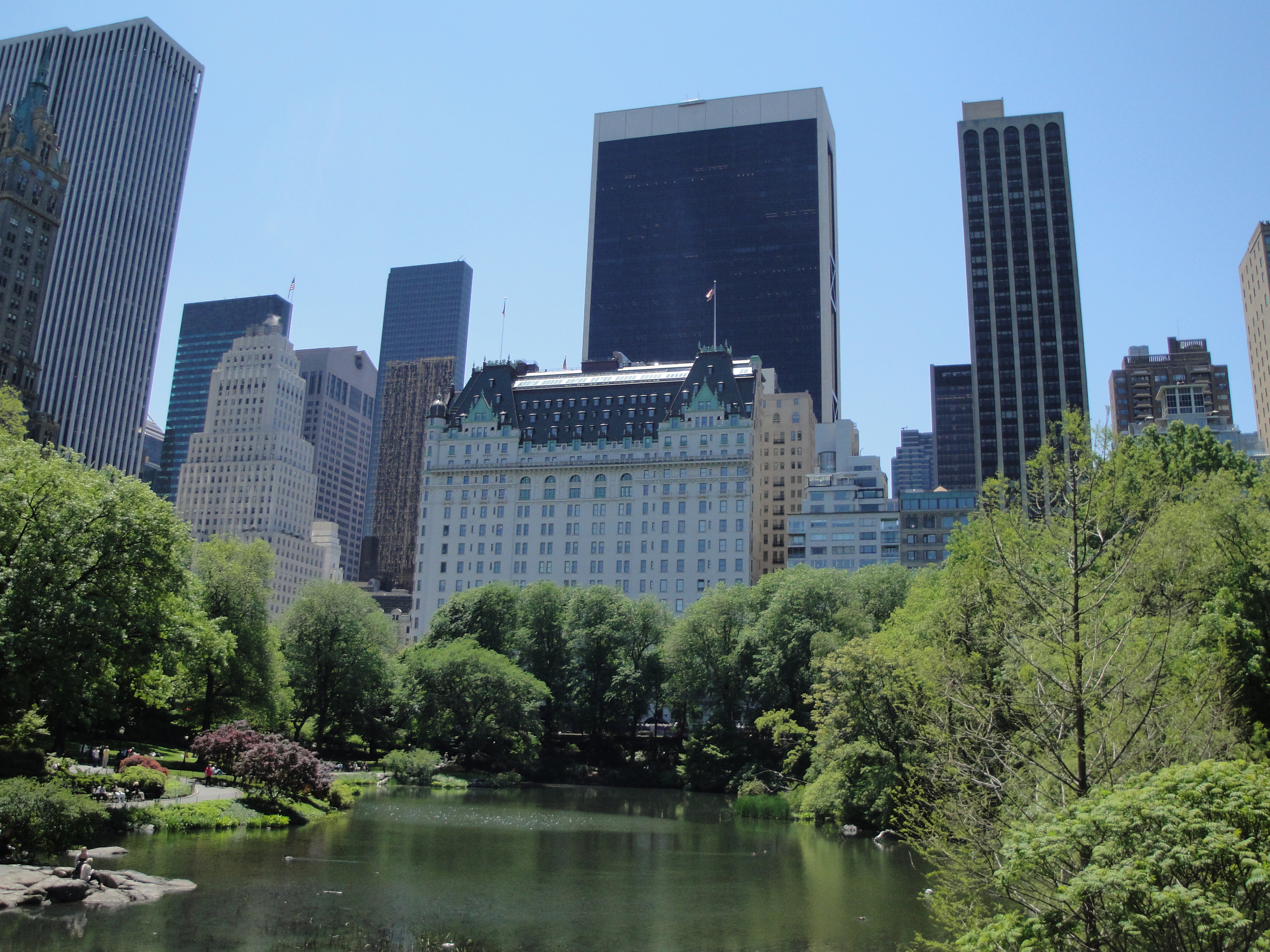
The Americas edition took place at the Plaza Hotel in New York.

The 2018–2019 Americas Edition, a biennial edition of the World Branding Awards, took place at the Plaza Hotel on Fifth Avenue in New York City. Hosted by comedian Moody McCarthy, the awards saw more than 1,500 Americas and Caribbean brands from 22 countries participate, and 81 brands from 16 countries awarded.

=== 2020 Winners ===
Due to the COVID-19 pandemic, no live events were held and the awards went virtual for the first time. More than 4,000 brands from over 45 countries were nominated for the 2020-2021 World Branding Awards across multiple categories. Of these, less than 450 brands were declared winners. Countries that did not receive enough votes did not qualify.

=== 2021 Winners ===
Both the Animalis and Main Global Editions of the Awards were held virtually. These included live recording on set at the Palace.

=== 2022 Winners ===
The awards returned to a live event at Kensington Palace. More than 3,500 brands from over 45 countries were nominated for the 2022-2023 World Branding Awards across multiple categories. Of these, 250 brands were declared winners.

=== 2023 Winners ===
More than 150,000 consumers took part to find this year's Brand of the Year winners. 1,500 brands from 40 countries were nominated across multiple categories, of these only 200 brands were declared winners. The Award Ceremony welcomed over 100 guests from around the world to celebrate the success and achievements of some of the World's Best Brands, at the home of the awards, Kensington Palace hosted by Sky Sport' David Croft.

== Presenters ==
For the 2014 awards, the London ceremony at One Whitehall Place was presented by David Croft from Sky Sports, while French actress Sara Verhagen presented the Paris ceremony. Magician Ben Hanlin from ITV2's Tricked (TV series)|Tricked and Discovery Channel's Breaking Magic also performed at the Paris event.

The 2015 awards ceremony at Kensington Palace was presented by Olivia Wayne from Sky Sports, and David Croft presented the 2016, 2017 and 2018 awards.

The 2017 and 2019 Animalis Edition in Vienna was presented by Stuart Freeman, whilst comedian Moody McCarthy hosted the 2018 Americas Edition of the awards in New York.
