= WBFS =

WBFS may refer to:

- WBFS-TV, a television station in Miami, Florida, United States
- West Bengal Fire Service, India
- .wbfs, a file format for storing Wii ROMs on external memory

== See also ==
- WBF (disambiguation)
