= WBF =

WBF may refer to:

International organisations

- The World Backgammon Federation, the international body for backgammon
- The World Badminton Federation, a governing body in badminton
- The World Banana Forum, an initiative to promote sustainable production and trade
- The World Baptist Fellowship, a Christian organization
- The World Bodybuilding Federation, a defunct bodybuilding organization
- The World Bodypainting Festival, a bodypainting festival
- The World Boxing Federation, or other sanctioning bodies for boxing with the same abbreviation
- The World Branding Forum, a global nonprofit branding industry organization
- The World Bridge Federation, a governing body in contract bridge
- The World Business Forum, a global summit for business executives

Other uses

- The WoodenBoat Forum, an online forum where people discuss wooden boats and other subjects
- The Windows Biometric Framework, support for fingerprint biometric devices. See Features new to Windows 7.
