= Hunnington railway station =

Former railway station in England

Coordinates: 52.4301°N 2.0477°W

Hunnington
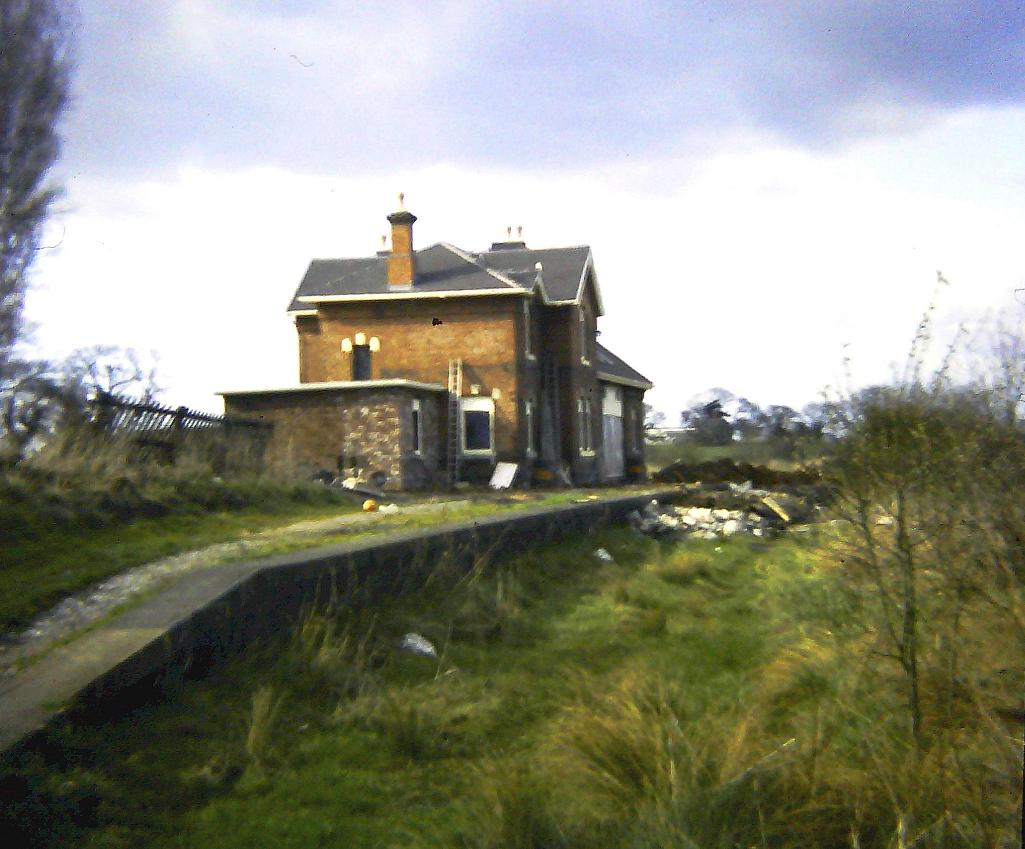
- The site of the station in 1977

General information
- Location: Hunnington, Bromsgrove, Worcestershire; England
- Platforms: 1

Other information
- Status: Disused

History
- Original company: Halesowen Railway
- Pre-grouping: Halesowen Joint Railway
- Post-grouping: Halesowen Joint Railway

Key dates
- 1883: Opened
- 1919: regular passenger service withdrawn
- 1958: Closed completely
Location

Hunnington railway station was a railway station in the village of Hunnington, near Halesowen, England, on the Great Western Railway and Midland Railway's joint Halesowen Railway line from Old Hill to Longbridge.

== Structure ==
The station had only a single platform but had its own sidings, which served the now closed Blue Bird Toffee factory.

== History ==
Advertised public passenger services were withdrawn in 1919 but workmen's trains continued until 1958.

== Present day ==
Unlike most of the other former stations and infrastructure of the Halesowen Railway, Hunnington station building still remains as a private residence.

Preceding station	Disused railways	Following station
Halesowen; Line and station closed	Great Western Railway and Midland Railway; Halesowen Railway	Rubery; Line and station closed
