= Land of Lost Content (museum) =

Museum in Craven Arms, Shropshire, England

Coordinates: 52.4398°N 2.8334°W

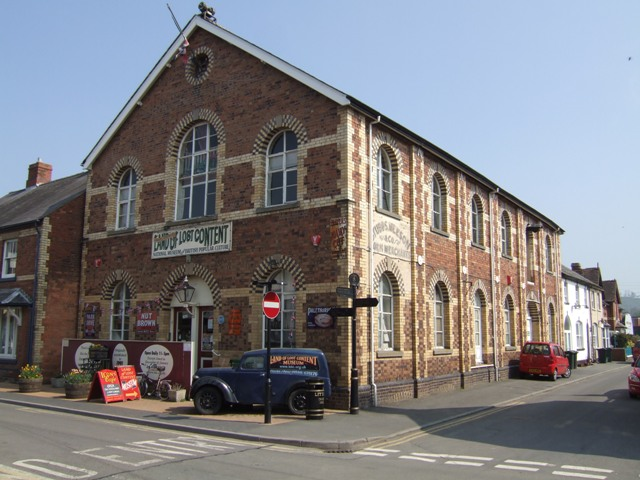
Front of the museum in 2011

The Land of Lost Content was a museum in Craven Arms, Shropshire, that collected everyday objects such as toys, magazines and packaging.

The museum's name was taken from Poem XL in A. E. Housman's collection A Shropshire Lad.

== History ==
The museum was founded by Stella Mitchell, who had begun collecting everyday objects while studying art in Birmingham in the 1970s. She opened her first museum in 1991 with her husband Dave in West Sussex, before moving to Craven Arms in 2003. Its final premises occupied the town's former market hall, constructed in 1888, which the couple bought for £165,000. It contained 37 separate displays spread out over four floors.

In 2018, the museum was threatened with closure because it did not meet modern safety standards. The owners retrofitted the premises with additional fire doors and extinguishers.

In 2023, the premises closed following legal problems over co-ownership with Wayne Hemingway. Two years later, the property was put up for sale.

== Collections ==
Objects in the museum included a variety of Chad Valley toys, bluebirds taken from the gates of the Blue Bird Toffee factory, tickets from the first National Lottery in 1994 and a Sinclair C5.

The museum was run without any funding or sponsorship and relied on word of mouth to build a reputation for its collections and displays. All of the museum's objects were popular and in everyday use at some point since the late Victorian era. Though many items were mass-produced with no perceived value when collected by the museum, they have since acquired significance as they are attached to visitors' personal memories and a view to how people used to live.

== Donations ==
The Land of Lost Content has donated objects in its collections to various other museums and exhibitions. These include a 50th anniversary commemoration of the Festival of Britain in 2011, supplying 1930s posters to the Black Country Living Museum and furnishing a flat with contemporary objects in Balfron Tower as part of a National Trust display of Brutalist architecture in 2014.

== See also ==
- Museum of Brands
