= Longbridge railway station =

Railway station in the West Midlands, England

Longbridge
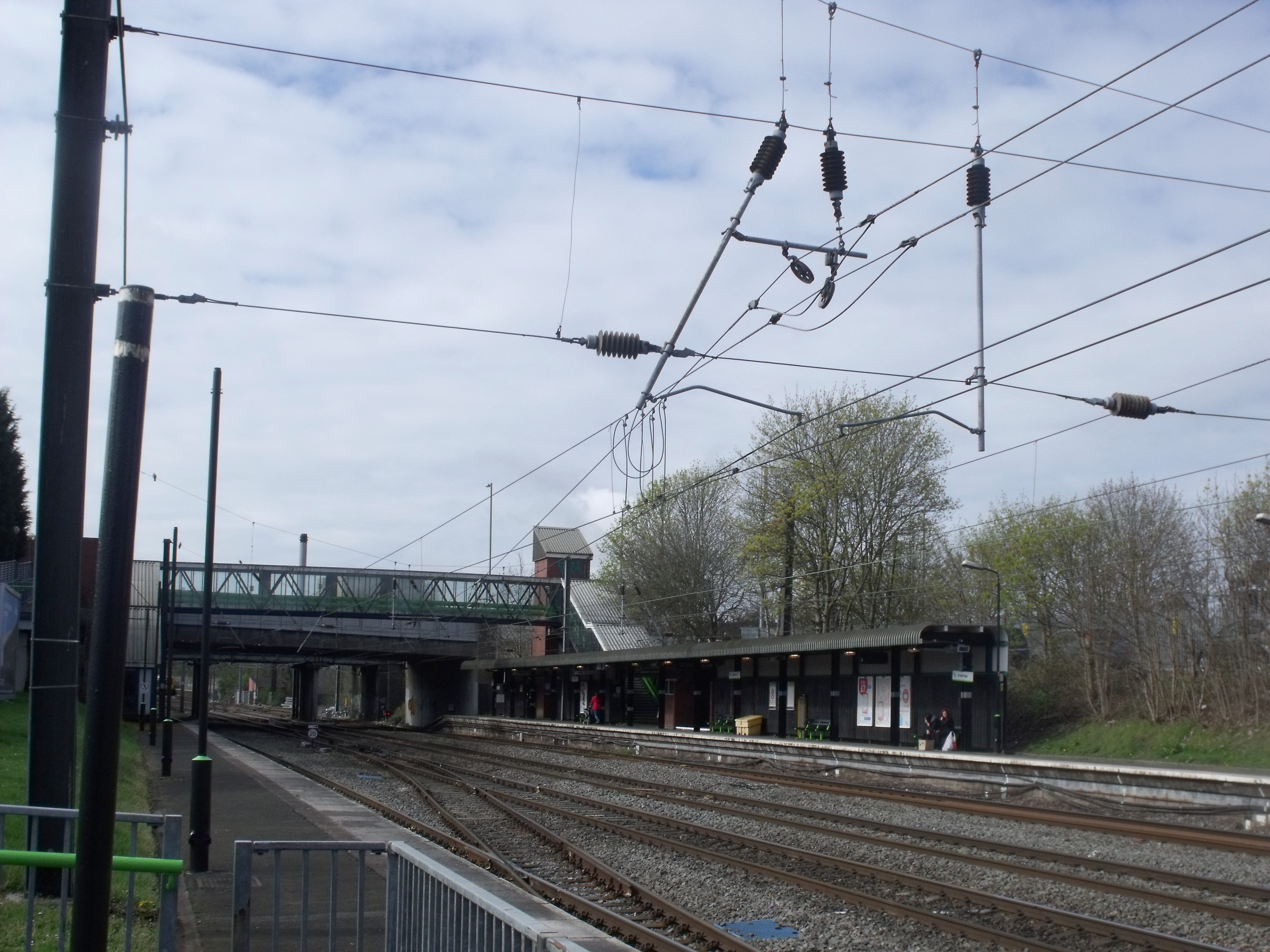
- Longbridge station in 2012

General information
- Location: Longbridge, Birmingham; England
- Coordinates: 52.396°N 1.980°W
- Grid reference: SP013775
- Manager: West Midlands Railway
- Transit authority: Transport for West Midlands
- Platforms: 2

Other information
- Station code: LOB
- Fare zone: 4
- Classification: DfT category E

History
- Original company: Birmingham and Gloucester Railway

Key dates
- 15 November 1841: Station opened
- 1 May 1849: Closed
- 8 May 1978: Reopened

Passengers
- 2021/22: ▲0.525 million
- 2022/23: ▲0.686 million
- 2023/24: ▲0.817 million
- 2024/25: ▲0.892 million
- 2025/26: ▲0.966 million
Location
Notes
- Passenger statistics from the Office of Rail and Road

Longbridge railway station serves the Longbridge, Rednal, Rubery and West Heath areas in the far south-west of Birmingham, England. It is on the Cross City Line. The station, and all trains calling there, are operated by West Midlands Trains.

== History ==
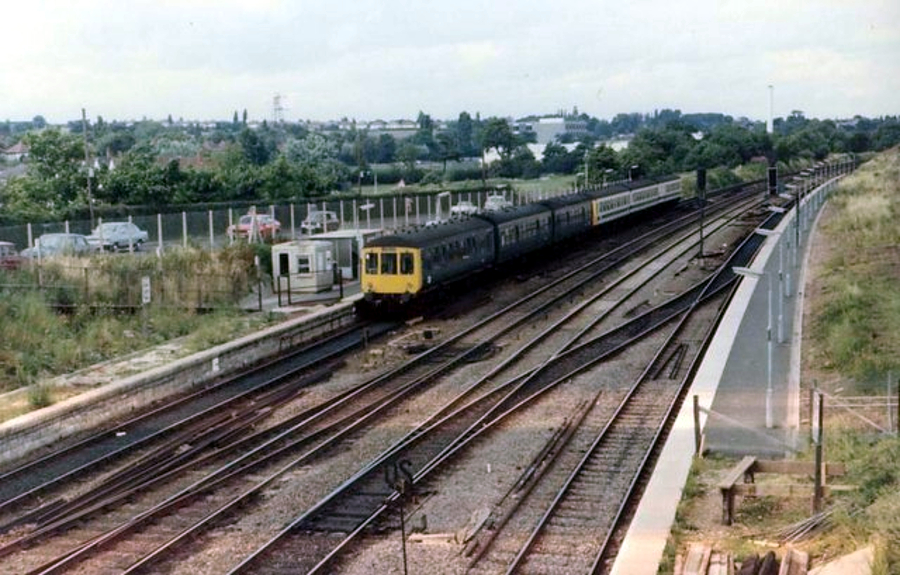
Longbridge station in August 1979, still incomplete; it had opened the previous year

Two previous stations serving Longbridge have existed. The first was opened at a location just south of the current station, in either 1840 or 1841, when the original Birmingham and Gloucester Railway opened; it did not prosper and closed in 1849.

Another Longbridge station had existed nearby, on the Halesowen Railway branch to Old Hill; this station only ever served workman's trains and operated between 1915 and 1964. Until closure of much of the Longbridge factory, the disused track and Longbridge station building remained in situ.

The current station, on Tessall Lane, was built to the designs of the architect John Broome and opened in 1978 under the auspices of British Rail, as part of the West Midlands Passenger Transport Executive's Cross-City Line scheme. It was built as a simple two platform station on the four-track line, with a turnback siding just south of the station for terminating services. Initially, nearly all Cross-City Line services terminated here, until 1980 when some were extended to Redditch. The line was electrified in 1993.

== Facilities ==
The station has a ticket office, staffed seven days a week; there are also ticket machines. There is a car park, with spaces for 44 bicycles. It also has a disabled toilet, accessible via a RADAR key.

The station has level access from Longbridge Lane. The ticket office and footbridge are both accessible at this station. Platform 1 (for services towards Birmingham New Street) has a lift facility, whereas platform 2 (for trains towards Redditch and Bromsgrove) has a ramp to the platform from the main station building. The ramp has been criticised for being too steep, with requests calling for the lift facility to be reinstated.

== Services ==
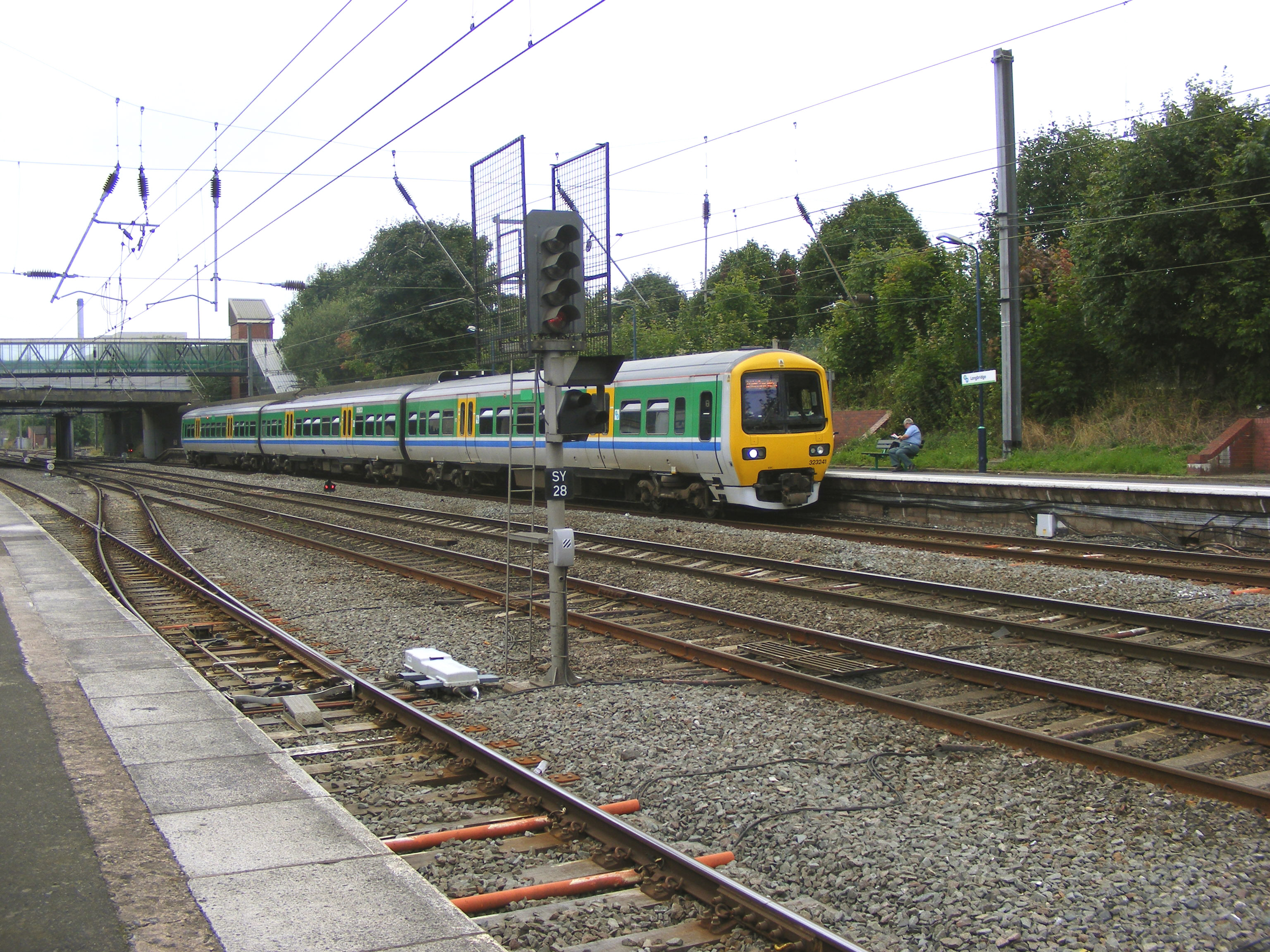
Platforms at Longbridge, with a Central Trains service departing towards Birmingham New Street

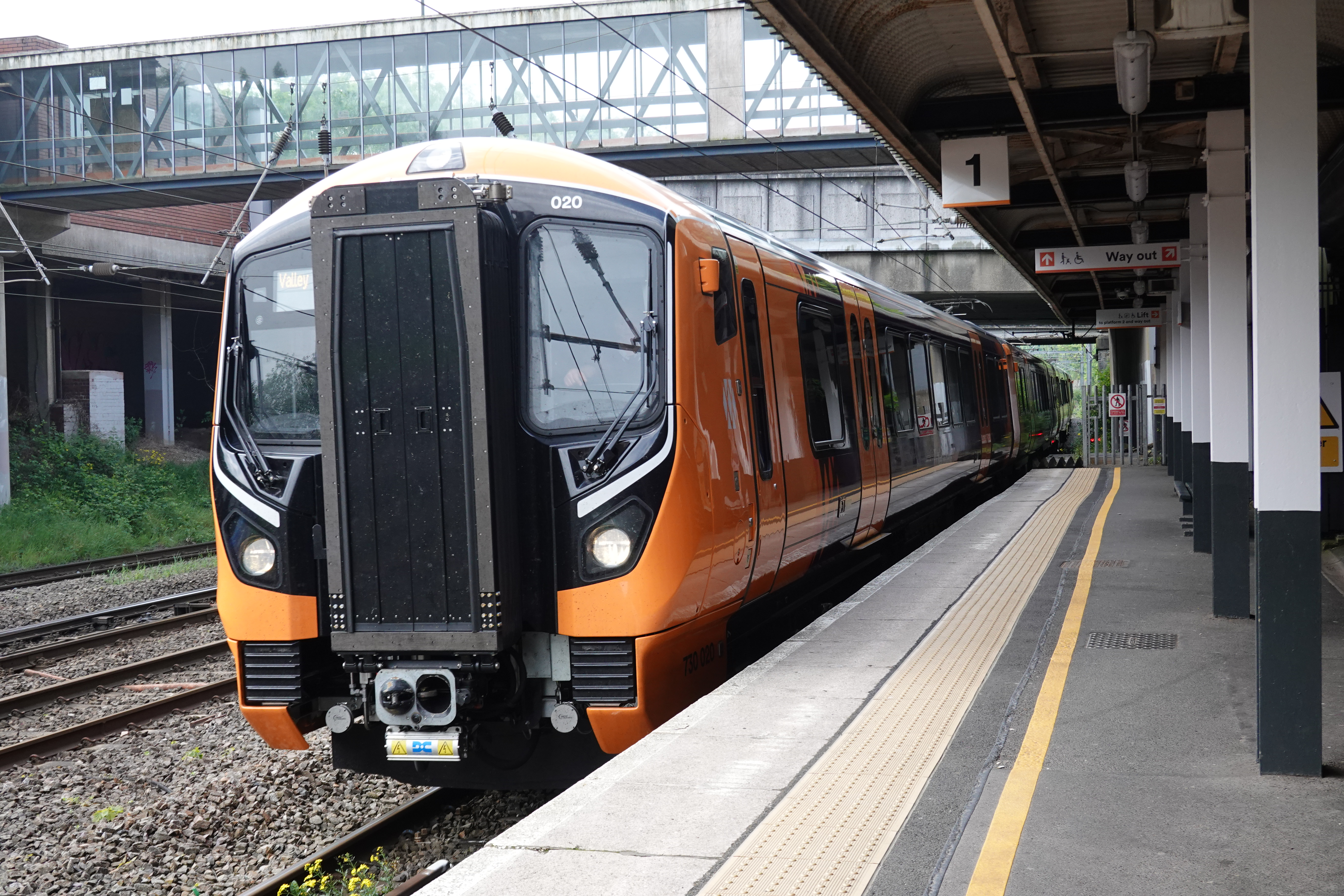
A West Midlands Railway train arriving at platform 1 in 2024

The station is served by West Midlands Trains with local Transport for West Midlands branded Cross-City services operated using Class 730 electric multiple units.

The off-peak service pattern is shown below.

Mondays to Saturdays:

- 4 trains per hour (tph) northbound to Four Oaks via University, Birmingham New Street and Sutton Coldfield, departing from platform 1; of which:
  - 2 tph continue to Lichfield Trent Valley via Lichfield City, calling at all stations except Duddeston
- 4 tph southbound to Barnt Green, departing from platform 2; of which:
  - 2 tph continue to Redditch via Alvechurch
  - 2 tph continue to Bromsgrove, 1 tph does not call at Barnt Green.

Sundays:

- 2 tph northbound to Lichfield Trent Valley
- 2 tph southbound to Redditch
- 1 tph northbound to Birmingham New Street
- 1 tph southbound to Bromsgrove.

Services on Sundays call at all stations between Lichfield Trent Valley and Redditch, then all stations between Bromsgrove and Birmingham New Street.

Since 29 July 2018, trains that used to terminate here were extended to Bromsgrove, except for a small number of early morning and late night trains, following the completion of a scheme to extend the Cross City electrification from Barnt Green.

Preceding station	National Rail	Following station
Northfield	West Midlands Railway Lichfield – Four Oaks – Birmingham – Bromsgrove/Redditch; Cross-City Line	Barnt Green
Northfield	West Midlands Railway Lichfield – Four Oaks – Birmingham – Bromsgrove/Redditch; Cross-City Line	Bromsgrove
Disused railways
Longbridge (1915-1964)	Great Western Railway Halesowen Railway	Terminus
Cofton	Birmingham and Gloucester Railway	Moseley
Croft Farm	Midland Railway	Terminus

== Future plans ==
In 2022, Network Rail published the West Midlands Strategic Rail Advice. This guide suggested that Longbridge becomes the main "secondary hub" along the CrossCity South, having direct links to Nottingham, Cardiff, Hereford, and the South West. The station would see approximately 32 services per hour.

This station could also be part of the newly reinstated Camp Hill line.
