= Halesowen railway station =

Former railway station in Halesowen, West Midlands, England

Halesowen
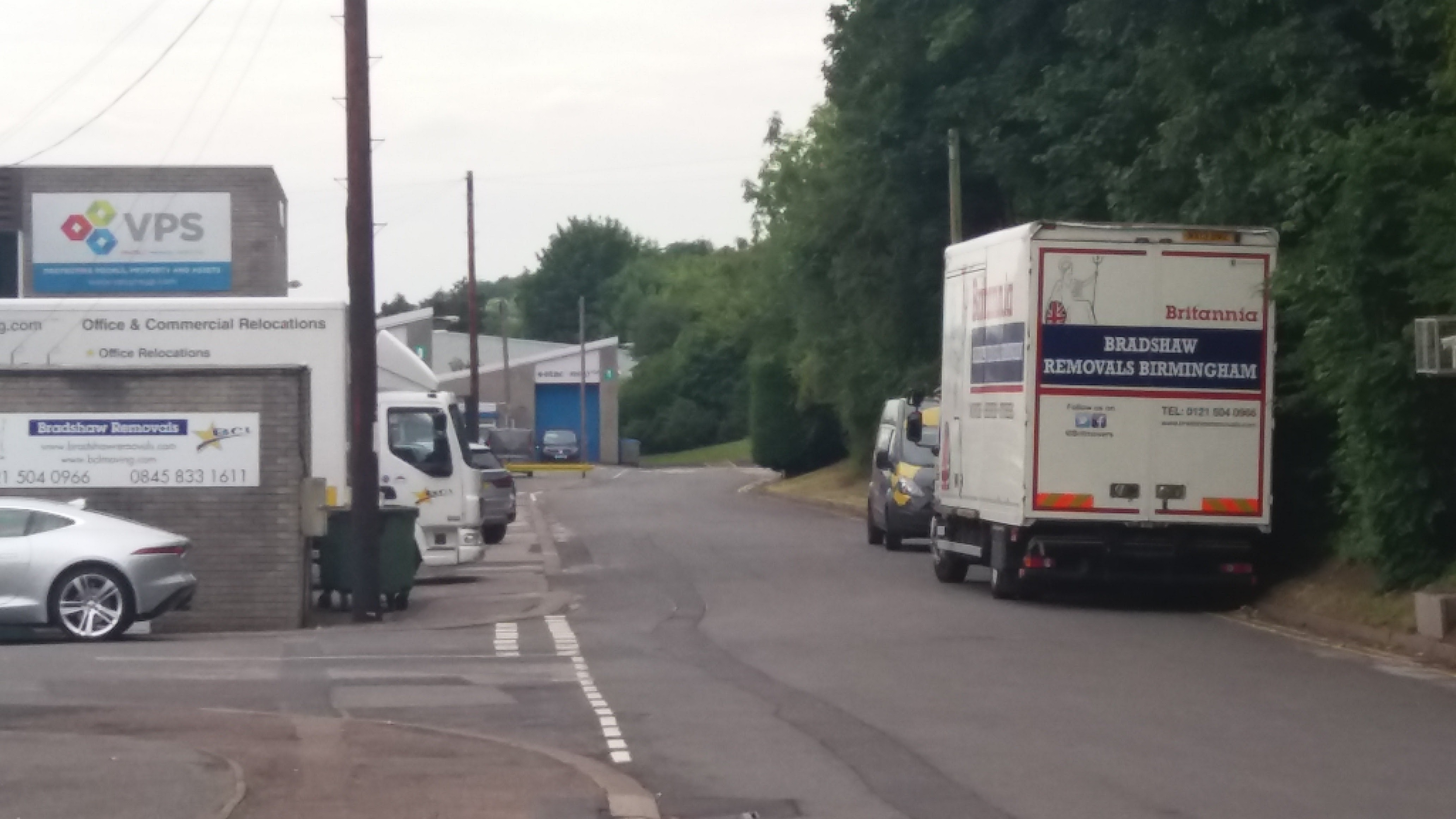
- The site of Halesowen railway station, now in use as an industrial estate.

General information
- Location: Halesowen, Metropolitan Borough of Dudley; England
- Coordinates: 52.4541°N 2.0422°W
- Grid reference: SO972840
- Platforms: 2

Other information
- Status: Disused

History
- Original company: Midland Railway and Great Western Railway joint

Key dates
- 1 March 1878: Opened
- 5 December 1927: Closed to passengers. Workmens trains continued.
- 29 August 1958: Workmens trains withdrawn
- 1964: Line closed completely
Location

Halesowen railway station was a railway station in Halesowen, West Midlands, England on the Great Western Railway and Midland Railway's joint Halesowen Railway line from Old Hill to Longbridge.

== History ==
The station opened in 1878, it had a very short life in terms of passenger services. All of the station, lines and passenger services ceased in 1927 except a few factory worker trains which served the Austin Rover Works in Longbridge until 1958.

The station had yard facilities and a small branch to the Hawne Basin on the Dudley Canal, with freight services continuing until the closure of the line in 1964.

== Preservation ==
The track bed remains undeveloped but Halesowen railway station has been demolished. The station site is an industrial site on the bottom of Mucklow Hill (which used to pass over the railway line on a bridge) next to Halesowen College.

Preceding station	Disused railways	Following station
Coombes Holloway Halt; Line and station closed	Great Western Railway and Midland Railway; Halesowen Railway	Hunnington; Line and station closed
