= Dowery Dell Viaduct =

Railway viaduct that carried the Halesowen to Longbridge railway

Coordinates: 52.423374°N 2.039359°W

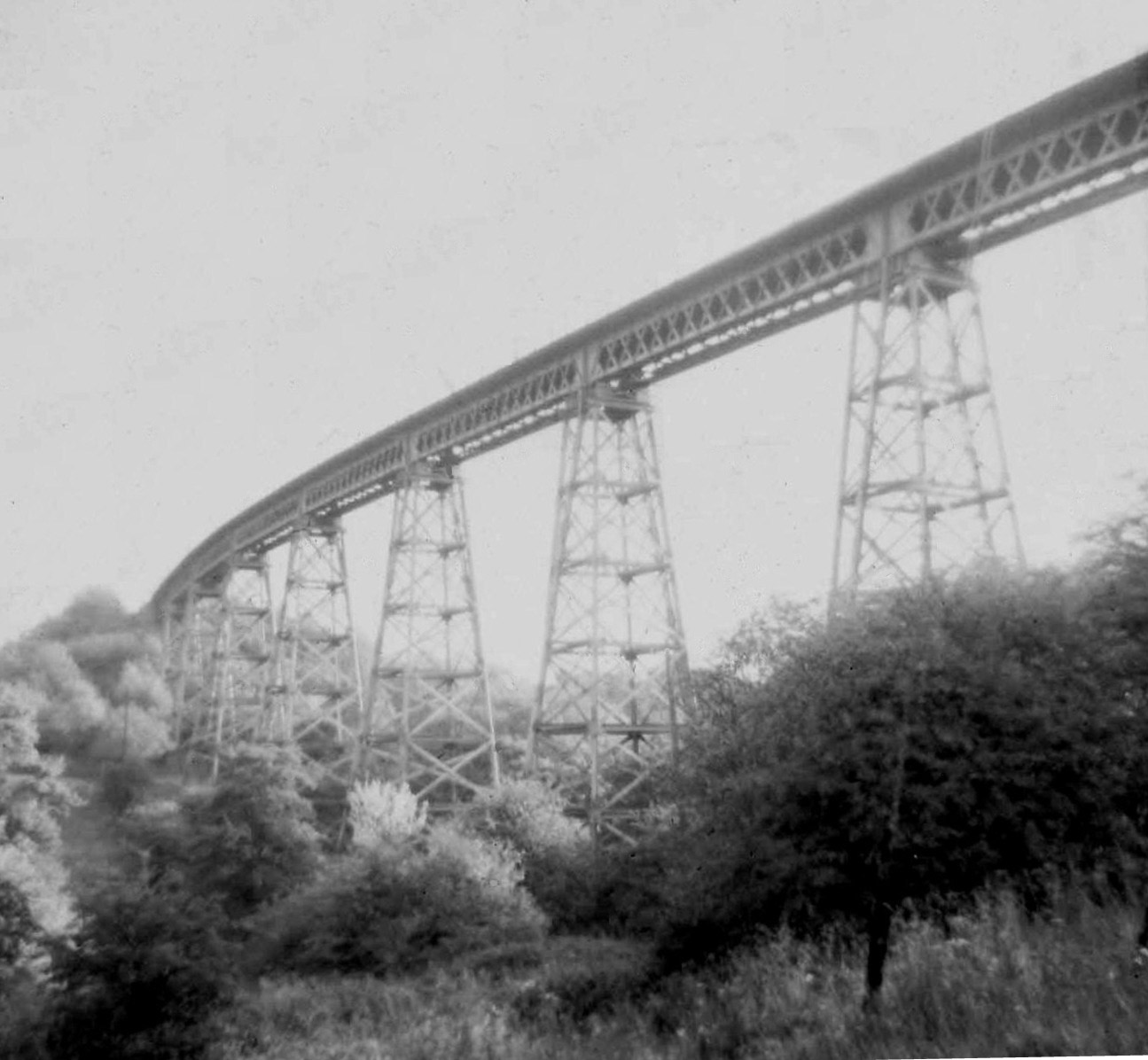
Dowery Dell Viaduct

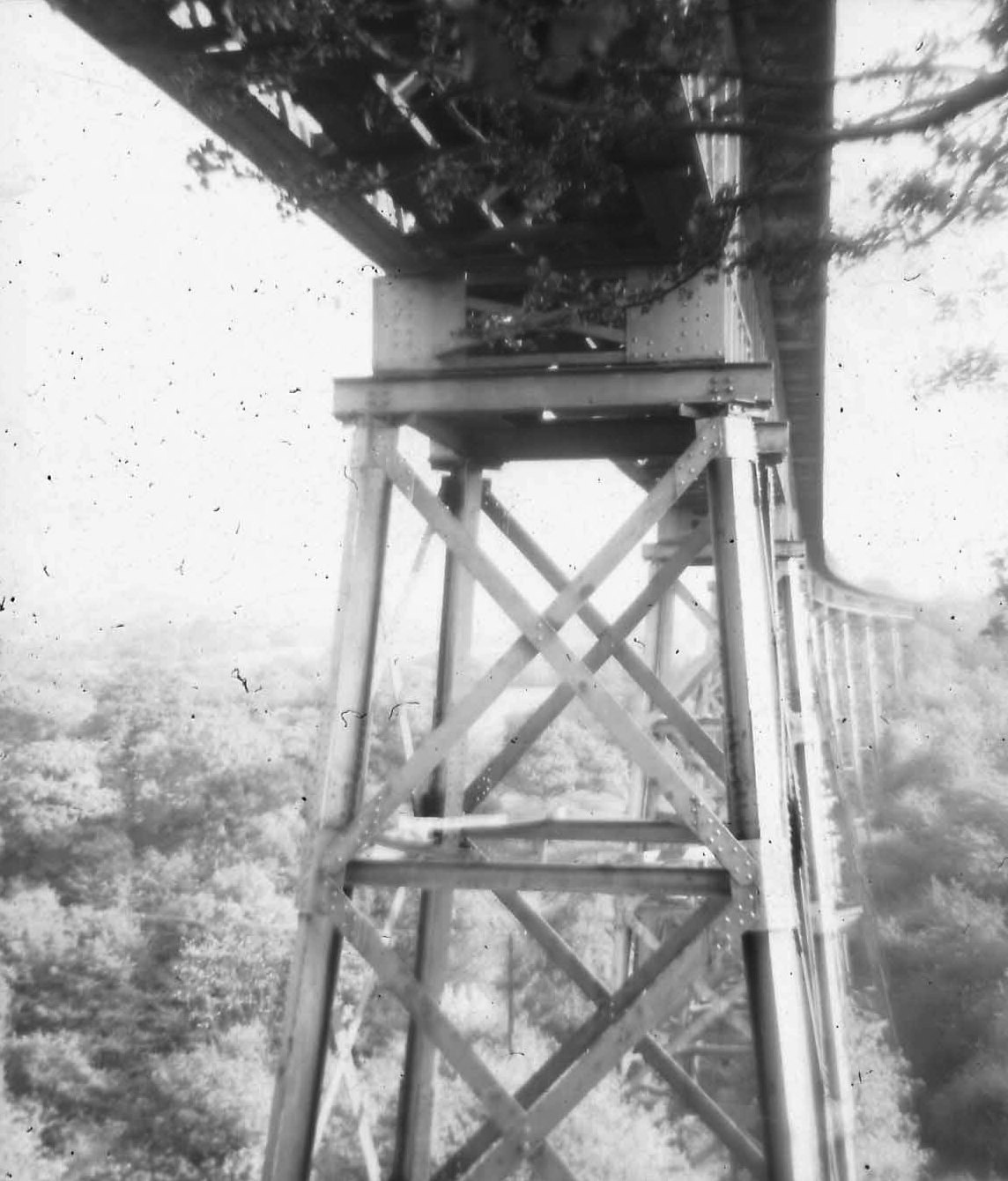
Dowery Dell Viaduct showing one pier

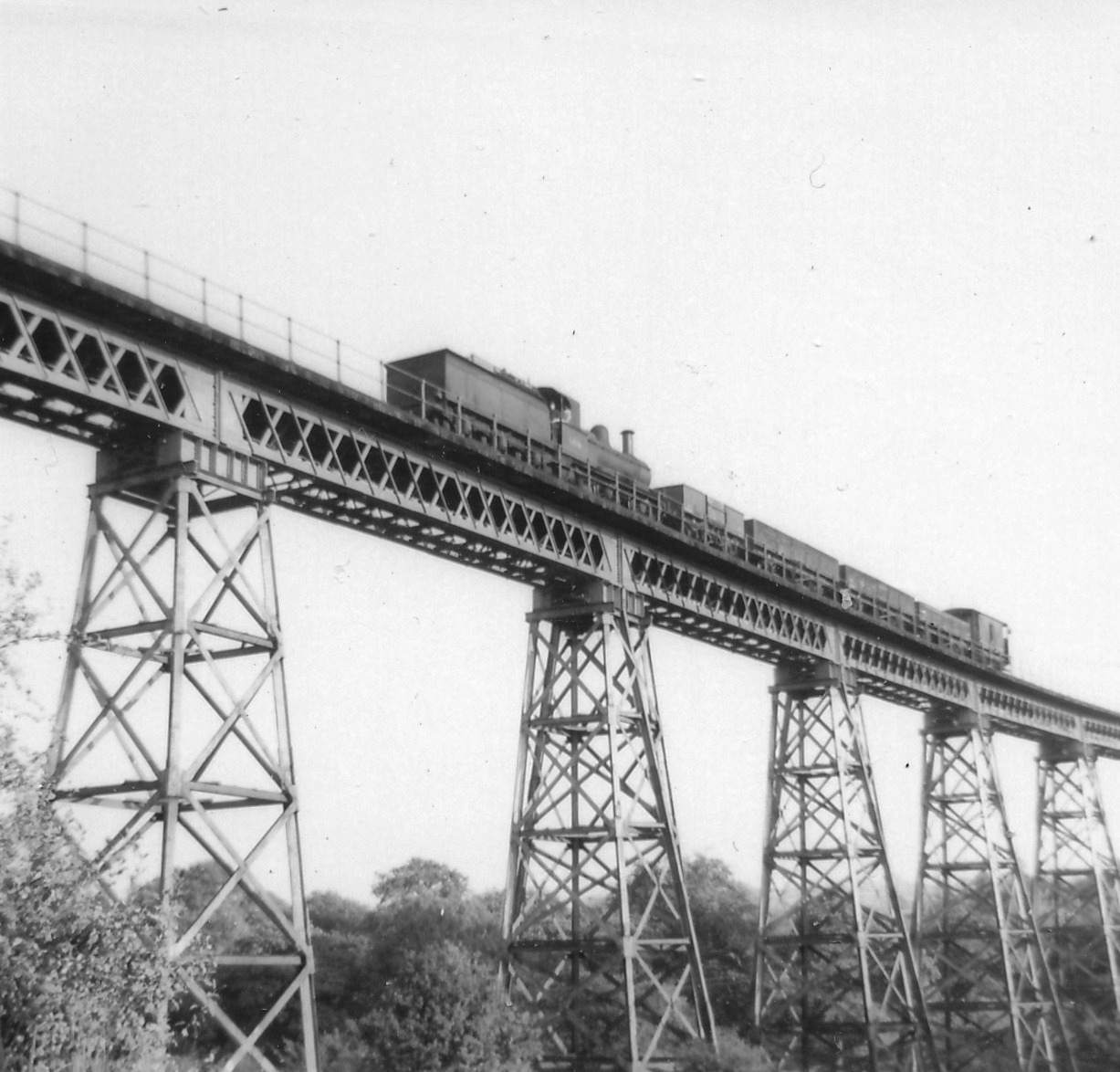
Dowery Dell Viaduct with steam train passing towards Longbridge

Dowery Dell, between Rubery and Halesowen in Worcestershire, was a 234 yards (214 m), nine span lattice steel, single-track railway viaduct that carried the Halesowen to Longbridge railway. A 10 mph speed limit was in operation. The line opened in 1883. Trains ran until 1964 and the viaduct was dismantled in 1965.

== Similar structures ==
The viaduct was remarkable in being a rare example of a lattice girder supported on trestles, a combination of which there may have been only one other example in Britain, at Bennerley Viaduct (extant), though in that instance the trestles are not as high.

On other well-known trestle-supported viaducts, such as Meldon, Belah, and Crumlin, the superstructure is not a lattice, being typically a Warren truss; and other lattice girders are low structures supported typically on iron caissons, such as Kew Railway Bridge.

== Remains ==
A walk along the footpath that follows the railway route reveals the brick pillar bases that remain in the dell.
