= London Lighthouse =

AIDS hospice in London

- Merged into: Terrence Higgins Trust
- Formation: 1986
- Founder: Reverend Andrew Henderson, Christopher Spence MBE, John Shine
- Dissolved: 2013
- Type: Charitable organisation
- Purpose: HIV
- Headquarters: 111-117 Lancaster Road, London, UK, W11

London Lighthouse was a centre for people with HIV/AIDS. It was the world's largest centre for people living with HIV when it opened, and helped pioneer a patient-centred approach in HIV care, and housed a residential unit, as well as day-care and drop-in centre facilities.

The centre closed in 2013 and is now occupied by the Museum of Brands.

== History ==
London Lighthouse was co-founded by Christopher Spence MBE (Chief Executive Director), Andrew Henderson (Chairman) and John Shine. Almost £5 million was raised in order to suitably equip a residential unit with space for up to 23 patients with AIDS which opened in September 1988.

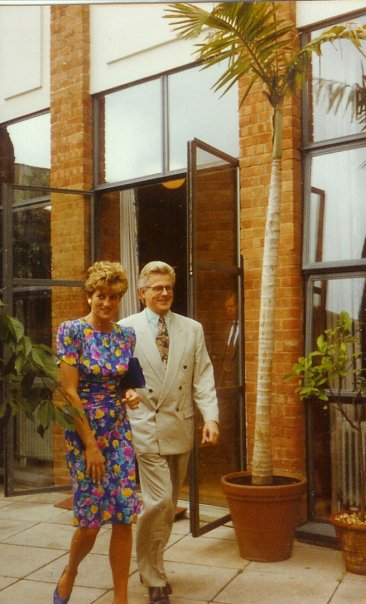
Diana, Princess of Wales, visits London Lighthouse in 1992

The official opening of London Lighthouse took place in November 1988 with a plaque unveiling by the late Princess Margaret. It was also frequently visited by Diana, Princess of Wales, both for public events and private visits. With the arrival of new treatments for HIV in the mid-1990s and a decline in funding, London Lighthouse reoriented towards lifelong support for people living with HIV, and its residential unit was closed.

In October 2000, London Lighthouse merged with another HIV charity, Terrence Higgins Trust. In 2013 Terrence Higgins Trust decided to close the facility to cut costs and in 2015 the Museum of Brands moved into the space. The memorial garden, in which the ashes of many people who have died at Lighthouse are scattered, was preserved. In 2021, an initiative was announced to create a UK National AIDS memorial to be located at the former London Lighthouse building. A rainbow plaque was unveiled on 17 November 2023.

Archive materials relating to London Lighthouse can be found at the Special Collections and Archives at the Bishopsgate Institute and also on the MayDay Radio website, including interviews and printed materials.

== See also ==
- HIV/AIDS in the UK
