= Coombes Holloway Halt railway station =

Former railway station in England

Coombes Holloway Halt

General information
- Location: Old Hill, Dudley; England
- Coordinates: 52.4602°N 2.0495°W
- Grid reference: SO967846
- Platforms: 1

Other information
- Status: Disused

History
- Pre-grouping: Midland Railway and Great Western Railway joint

Key dates
- 1905: Opened
- 1927: Closed
Location

Coombes Holloway Halt railway station was a railway station in Halesowen, England, on the Great Western Railway and Midland Railway's Joint Halesowen Railway line from Old Hill to Longbridge. The station was intermediate stopping point between Halesowen and Old Hill, and was only ¾ of a mile from Old Hill station. It had a short lived life as a station of only 22 years. The station site is now covered by a small industrial unit, alongside which the disused embankment can be seen.

Preceding station	Disused railways	Following station
Old Hill; Line closed, station open	Great Western Railway and Midland Railway; Halesowen Railway	Halesowen; Line and station closed
