= Rubery railway station =

Former railway station in England

Rubery
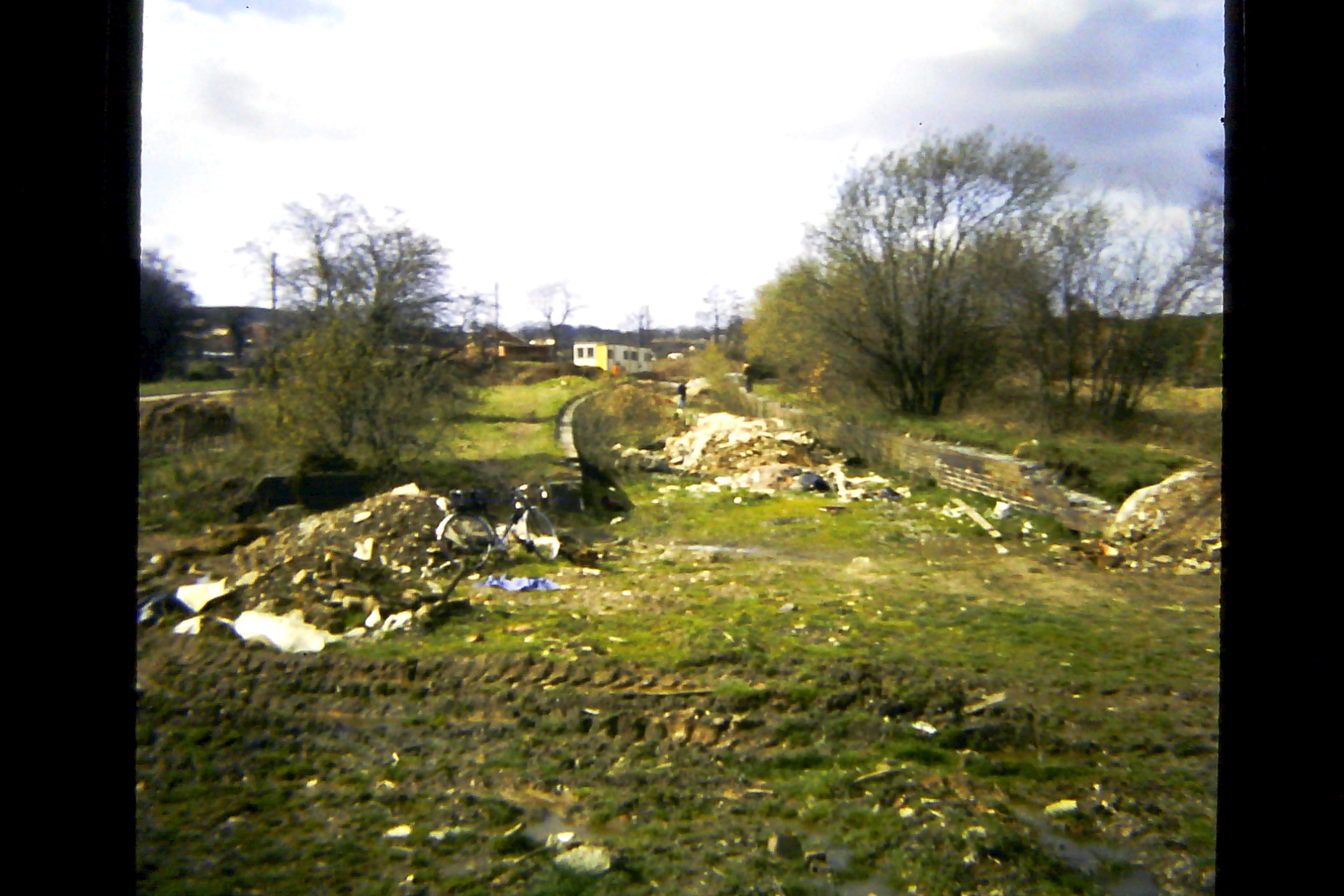
- The remains of the station platforms in 1977

General information
- Location: Rubery, Birmingham; England
- Coordinates: 52.4026°N 2.0151°W
- Grid reference: SO990782
- Platforms: 2

History
- Original company: Midland Railway and Great Western Railway joint
- Pre-grouping: Midland Railway and Great Western Railway joint
- Post-grouping: London, Midland and Scottish Railway and Great Western Railway joint

Key dates
- 10 September 1883: Opened
- April 1919: Closed for regular passenger trains
- 28 August 1960: Closed completely
Location

Rubery railway station was a railway station in Rubery, Birmingham, England, on the Great Western Railway and Midland Railway's joint Halesowen Railway line from Old Hill to Longbridge. The station closed in 1919 for regular services but workmen's trains continued until 1958. The station was the location of the only passing loop between Halesowen and Longbridge.

Preceding station	Disused railways	Following station
Hunnington; Line and station closed	Great Western Railway and Midland Railway; Halesowen Railway	Longbridge; Line and station closed
