= Longbridge railway station (1915–1964) =

Former railway station in England

Longbridge
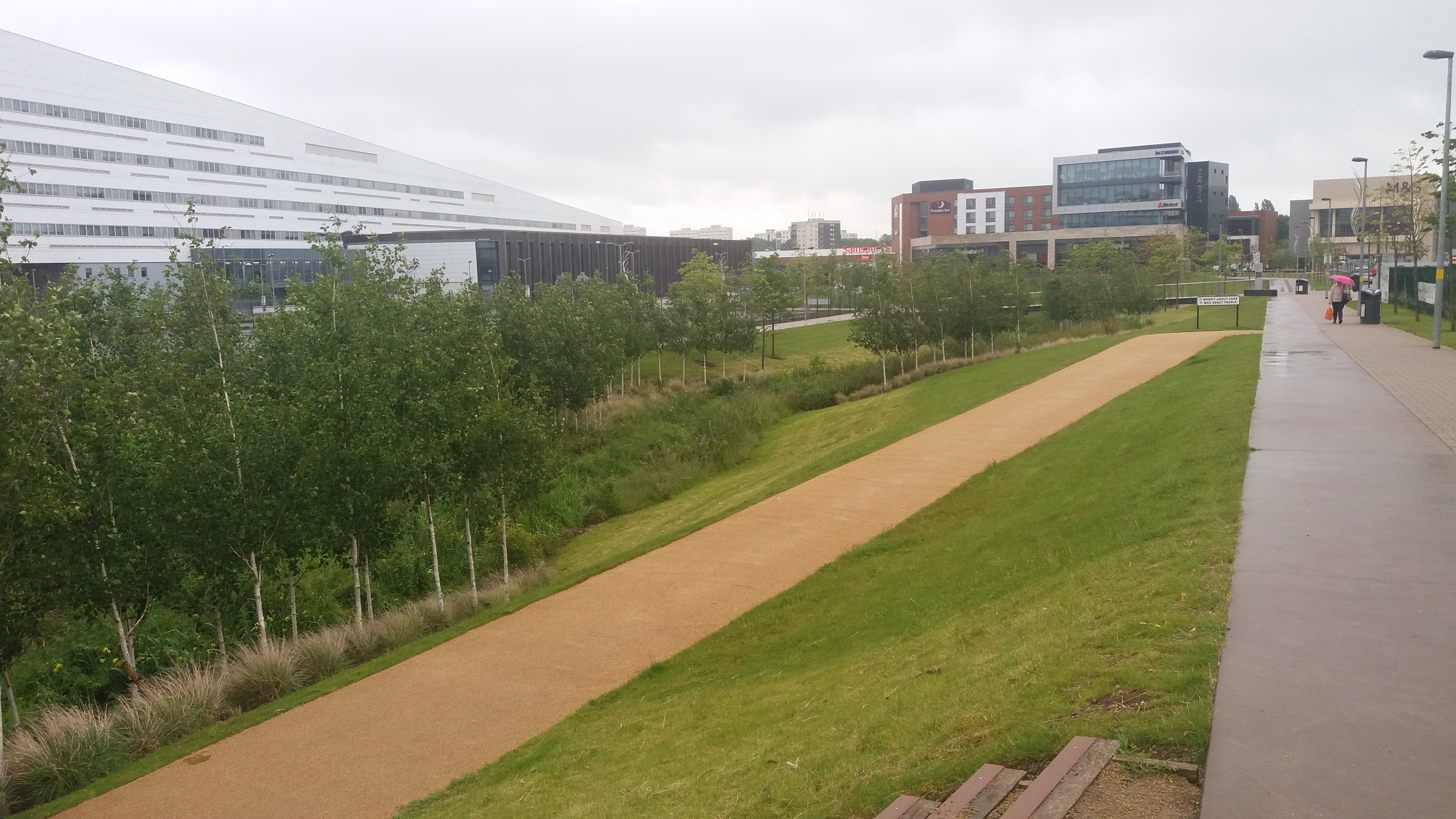

General information
- Location: Longbridge, Birmingham; England
- Coordinates: 52.3962°N 1.9899°W
- Grid reference: SP007775
- Platforms: 2

Other information
- Status: Disused

History
- Pre-grouping: Midland Railway and Great Western Railway joint
- Post-grouping: London, Midland and Scottish Railway and Great Western Railway joint

Key dates
- 5 July 1915: Opened
- 4 January 1960: Closed to passengers
- 1964: Closed to freight traffic
Location

Longbridge railway station was a railway station in Longbridge, Birmingham, England, on the Great Western Railway and Midland Railway's joint Halesowen Railway line from Old Hill to Longbridge. Despite closure, the railway station and part of the track remained in situ until the demolition of most of the Longbridge factory in 2006. The station should not be confused with the current station that was built in 1978, and is located on the Cross City Line.

Preceding station	Disused railways	Following station
Rubery; Line and station closed	Great Western Railway and Midland Railway; Halesowen Railway	Northfield; Line closed, station open
