= World Branding Forum =

Global nonprofit organization

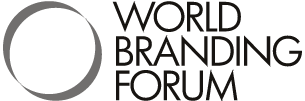
- Abbreviation: WBF
- Founded at: London, United Kingdom
- Type: Nonprofit organization
- Legal status: CIC
- Purpose: To raise the standards of branding for the good of consumers and the industry
- Headquarters: London, United Kingdom
- Region served: Worldwide
- Products: News publication, conferences, workshops and seminars
- Services: Brand and market research, best-practice standards development programme, student education programmes and awards programme
- Fields: Branding, advertising, marketing, public relations, communications, graphic design, product design and market research
- Official language: English
- Chairman: Richard Rowles
- Chief executive: Peter Pek
- Website: brandingforum.org

The World Branding Forum is a global nonprofit organisation based in London, England. The forum runs various programmes and organises conference, workshops and seminars. It operates a newsroom and publishes industry news on its website. It is also a media partner for various industry events. The forum's industry recognition programme is the World Branding Awards, which it organises annually.

== Background ==
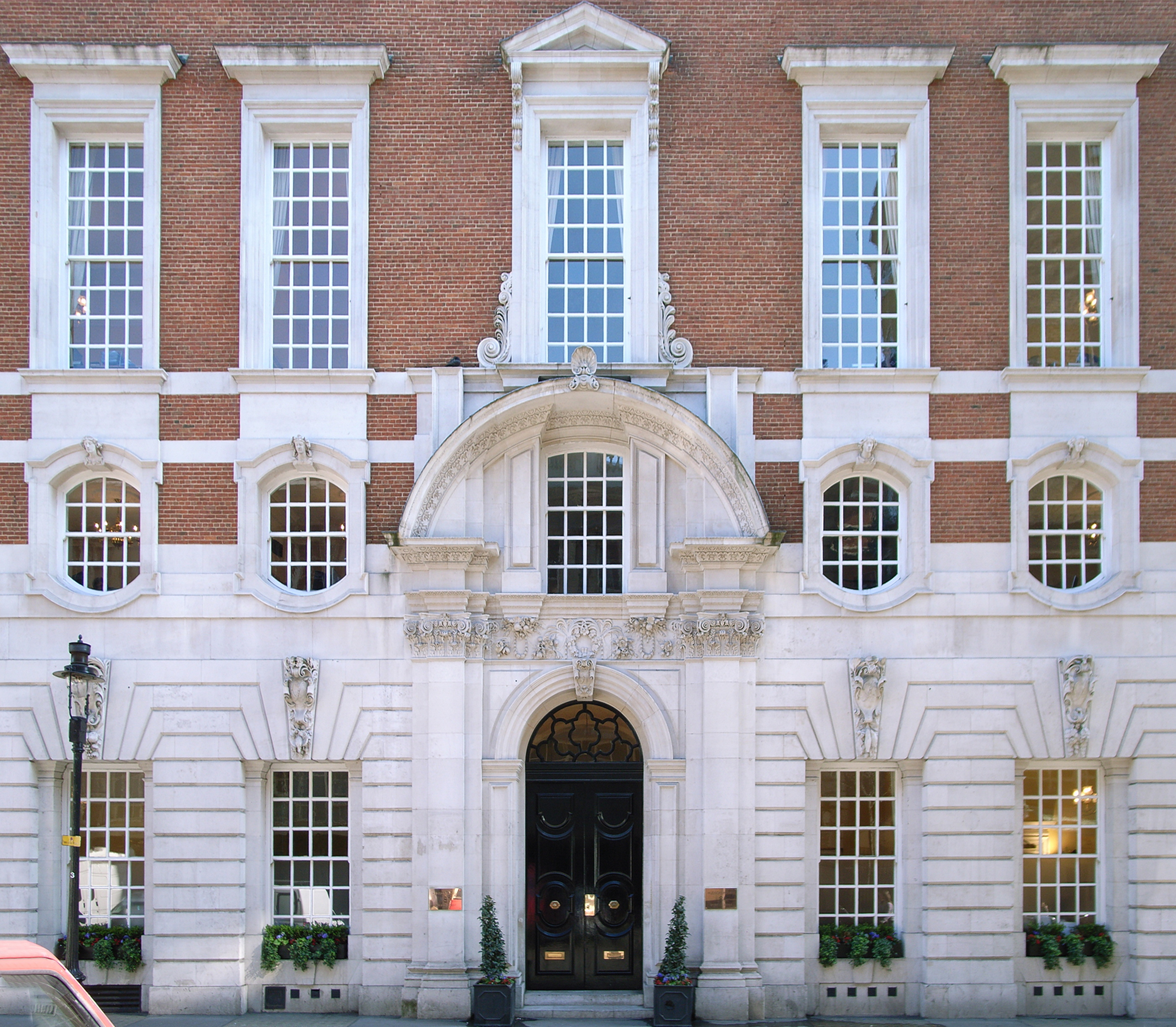
The World Branding Forum's offices in Covent Garden

The World Branding Forum is a global non-profit organisation. Its aims and activities are to raise the standards of branding for the good of consumers as well as the industry, including those who work in the branding, design, marketing, advertising, public relations and communications disciplines worldwide. Its chairman is Richard Rowles, and the brand strategist Peter Pek, is its chief executive.

The forum's headquarters are in Hudson House, a Grade II listed building in London's Covent Garden.

== Programmes ==
The forum runs various programmes including brand and market research, a best-practice standards development programme, and other student education programmes. It organises various conference, workshops and seminars. The forum's industry recognition programme is the World Branding Awards, which it organises annually.

== Sponsorships ==
In 2014, it sponsored The Harvard Project for Asian and International Relations (HPAIR) conference in Keio University, Tokyo, Japan. One of the Asia’s largest business and youth leadership gathering organized by students, the conference has featured speakers such as UN Secretary-General Ban Ki-moon, former Australian Prime Minister Kevin Rudd, director of the Earth Institute Professor Jeffrey Sachs, former President of the Republic of South Korea and 2000 Nobel Peace Prize Laureate Kim Dae Jung, and the Asia director of the World Economic Forum Frank Jurgen Richter. In 2016, it sponsored the HPAIR conference that was held at the Chinese University of Hong Kong.

In 2015, the World Branding Forum sponsored the education programme at the Museum of Brands, Packaging & Advertising. In 2014, the museum had over 10,000 students attending sessions.

The forum also provides a sponsorship grant to the Oxford Union, the debating society of the University of Oxford.

== World Branding Awards ==
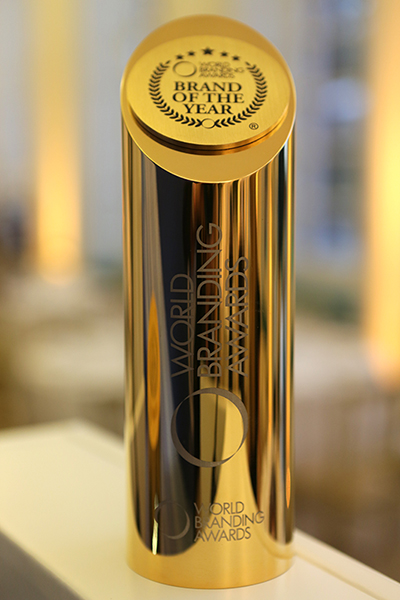
The World Branding Awards trophy is on display at the Museum of Brands, Packaging & Advertising in London

The World Branding Forum is the organiser of the World Branding Awards, an international award presented to some of the best global and national brands for their work and achievements in branding. It is also the owner of the award's "Brand of the Year" logo, which is a registered trademark.

There are three tiers of awards: a Global Award is presented to international brands that have a presence in ten or more countries, on three or more continents, limited to the top 100 global brands in any particular year; a Regional Award is presented to brands who are top in several countries in a particular geographic region; and a National Award which is presented to the very top brands in participating countries at the awards. Brands who are global winners are not awarded again on a national level.

The awards trophy is on display at the Museum of Brands, Packaging & Advertising in London.

The first awards were held in both London and Paris, with the first ceremony taking place in the One Whitehall Place in London in 2014. The second ceremony took place at the Hilton Paris Opera.

The 2015, 2016 and 2017 award ceremonies were held in Kensington Palace in London. In 2017, an Animalis edition, which focused on pet and animal brands, was held at the Hofburg Palace in Vienna. The Americas edition, which included brands from the Americas and the Caribbean, was held in 2018 at The Plaza on Fifth Avenue in New York City.

== Media and partnerships ==
The forum operates a newsroom, employing a team of writers who publishes industry news on its website. It is also an official media partner for various industry events including the Cannes Lions International Festival of Creativity, Real-Time Advertising Summit, the CMO Asia Summit, and CHARGE, an energy branding conference in Iceland.
