= Olivia Wayne =

British sports journalist

- Born: Olivia Jayne Godfrey; 1986 (age 39–40)
- Education: University of Birmingham
- Occupation: Television sports journalist
- Known for: presenter on the Sky Sports television show Good Morning Sports Fans
- Spouse: Zeb Wayne
- Relatives: Jeff Wayne (father-in-law)

Olivia Wayne (née Godfrey, born 1986) is a British sports journalist, and co-presenter on the Sky Sports television show Good Morning Sports Fans.

== Early life ==
She grew up in Mill Hill, London, the daughter of Jewish parents. She was educated at North London Collegiate School and earned a degree in American and Canadian studies from the University of Birmingham.

== Career ==
She is a presenter on the Sky Sports television show Good Morning Sports Fans.

== Personal life ==
Wayne is married to DJ and producer Zeb Wayne, the son of composer and musician Jeff Wayne, best known for the musical War of the Worlds.
