= Needler's =

English confectionery company and brand

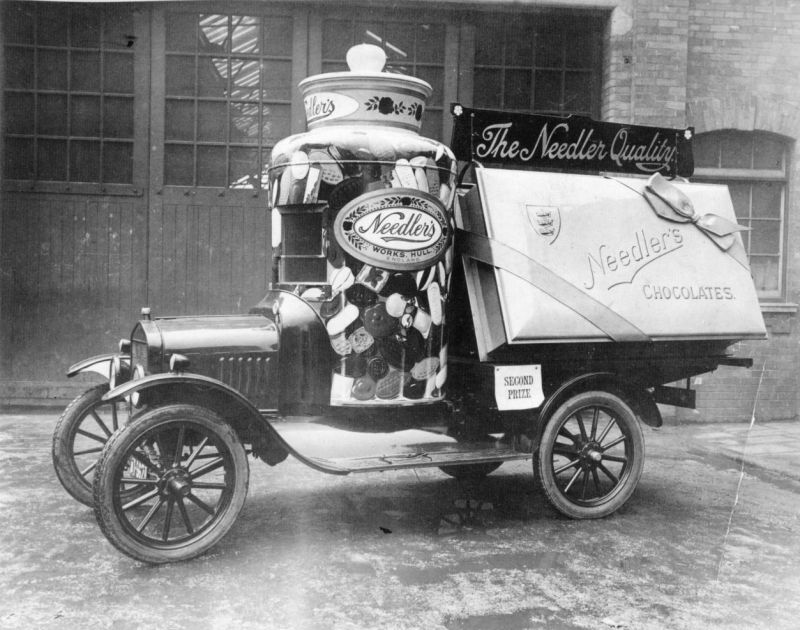
- Industry: Confectionery
- Founded: 1886 (approximately; purchase of predecessor company); 1902 (incorporated as Fred Needler Ltd.); 1906 (name changed to Needler Ltd.)
- Founder: Fred Needler
- Headquarters: Kingston upon Hull, England
- Website: ashbury.co.uk

Needler's was a sweet manufacturer based in Kingston upon Hull, England. The company was founded in the 19th century and sold to Hillsdown Holdings in 1986.

== History ==
Needler's owes its existence to Frederick Needler, who was born at Arnold, Skirlaugh, near Kingston upon Hull, England, on 12 December 1864. The family name appears to have been mis-spelt, as Frederick was the son of George Needley, a paint-factory employee, who died from typhoid in September 1872, age 37. Frederick attended St John's School, Newland, in Hull. His first job in about 1878, at age fourteen, was in a tea and coffee warehouse in High Street. In the 1881 Census, he is described as a grocer's apprentice. At age eighteen, he became a bookkeeper to Edward Buckton, who had a small manufacturing confectionery business near Paragon Station in Hull. In about 1886, using money from his mother, he bought this business for £100. He moved the premises to Anne Street, where he is known to have had two staff — a sugar boiler and a boy named Watson. They had a horse and cart for making deliveries.

There were many firms of this type in Hull at the time, usually operating within a geographical range determined by the stamina of their horses. Frederick Needler soon moved into wholesaling, occupying various premises to the north of Paragon Station until he bought 9 and 11 Spring Street in 1898, which is when company records started to be produced.

In 1899–1900 there was a turnover of about £15,000 and profit of £781 (about 5%). Production had reached about ten tons per week. There were ten female and twenty-three male employees producing over two hundred different products, chiefly boiled sweets and toffees. The company also acted as wholesalers for other brands, such as Cadburys, Frys and Rowntrees. In marketing terms, growth was greatly helped by the switch from green to clear glass jars, thereby improving the appearance.

The company was incorporated on 27 October 1902 as Fred Needler Ltd., when the directors were Fred Needler (at £250 per annum), Alfred Thorpe (£160), and Joseph Cooper Wilson (£140). There were 6,000 shares, of which 5,416 were owned by Frederick Needler, and 1 by his wife. The first minute books also date from this time.

In 1906 new larger premises were built on Bournemouth Street off Sculcoates Lane in Hull. The move was accompanied by a change in name to Needlers Ltd. An increasing demand for sweets led to a decline in the wholesale operation, which ceased by 1912. By this time the product range included 576 lines, including 74 in chocolate. A new chocolate plant began operations on the same site in August 1916. Turnover, which was £95,000 in 1913/14, peaked at £664,000 in 1920.

By the early 1920s average turnover was £570,000, representing 650 tons of chocolate and 1,500 tons of sweets, with a range now including Christmas boxes and Easter eggs. There were 1,700 employees, mainly female, with many more employed on a seasonal (especially pre-Christmas and pre-Easter) basis. However, although the company was large, it was not a truly national firm, and never had more than about one per cent of the market. In 1927, the factory packing areas were air-conditioned, enabling sweet packing to continue in all weathers. Sweet wrappers were introduced in the early 1920s, but this process was undertaken by hand until the first wrapping machines were introduced in 1928. 1,500 people were employed in 1929.

Until 1918 goods were delivered locally by horse and cart or van, and nationally by rail. Increased volume necessitated a fleet of delivery vans working from Hull, and from rail depots in London, Manchester, Nottingham and Grimsby. There were forty vehicles by 1927, each with a chocolate-brown livery for advertising purposes. In 1950, rail distribution was abandoned in favour of road following the decision by British Railways to move into lump shunting (which resulted in large-scale breakages of chocolates). In 1965 there were still fifty vans and drivers.

Needlers was badly hit by the depression, the worst year being 1931 when turnover was £328,000 and profits just £5,000. This coincided with Frederick Needler's deterioration in health with Parkinson's disease, from which he died on 30 September 1932, age 67, leaving £147,956. He had become well known as a strong supporter of the Liberal cause, and as a local benefactor — including the gift of a house in Cottingham to be used as a student hall of residence (Needler Hall) for the newly established Hull University College. He was succeeded as managing director by his son Percival.

In 1938, the company's chemists found a way of producing clear or Glace fruit drops — an area in which the company was to have little or no competition until the mid-1960s. Consequently, the emphasis of production shifted away from chocolate (where Cadburys, Rowntrees and Mars dominated) towards sweets. Sweets (and their raw materials) were rationed between 1941 and February 1953. Thereafter, demand — particularly for Glace fruit drops — shot up.

In 1958 Needlers became a publicly quoted company, although the Needler family retained a controlling interest. Percival Needler retired in 1970, age 70, and was succeeded by his son Raymond as managing director. He immediately bought the London-based toffee manufacturers Batgers, known for their "Jersey" brand, and for producing Sainsbury's own brands. In 1980, Dickson Orde and Co., a small confectionery manufacturer based at Farnham in Surrey, was purchased. In the early 1980s export markets (particularly the United States and the Middle East) were opened up for the first time.

The company was well known for its fair treatment of employees. Profit sharing was introduced as early as 1911, there were good social and sports facilities and a mixed-voiced choir, Needlers Music Society, was established in 1925.

== Sale of company; post-sale activity ==
In 1986, the company was bought by Hillsdown Holdings. Raymond Needler retired in 1987. In 1996, Needler's was sold by its owner, the Norwegian company Nidar, to Blue Bird Confectionery, a subsidiary of Singapore-based Jack Chia-MPH. The company was renamed 'Needler Blue Bird Confectionery' in 2000. In 2001 Jack Chia-MPH entered into negotiations to sell the subsidiary, and the sale of Needler Blue Bird to Ashbury Confectionery was completed in 2002. The factory in Sculcoates, Hull was subsequently closed, the site of the factory was redeveloped as a housing estate, 'Needler's Way'.

== Products ==
- Needlers Blended Chocolate:Blended Chocolate bar
- Needlers Coffee Milk Chocolate bar
  - Needlers Coffee Chocolate bar
- Needlers Krems Orange:Milk Chocolate bar
- Needlers Krema Grapefruit:Milk Chocolate bar
- Needlers Lime Milk Chocolate bar
- Needlers Milk Chocolate bar
- Needlers My Alphabet
- Needlers Orange Milk Chocolate bar
- Needlers Pop Choc - Krispie
- Needlers Pop Choc - Milk Chocolate
- Needlers Pop Choc - Orange
- Needlers Sultana Milk Chocolate bar
- Needlers Hazelnut Milk Chocolate bar
- Needlers Mint Crisp bar
- Needlers Krispie Milk Chocolate bar
