= Blue Bird Toffee =

British brand

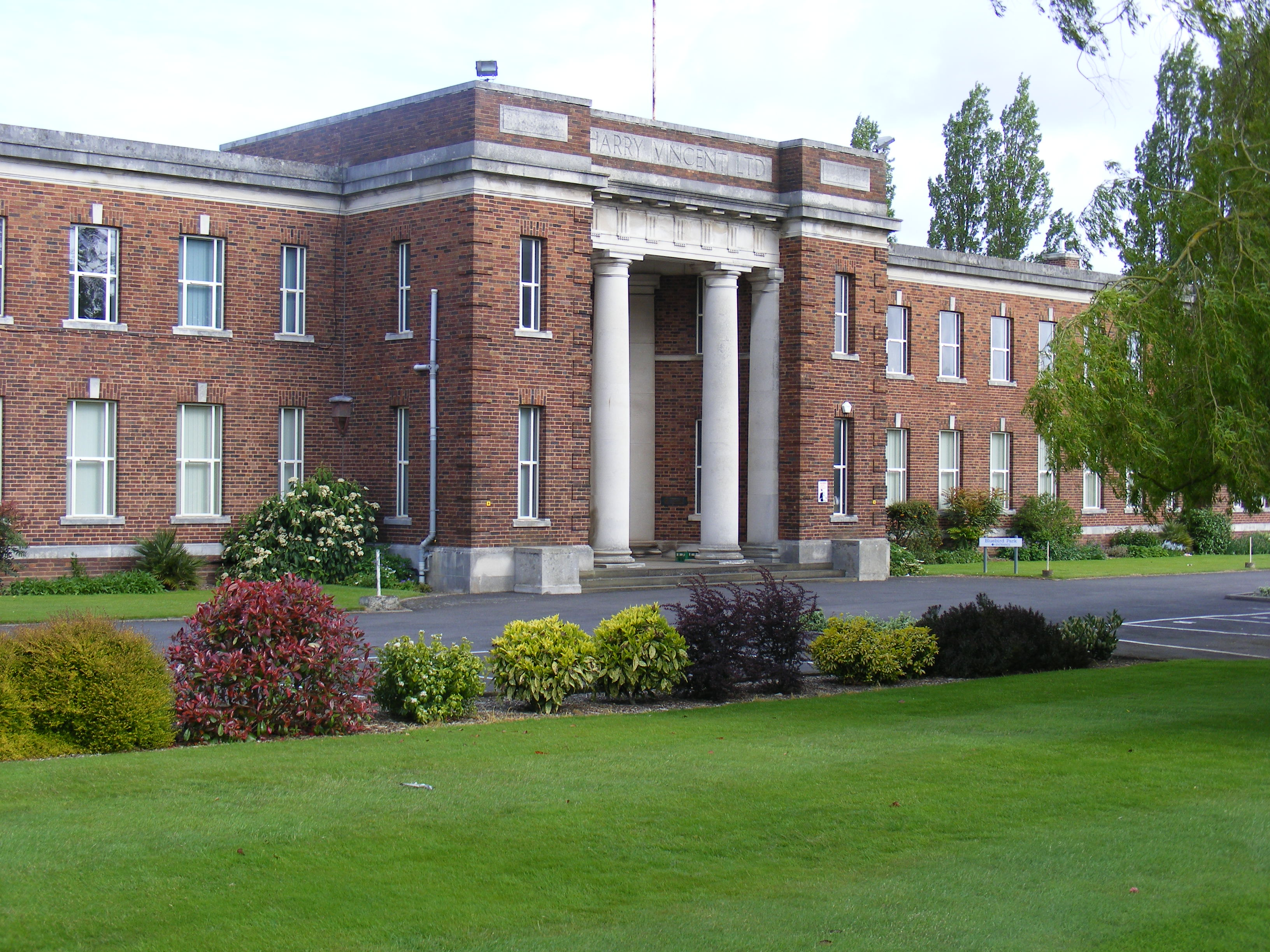
The former Blue Bird Toffee factory in Hunnington, Worcestershire

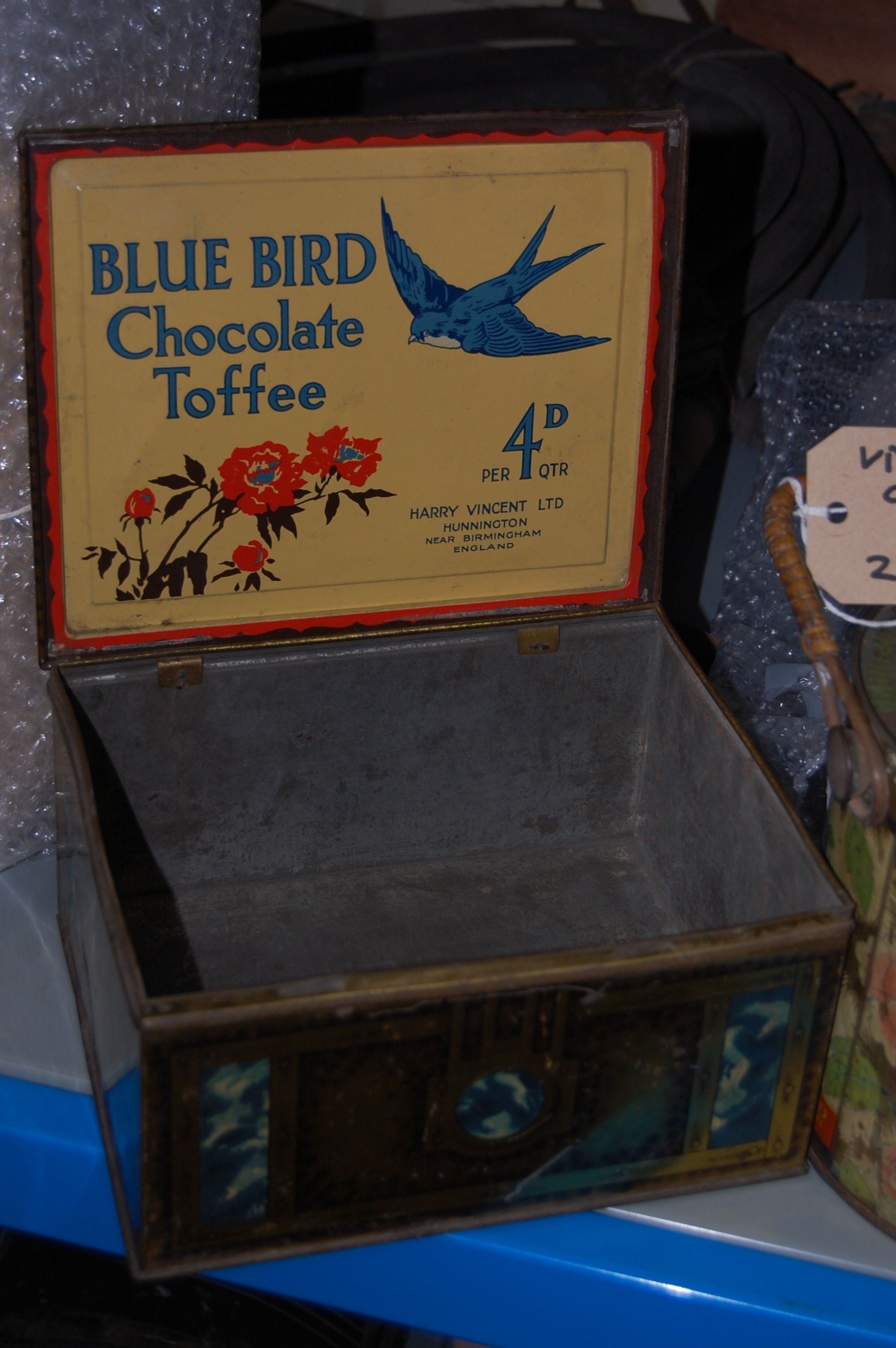
Blue Bird Chocolate Toffee tin in the collection of the Black Country Living Museum

Blue Bird Toffee was a brand of toffee, founded in Hunnington, near Birmingham, England, in 1898 by Harry Vincent.

Vincent had similar ideas to Cadbury and the Frys with regards to the workplace being a pleasant environment to work.

Vincent's toffee was originally called Harvino, but after watching Maeterlink's play 'The Blue Bird of Happiness' he renamed the product Blue Bird.

Blue Bird Toffee left their West Midlands site in October 1998, and the company then traded in Hull as part of Needler's. In December 2021, permission was granted for the part demolition of the former Midlands site and conversion of the remainder Grade II listed building into apartments. The rest of the site will be used for housing.

Needler's changed its name after acquiring Blue Bird to become Needler Bluebird. In 2002 Needler Bluebird was purchased by Ashbury Confectionery and discontinued all lines previously made by Needler's and Blue Bird.

Ashbury donated the company's collection of historic Blue Bird packaging to the Black Country Living Museum.
