= Museum of Brands =

Museum in London, England

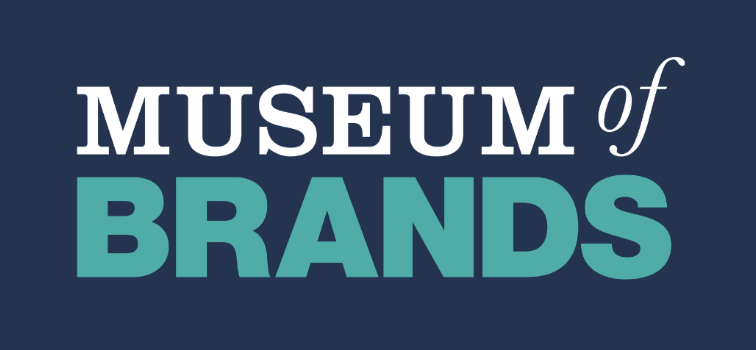

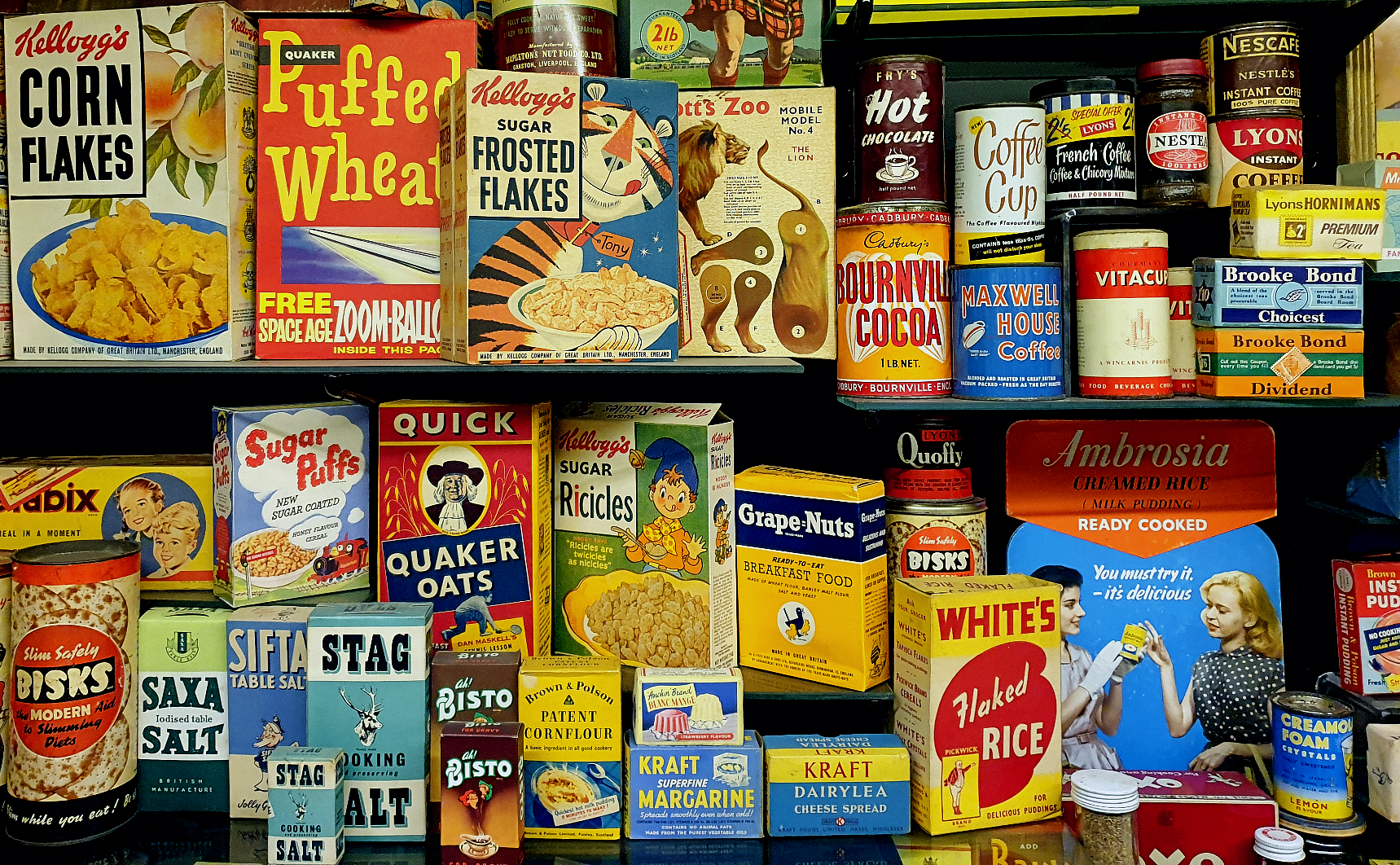
- 1950s packaging on display in the museum

- Location within Greater London
- Former name: Museum of Brands, Packaging and Advertising
- Established: 1984; 42 years ago
- Location: Notting Hill; London, W11; United Kingdom
- Coordinates: 51°30′59″N 0°12′40″W
- Type: Art museum
- Collection size: 15,000
- Founder: Robert Opie
- Public transit access: Ladbroke Grove
- Website: https://www.museumofbrands.com

The Museum of Brands is a museum in London that focuses on the history of consumer culture from Victorian times to the present day. The museum was set up as a registered charity in 2002, and is located at 111–117 Lancaster Rd., Notting Hill, London W11 1QT.

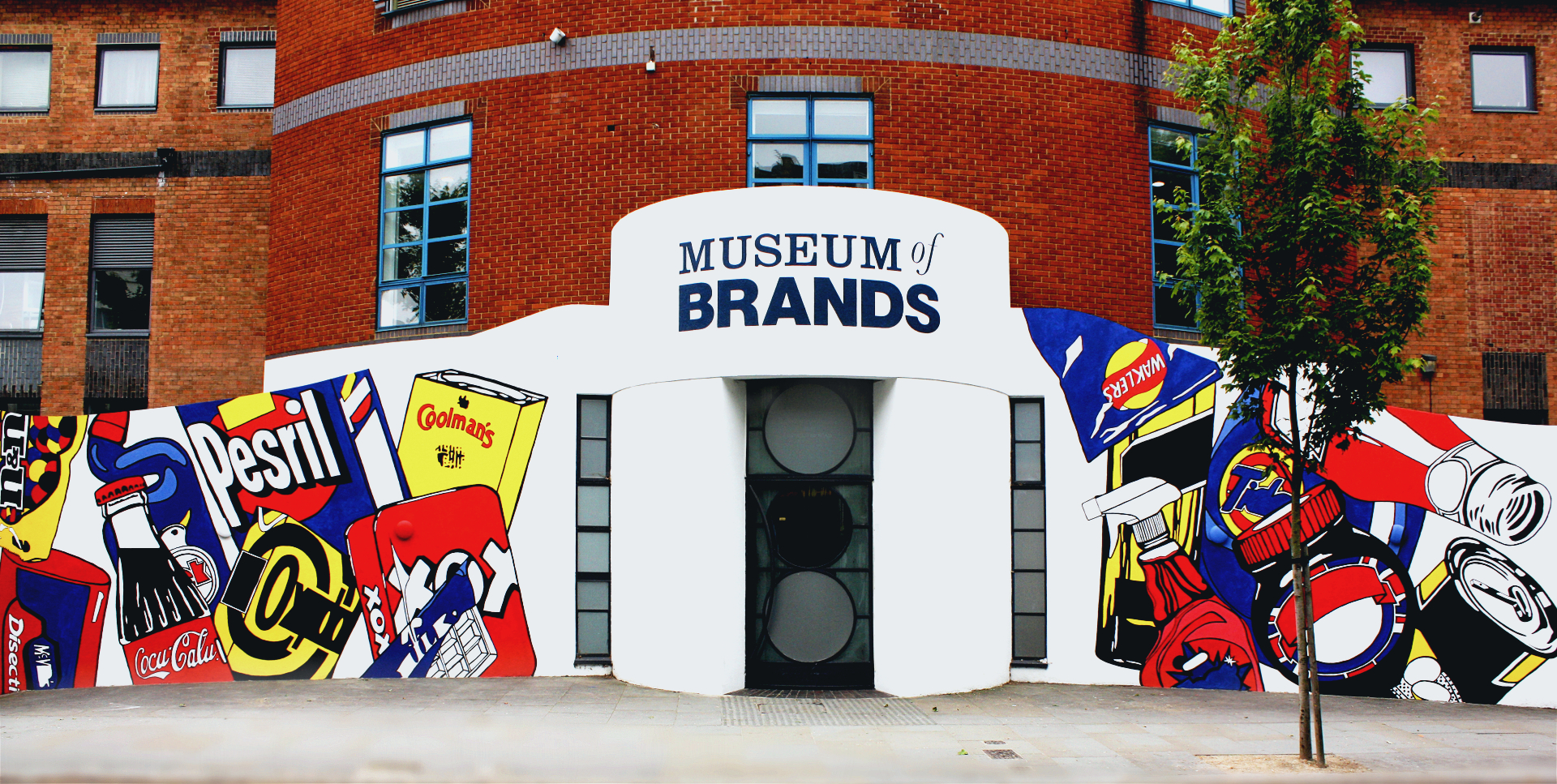
Exterior of the museum

== History ==
The museum showcases over 12,000 items from the Robert Opie Collection which were housed in the Museum of Advertising and Packaging at Gloucester Docks from 1984 until its closure in October 2001. The collection moved to Notting Hill in 2005. Another display of the Robert Opie Collection at Opie's Museum of Memories formed part of the now-defunct Wigan Pier Experience. The museum receives over 40,000 visitors annually. The museum does not allow access (beyond what is on display to the public) to their collections for academic research.

== Collection ==
The museum features over 12,000 original items including domestic "everyday" products, packaging, posters, toys and games.

Throughout the year, the museum presents temporary exhibitions, talks and workshops. In 2020, the Museum opened "When Brands Take a Stand", an exhibition on the topic of brands' dealings with social issues.

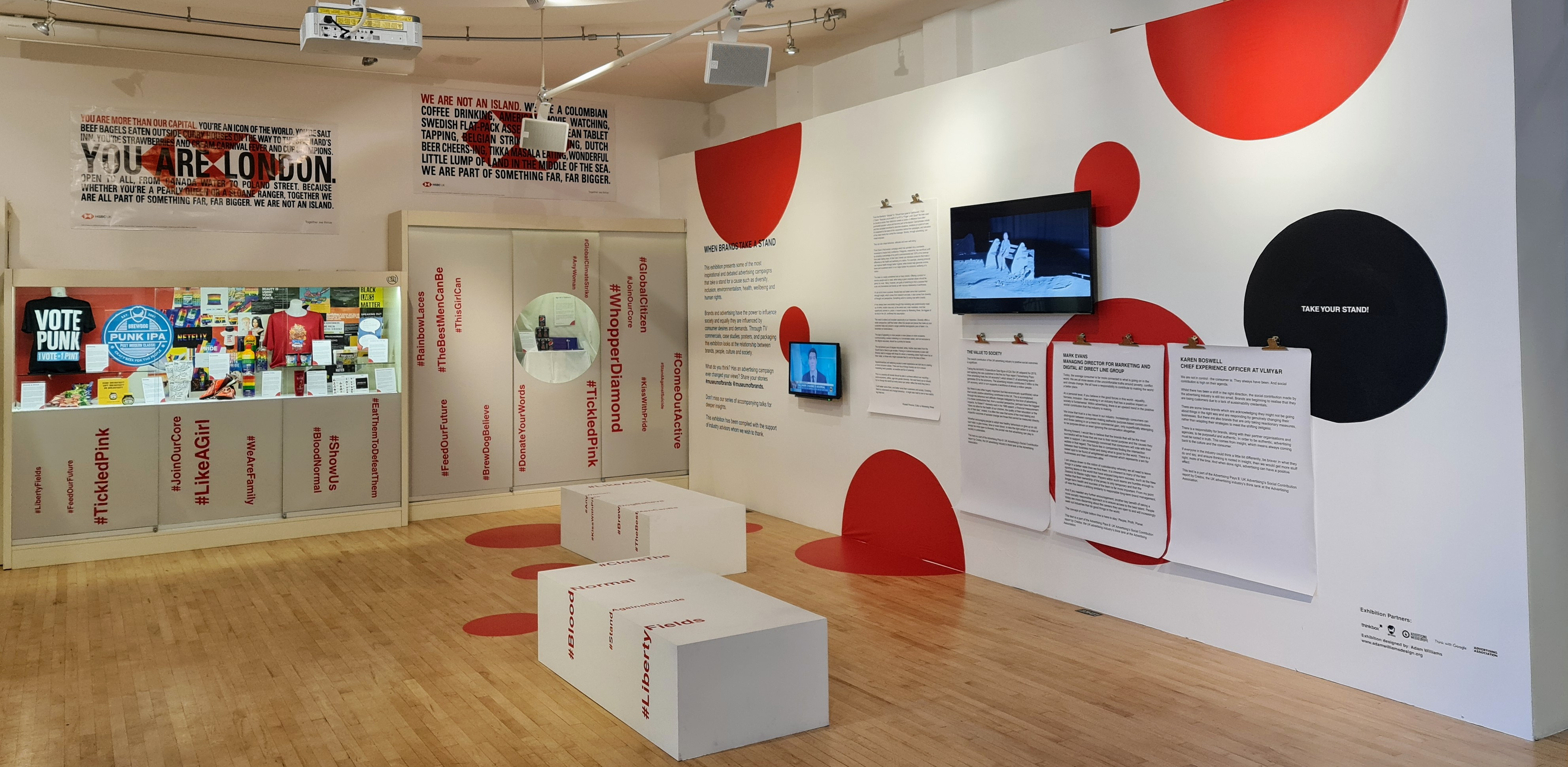
Temporary exhibitions at the Museum of Brands

== Facilities ==
The museum has a café and a garden area. It is also available as a venue for receptions and parties, and it has a separate conference space and boardroom for meetings.

Since originally opening in Colville Mews in 2005, the museum's visitor numbers have increased fourfold; it later reopened in September 2015 at the London Lighthouse Building in Lancaster Road, formerly owned by the Terrence Higgins Trust.

== Sponsors ==
The museum has had help from different sponsors. Its founding sponsors include DS Smith, Diageo, Kellogg's, Cadbury, Twinings, Vodafone, McVitie's and PI Global.

In 2015, the World Branding Forum sponsored the education programme of the museum. In 2014, the museum had over 10,000 students attending sessions.

== See also ==
- Land of Lost Content (museum)
- List of museums in London
