= World Banana Forum =

- Formation: 2009
- Type: Multi-stakeholder forum
- Headquarters: Rome, Italy
- Website: www.fao.org/wbf

The World Banana Forum (WBF) is a permanent space of assembly for participants representing the global banana supply-chain to promote an open dialogue on the challenges faced by the banana industry. The secretariat of the WBF is provided by the Food and Agriculture Organization of the United Nations (FAO).

== History ==
The World Banana Forum (WBF) was launched at a conference organized by the Food and Agriculture Organization of the United Nations (FAO) in Rome in 2009 with the participation of some 150 stakeholders from the whole banana sector worldwide. They have formed three specialized working groups (WG) to implement practical activities which address the most urgent environmental, social and economic challenges: WG01 on Sustainable Production Systems and Environmental Impact, WG02 on Distribution of Value and WG03 on Labour Rights.
