= Moody McCarthy =

American stand-up comedian (born 1967)

- Born: Matthew Patrick McCarthy; January 23, 1967 (age 59); Syracuse, New York, U.S.

Comedy career
- Years active: 1992 – present
- Medium: Stand-up
- Genre: Observational comedy
- Website: moodymccarthy.com

Matthew Patrick "Moody" McCarthy (born 1967) is an American stand-up comedian who has made multiple network TV appearances. McCarthy was raised in Syracuse, New York, the sixth of seven children, and graduated from Corcoran High School in 1984, before attending New York University.

McCarthy married Molly Mandell in 2012.
