= Halesowen Railway =

Railway in England

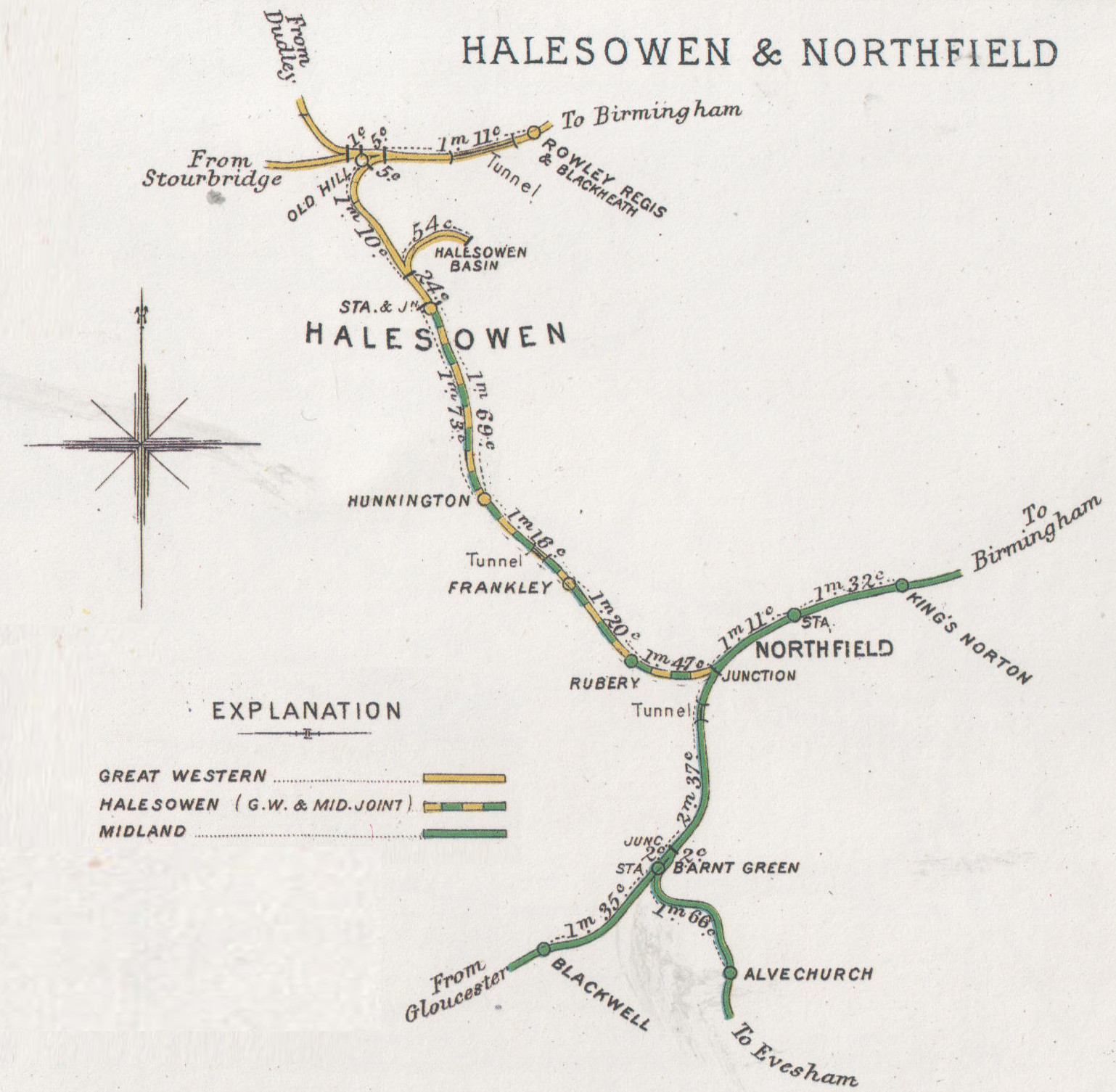
A 1903 Railway Clearing House map of the Halesowen Joint Railway (shown in green and yellow) and connecting lines

The Halesowen Railway, also known as the Halesowen and Northfield Railway and the Halesowen Joint Railway, was a standard gauge railway in what is now the West Midlands of England. It connected the Great Western Railway's branch from Old Hill to Halesowen (opened 1878) with the Midland Railway’s Birmingham to Gloucester line at Longbridge Junction (formerly known as Halesowen Junction) near the present Longbridge station. The term "Halesowen Railway" is sometimes applied to the whole line between Old Hill and Longbridge but, strictly, it applies only to the portion south of Halesowen.

== Opening ==
The Great Western Railway (GWR) opened their branch from Old Hill (on the line between Stourbridge Junction and Birmingham Snow Hill) to Halesowen on 1 March 1878. The new branch was 1 mile 43 chains (2.5 km) long from the junction at Old Hill. (On the same day, the GWR opened the 2-mile-65-chain (4.5 km) link between Old Hill and Netherton on the line from Stourbridge Junction to Wolverhampton Low Level). Construction of the line between Halesowen and Northfield started in 1878 and the railway opened as the Halesowen and Northfield Railway on 10 September 1883.

Halesowen and Bromsgrove Branch Railways Act 1865
- Act of Parliament
- Parliament of the United Kingdom
- Long title: An Act to incorporate a Company for making Railways in the County of Worcester, to be called the Halesowen and Bromsgrove Branch Railways; and for other Purposes.
- Citation: 28 & 29 Vict. c. ccxxxiii

Dates
- Royal assent: 5 July 1865

Text of statute as originally enacted

The Halesowen and Bromsgrove Branch Railways was formed by the Halesowen and Bromsgrove Branch Railways Act 1865 (28 & 29 Vict. c. ccxxxiii), and authorised to make a railway from the Midland Railway's Birmingham and Gloucester line at Old Hill, to the Netherton and Halesowen branch of the West Midland Railway (merged into the Great Western Railway in 1863). The Halesowen and Bromsgrove Branch Railways Company was an independent company.

Halesowen Railway Act 1876
- Act of Parliament
- Parliament of the United Kingdom
- Long title: An Act to confer further powers on the Halesowen and Bromsgrove Branch Railways Company; and for other purposes.
- Citation: 39 & 40 Vict. c. cxxxi

Dates
- Royal assent: 13 July 1876

Text of statute as originally enacted

By the Halesowen Railway Act 1876 (39 & 40 Vict. c. cxxxi), the Halesowen and Bromsgrove Branch Railways were renamed the Halesowen Railway.

By the Midland Railway Act 1906 (6 Edw. 7. c. lxxix) it became the Halesowen Joint Railway – a joint operation between the Great Western and Midland Railways. It became jointly owned by the GWR and the London, Midland and Scottish Railway in 1923 and British Railways in 1948.

== Closure ==
The line had a relatively short passenger railway life; the stations on the line between Rubery and Halesowen being closed to passengers in 1919 when the Midland Railway withdrew all its scheduled passenger services between Halesowen and Longbridge, although scheduled Great Western Railway services between Old Hill and Halesowen lingered on until the 5 December 1927 when they too, were withdrawn.

However, the line and the stations officially closed to passengers remained open for freight services and unadvertised workers' special trains to the Austin Rover Works that ran to/from Old Hill and Halesowen to/from Longbridge station, which was then sited adjacent to the Austin works on the Halesowen branch just beyond Halesowen Junction on the former MR line to Bromsgrove. The last of these workers specials to Halesowen and Old Hill was the 17:40 service that departed from Longbridge station on the 29 August 1958: however, workers special services continued to run from Birmingham New Street station to Longbridge station until the 1 January 1960.

Two sections of the Halesowen Railway closed completely during 1964: the Halesowen to Rubery section closed on the 6 January 1964, whilst the section between Rubery and Longbridge station remained open to serve a nearby stone quarry, until it too, closed on the 6 July of that year. The section between Old Hill and Halesowen Basin GWR goods depot remained open for goods services to the Halesowen canal-rail interchange basin and goods depot until the 1 October 1969. After that date, only a short section of the line from Halesowen Junction as far north as Frankley remained in regular use as 1) a means of transporting materials in and finished goods out of the Austin Rover works, using the national rail network via Halesowen Junction and 2) as a headshunt for the Austin works internal railway network that extended in a northerly direction as far as Frankley. The internal rail network was later extended to serve the-then new Austin Metro plant sited on the north-western side of the A38 Bristol Road: work on which commenced in 1975.

The short section of the former Halesowen Railway from the Longbridge motor plant internal railway system to the national rail network at Halesowen Junction on the former MR main line between Birmingham and Bristol, remained in use until 2005 when the motor works closed and this remaining section of the line from the Austin works internal rail system to Halesowen Junction was lifted as part of the clearance and redevelopment of the Longbridge site.

Hunnington station was converted into a private house after the station officially closed and the other intermediate stations at Coombes Holloway and Rubery were demolished; however, the original Longbridge station booking office building sited on the Bristol Road survived more or less intact until around 2012; when, despite local efforts to preserve it, the building was demolished, along with what else remained of the station.

The impressive lattice viaduct that spanned Dowery Dell, south of Hunnington station, was dismantled in April 1965.

The Campaign for Better Transport has added the railway to its recommendations for reopening.

== Structures ==
A significant structure on the line was the Dowery Dell Viaduct, between Halesowen and Rubery. It was dismantled in 1964.

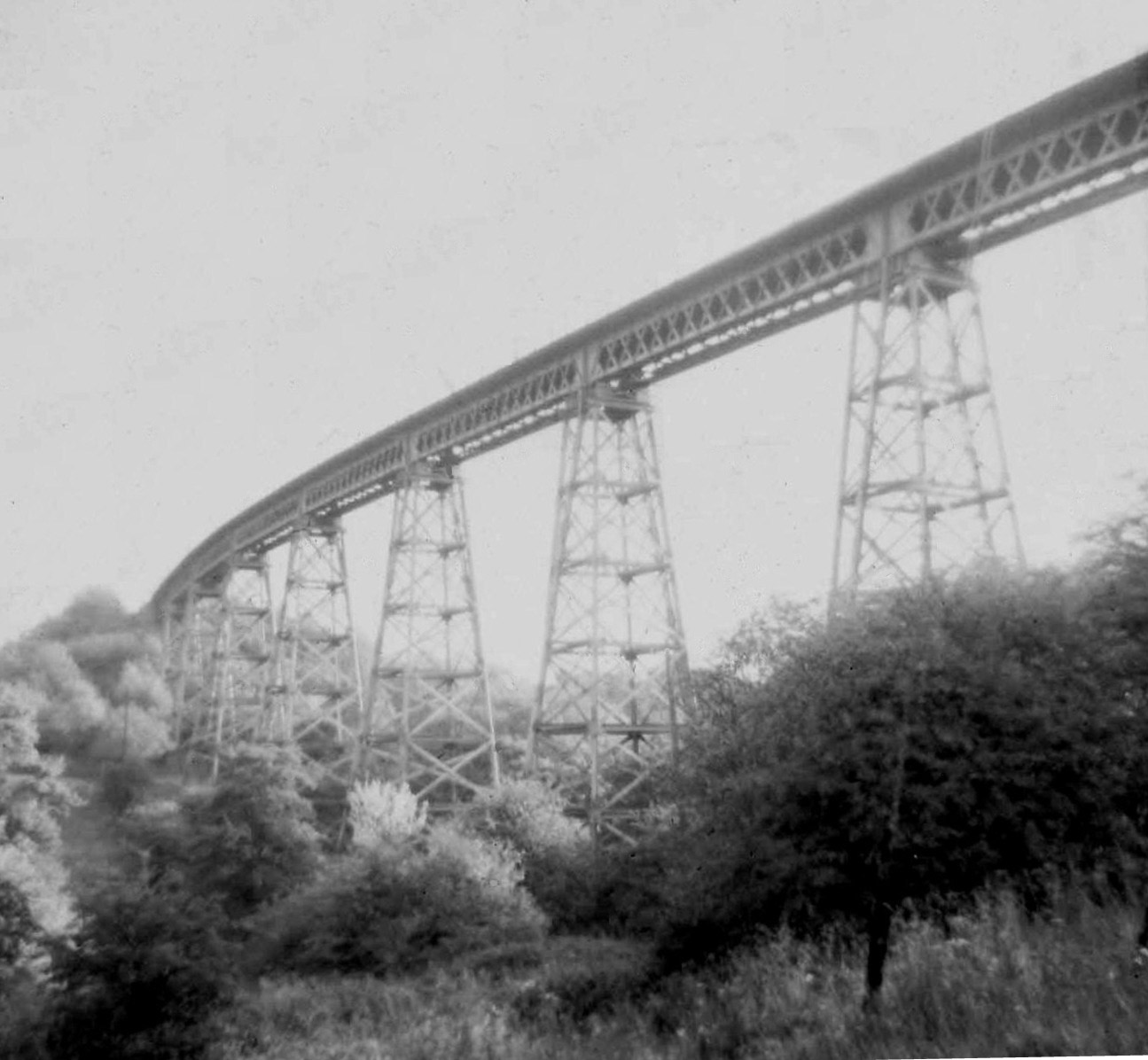
Dowery Dell Viaduct in 1958

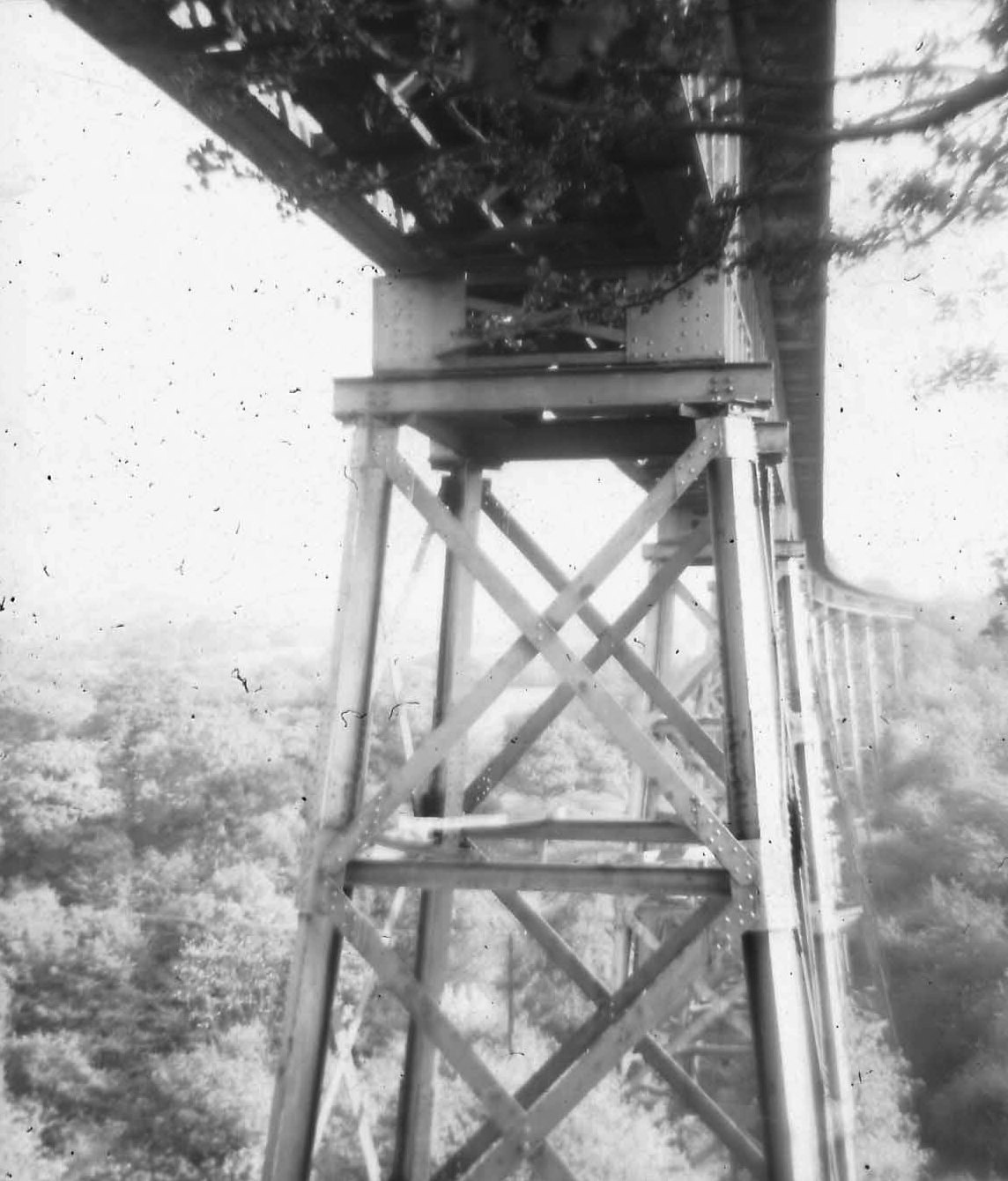
Dowery Dell Viaduct showing one pier in 1958

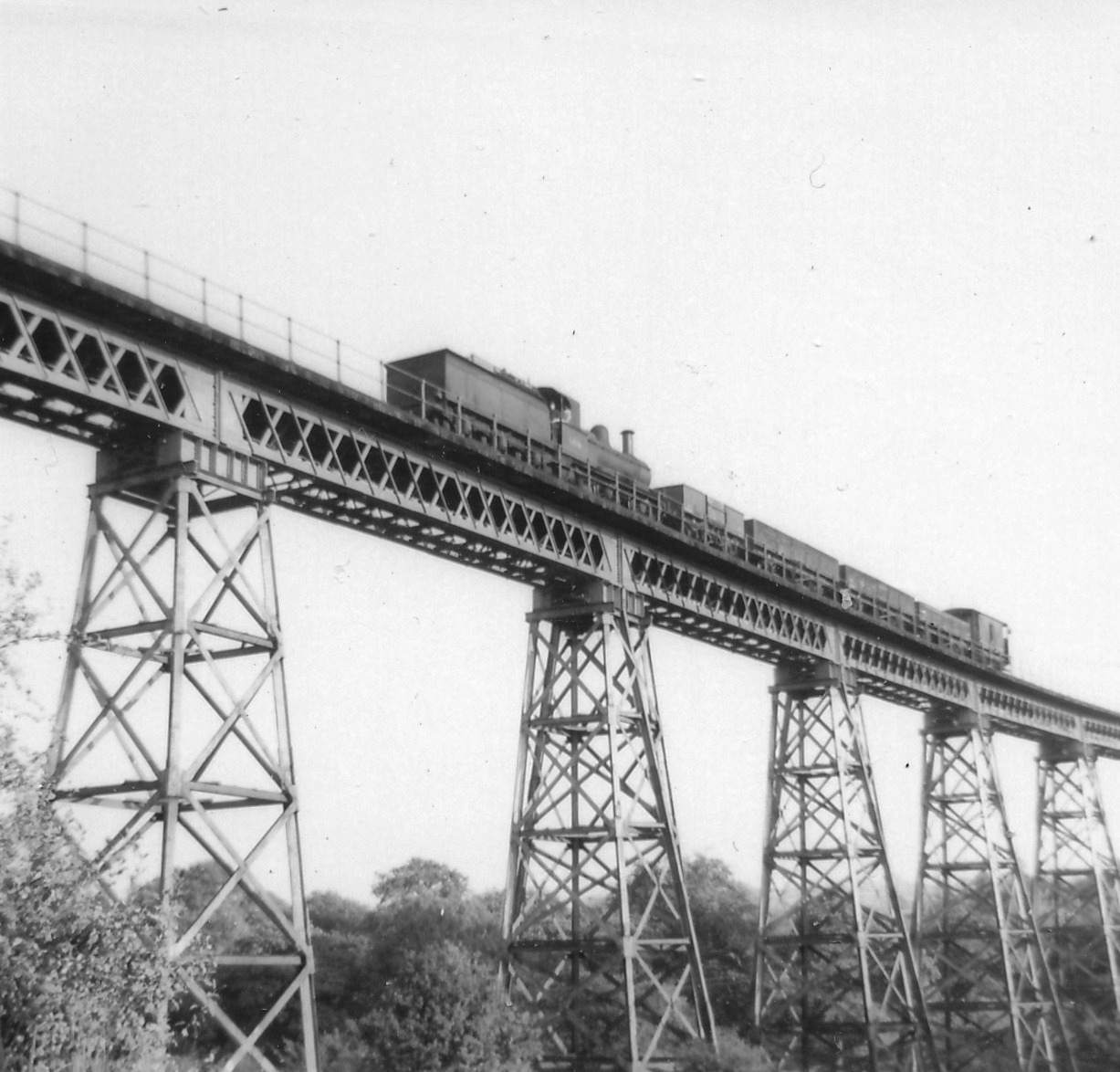
Dowery Dell Viaduct with steam train passing towards Longbridge in 1958
