= Lifford (disambiguation) =

Lifford is a town in County Donegal, Ireland.

Lifford may also refer to:

== Places ==
=== Canada ===
- Lifford, Ontario, a community of Manvers Township

=== United Kingdom ===
- Lifford, Birmingham, an area of the city
  - Lifford railway station, a former station
- Lifford, County Tyrone, a townland in Northern Ireland

== People ==
- Lifford (singer), stage name of Lifford Shillingford
- Tina Lifford (born 1954), American actress and playwright
- Troy Lifford, Canadian politician in New Brunswick
- Viscount Lifford, title in the peerage of Ireland

== See also ==
- Lifford (Parliament of Ireland constituency)
