= Kings Heath railway station =

Railway station in Birmingham, England

Kings Heath
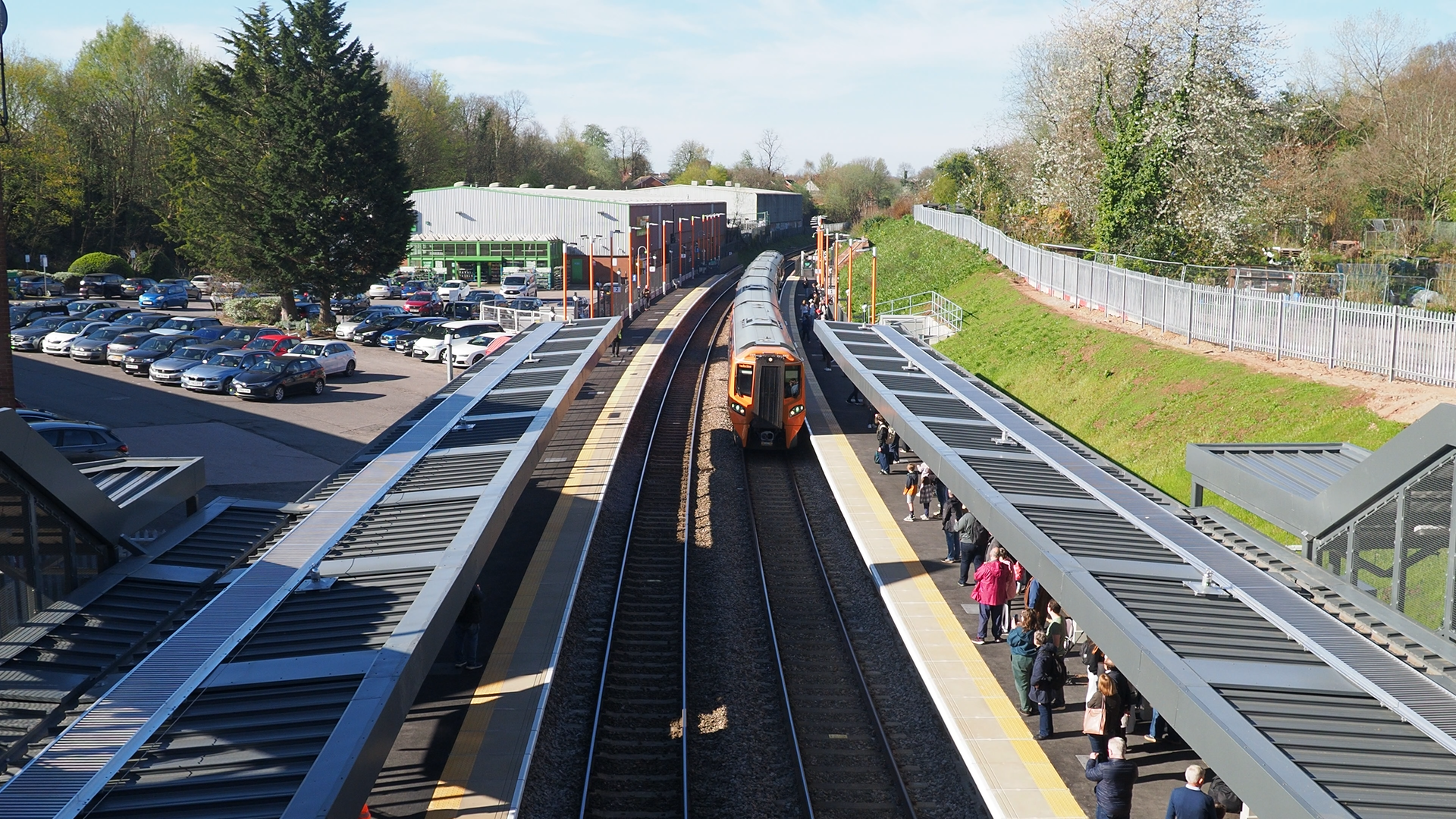
- Kings Heath pictured in 2026

General information
- Location: Kings Heath, Birmingham; England
- Coordinates: 52.4392°N 1.8930°W
- Grid reference: SP073823
- Manager: West Midlands Railway
- Transit authority: Transport for West Midlands
- Line: Camp Hill line
- Platforms: 2
- Train operators: West Midlands Railway

Other information
- Status: Open
- Station code: KIH
- Fare zone: TfWM Zone 3

History
- Original company: Birmingham and Gloucester Railway
- Pre-grouping: Midland Railway
- Post-grouping: London, Midland and Scottish Railway

Key dates
- 1840: Opened as Moseley
- 1 November 1867: Renamed Kings Heath
- 27 January 1941: Closed to passengers
- by 1970: Closed (goods station)
- 7 April 2026: Reopened
Location

Kings Heath railway station is a railway station in Kings Heath, Birmingham. It was originally opened in 1840 before being closed to passengers in 1941. It reopened on 7 April 2026.

== History ==
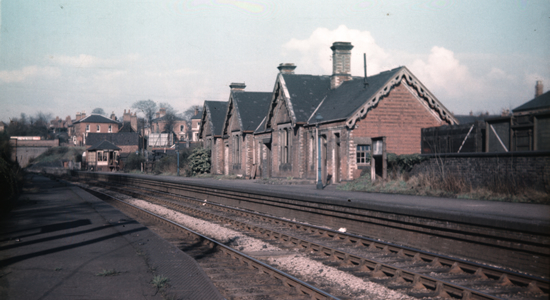
Kings Heath station buildings in 1956; site of the current station can be seen in the far left of the image

The station was built on the Birmingham and Gloucester Railway's mainline (now the Camp Hill line) on the border of Kings Heath and Moseley, adjacent to Highbury Park. Upon opening it was called Moseley station, however in 1867 the opening of a new upline station of the same name closer to the centre of Moseley caused the station to be renamed 'Kings Heath'.

The station finally closed to passengers on 27 January 1941 due to the Second World War, although it was used as a goods station and coal yard into the late 1960s. It was demolished at some point thereafter. The site of the goods facilities is now a small industrial estate and retail park.

== Reopening ==
Since the late 2000s, proposals have been made to re-open the station, along with others on the Camp Hill line, for passenger use.

In 2019, the project to re-open the stations at Moseley, Kings Heath, and Hazelwell received £15 million in Government funding, with construction due to start in 2020 and aimed for completion in time for the 2022 Commonwealth Games, though this was delayed by the coronavirus pandemic. In March 2021 it was announced that funding had been found for the project, with an opening date expected in 2023.

Construction work on the three new stations started in late 2022. Construction finished on the station in December 2025, and the station was handed to Transport for West Midlands (TfWM). There was then a period of driver training, testing and signalling work to ensure the stations are ready to open to passengers. All three stations reopened on 7 April 2026.

== Services ==
The basic Monday to Saturday off-peak service in trains per hour/day is as follows:

- 2 tph to Kings Norton
- 2 tph to Birmingham New Street

Other station facilities include step-free access to both platforms (via lifts), ticket machines, covered bike storage, covered seating and WiFi. The station is unstaffed and managed by West Midlands Railway.

Preceding station	National Rail	Following station
Pineapple Road	West Midlands Railway Camp Hill line	Moseley Village
	Disused railways	
Longbridge	Birmingham and Gloucester Railway	Camp Hill
Hazelwell	Midland Railway; Camp Hill line	Moseley
