= Kings Norton railway station =

Railway station in Birmingham, England

Kings Norton
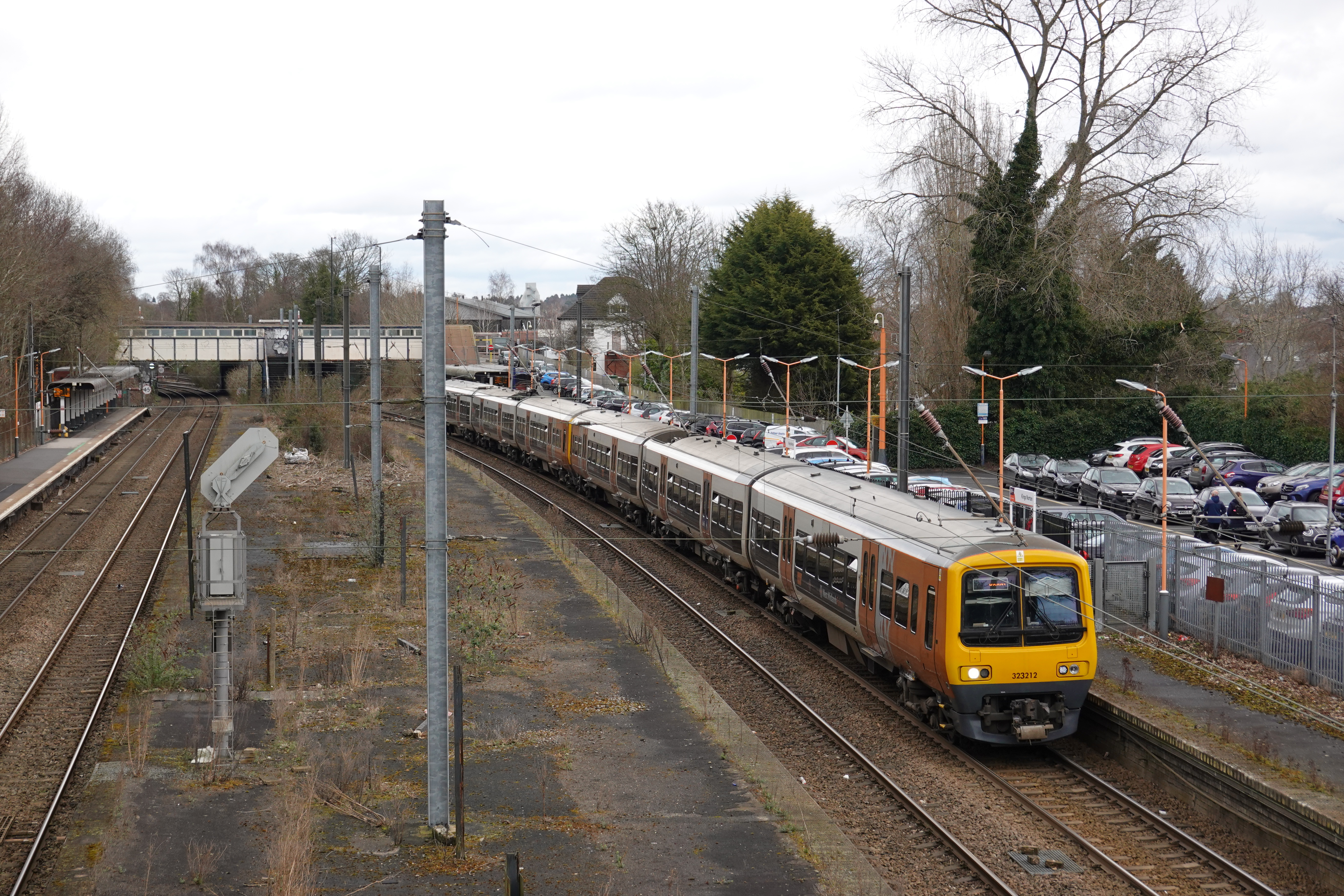
- Kings Norton railway station in 2023, only the two outer platforms are in use.

General information
- Location: Kings Norton, Birmingham; England
- Coordinates: 52.413°N 1.934°W
- Grid reference: SP046795
- Manager: West Midlands Railway
- Transit authority: Transport for West Midlands
- Platforms: 2

Other information
- Station code: KNN
- Fare zone: 3
- Classification: DfT category D

Key dates
- 1849: Opened
- 1978: Rebuilt
- 2006: Original building demolished

Passengers
- 2021/22: ▲0.537 million
- 2022/23: ▲0.676 million
- 2023/24: ▲0.835 million
- 2024/25: ▲0.934 million
- 2025/26: ▲1.060 million
Location
Notes
- Passenger statistics from the Office of Rail and Road

Kings Norton railway station serves the Kings Norton and Cotteridge areas of Birmingham, England. It lies on the Cross-City Line from Redditch and Bromsgrove via Birmingham New Street to Lichfield and is the terminus of the Camp Hill Line to New Street via Kings Heath. The station's main entrance is located on Pershore Road South, the A441.

== History ==
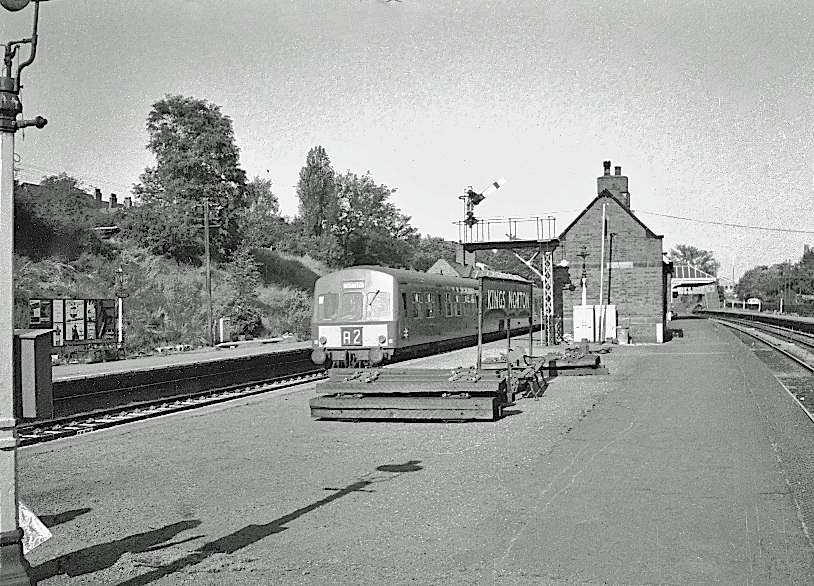
Kings Norton station in 1967

The current Kings Norton station is the second station to be built in the Kings Norton area. The original Lifford railway station (the first of three stations to bear the Lifford name) was the first. The station opened in 1849 as part of the Birmingham and Gloucester mainline to Birmingham Camp Hill terminus (later to Curzon Street).

In 1852 the stationmaster, Thomas Clark, was fined 50s (equivalent to £302 in 2025) for causing a collision. He allowed a goods-train on the line when an express train was due, and used defective signal lamps. The express train collided with the goods train and there was substantial damage, but no loss of life.

On 19 March 1864 at 6:00 pm, a luggage train with several trucks of sheep suffered a failed axle and all of the trucks behind were thrown off the line. Two of the trucks containing sheep descended the embankment and overturned, killing many of the sheep instantly. A fast train from Bristol was halted before it reached the collision site.

Upon the connection of the Birmingham West Suburban Railway (now part the Cross City line) to Birmingham New Street in 1885, this route became preferable to the original mainline (now the Camp Hill line) for Midland express routes. The platforms were extended in length in 1892 with the growth of the BWSR, enabling the construction of a large coal and goods yard with sidings for the adjacent Triplex factory. In the mid-1920s, two additional lines and platforms were added, opening to traffic on 14 March 1926. Stations on the Camp Hill line were closed to Passenger Traffic from January 1941, although passenger trains continue to use the line and stop at Kings Norton Station.

The station was rebuilt in 1978 by British Rail and the lines through the station were electrified in 1993.

Work on the reopening of the intermediate stations on the Camp Hill line began in autumn 2022, and the stations had been due to open by the December 2023 timetable change, with two services per hour along the line, giving Kings Norton six trains an hour to Birmingham New Street once again, a practice that was paused because of reduced Cross-City Line services following the coronavirus pandemic.

The reopening of the Camp Hill line has been hit by delays and the West Midlands Combined Authority had initially aimed to reopen the line for passenger use by the end of 2024. The line opened on 7 April 2026.

== Today ==
With the development of both bus and tram services, the need for such a large facility reduced from the 1930s onwards. The result is that today although all four platforms remain in place, only the outer two are in passenger use, with the middle island platforms now derelict.

Refurbished as part of the Cross-City line in 1978, it retained some of its original features following refurbishment, unlike the other 'cross city line' stations. The original station building survived, leased out for commercial purposes, until it was demolished in February 2006 for safety reasons. An extension car park provides a Park and Ride facility.

Kings Norton Station is equipped with real-time information departure boards which were installed in 2006 by Central Trains.

== Disabled access ==
There is step-free access to platform 1 (for trains towards Birmingham New Street) from the ticket office entrance. Step-free access to platform 4 (for trains towards Longbridge) is via the Pershore Road South road bridge and the car park.

== Services ==
The station is served by West Midlands Trains with local Transport for West Midlands branded "Cross-City" and Camp Hill Line services (of which the station is the southern terminus). The Cross-City line was operated using Class 323 Electric multiple units (EMUs) until September 2024 and currently by Class 730 EMUs, while Camp Hill Line services use Class 196 DMUs.

The off-peak service pattern is as follows:

Mondays to Saturdays:

- 4 trains per hour (tph) northbound to Four Oaks via University, Birmingham New Street and Sutton Coldfield, departing from Platform 1.
  - Of which:
    - 2 tph continue to Lichfield Trent Valley via Lichfield City, calling at all stations except Duddeston.
- 4 tph southbound to Longbridge, departing from Platform 4.
  - Of which:
    - 2 tph continue to Redditch via Alvechurch.
    - 2 tph continue to Bromsgrove, 1tph does not call at Barnt Green.
- 2 trains per hour (tph) northbound to Birmingham New Street via Kings Heath and Moseley, departing from Platform 1.

Sundays:

- 2 tph northbound to Lichfield Trent Valley.
- 2 tph southbound to Redditch.
- 1 tph northbound to Birmingham New Street (via University).
- 1 tph northbound to Birmingham New Street (via Kings Heath).
- 1 tph southbound to Bromsgrove.

Cross City Services on Sundays call at all stations between Lichfield T.V. and Redditch and all stations between Bromsgrove and Birmingham New Street.

Preceding station	National Rail	Following station
Bournville	West Midlands Railway Lichfield – Four Oaks – Birmingham – Bromsgrove/Redditch; Cross-City Line	Northfield
Terminus	West Midlands Railway Camp Hill line	Pineapple Road
	Disused railways	
Terminus	Midland Railway; Camp Hill line	Lifford

== Future ==
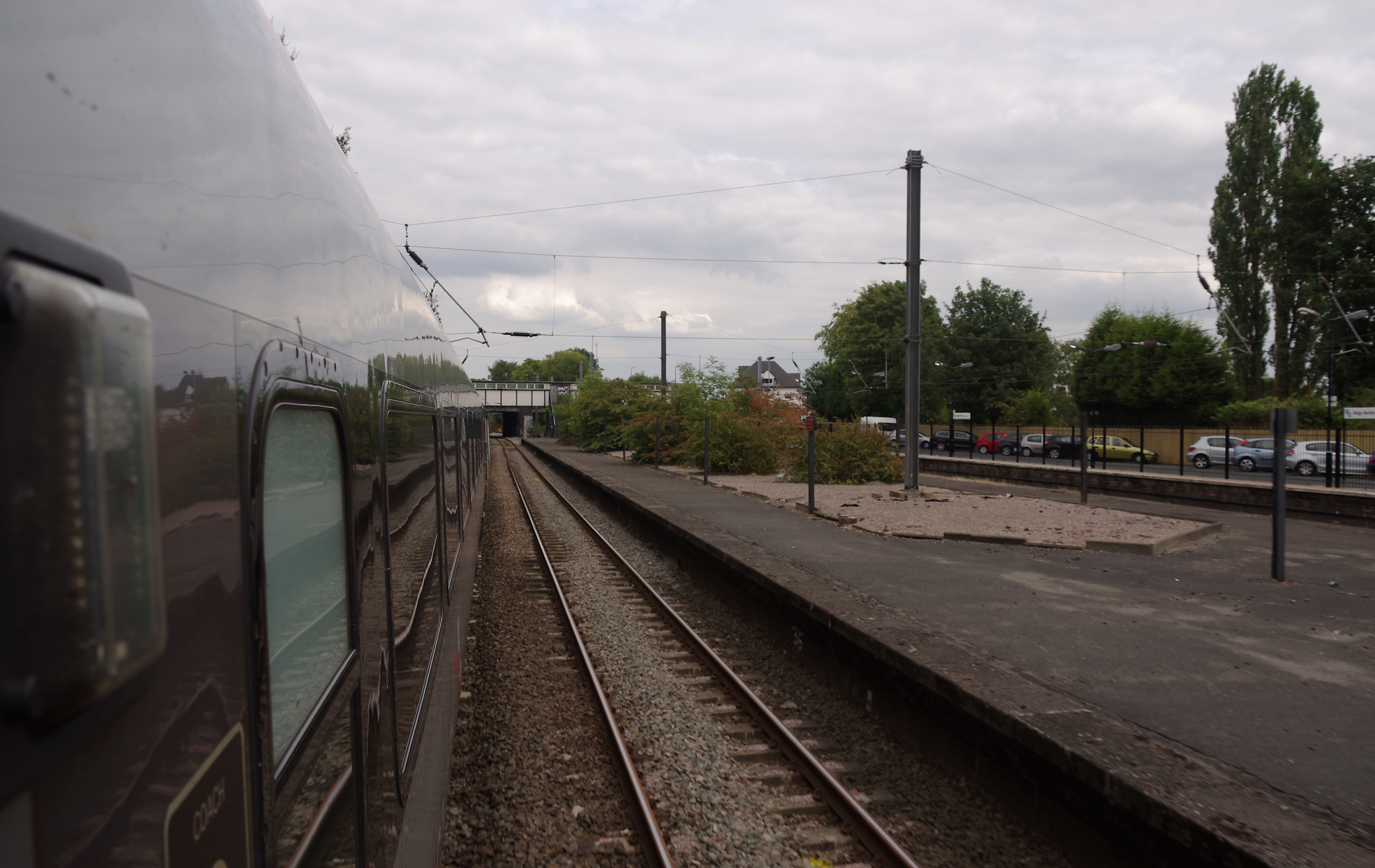
The island platforms at Kings Norton are disused, but could potentially be brought back into service.

Discussions are currently underway to electrify and re-open platform 2 for Cross City line services which would allow for six trains an hour to serve the Cross City line once again, as there is currently a track path clash between the Cross City and Camp Hill lines which prevents more than four local services an hour crossing the junction just before the station.

== In the media ==
Kings Norton Station has been used, along with many other areas of Birmingham, as a location in the BBC daily serial Doctors (for example in an episode first broadcast on 9 November 2011).
