= Moseley Village railway station =

Railway station in Birmingham, England

Moseley Village
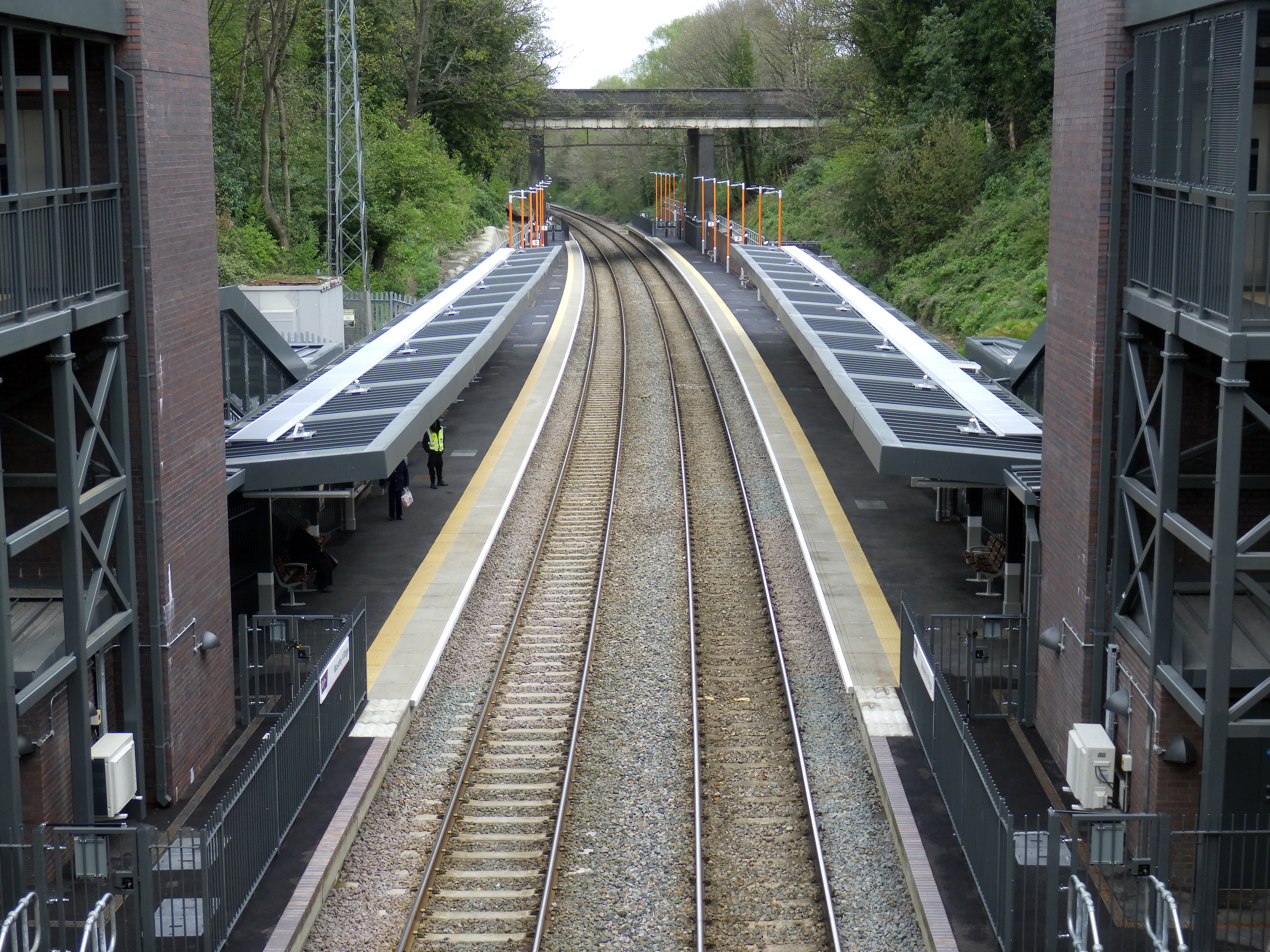
- Reopened station in 2026

General information
- Location: Moseley, Birmingham; England
- Coordinates: 52.4463°N 1.8856°W
- Grid reference: SP078831
- Managed by: West Midlands Railway
- Transit authority: Transport for West Midlands
- Line: Camp Hill line
- Platforms: 2
- Train operators: West Midlands Railway

Other information
- Status: Open
- Station code: MOV
- Fare zone: TfWM Zone 3

History
- Original company: Midland Railway
- Pre-grouping: Midland Railway
- Post-grouping: London Midland and Scottish Railway

Key dates
- 1 November 1867: Opened as Moseley
- 27 January 1941: Closed
- 7 April 2026: Reopened as Moseley Village
Location

Moseley Village railway station is a railway station in Moseley, Birmingham. It was first opened in 1867 and closed in 1941. It reopened on 7 April 2026.

== History ==
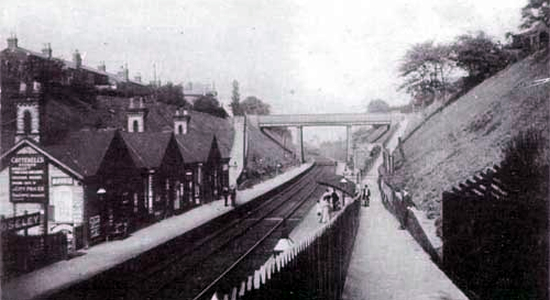
Moseley station and buildings in 1908

The station was opened by the Midland Railway on the former Birmingham and Gloucester Railway mainline (now the Camp Hill line) on 1 November 1867. Upon opening it was called Moseley, forcing an existing downline station of the same name to be renamed 'Kings Heath'. From 1923, the station was operated by the London Midland and Scottish Railway.

The station closed on 27 January 1941 as an economy measure during the Second World War. The buildings were demolished at some point thereafter.

== Reopening ==
In 2007 there were proposals to reopen the station and to resume local passenger services along the Camp Hill line, in which case the station would be served by trains between Birmingham Moor Street and Kings Norton railway station. In 2013 the proposal was shelved indefinitely.

In 2016, the newly created West Midlands Combined Authority revived the plans to restore local passenger services to the line, and declared it one of their priority transport schemes to be delivered by 2025. In 2019, the project to re-open the stations at Moseley, Kings Heath, and Hazelwell received £15 million in Government funding, with construction due to start in 2020 and aimed for completion in time for the 2022 Commonwealth Games. In March 2021 it was announced that funding had been found for the project. The station was named following a public vote to choose between 'Moseley' or 'Moseley Village'.

Construction on the station finished in December 2025, and it was handed to Transport for West Midlands (TfWM). Following this there was a period of driver training, testing and signalling work to ensure the stations are ready to open to passengers. All three stations reopened on 7 April 2026.

== Services ==
The basic Monday to Saturday off-peak service in trains per hour/day is as follows:

- 2 tph to Kings Norton
- 2 tph to Birmingham New Street

Other station facilities include, step-free access to both platforms (via lifts), ticket machines, covered bike storage, covered seating and WiFi. The station is unstaffed and managed by West Midlands Railway.

Preceding station	National Rail	Following station
Kings Heath	West Midlands Railway Camp Hill line	Birmingham New Street
	Disused railways	
Kings Heath	Midland Railway; Camp Hill line	Brighton Road
