= Pineapple Road railway station =

Railway station in England

Pineapple Road
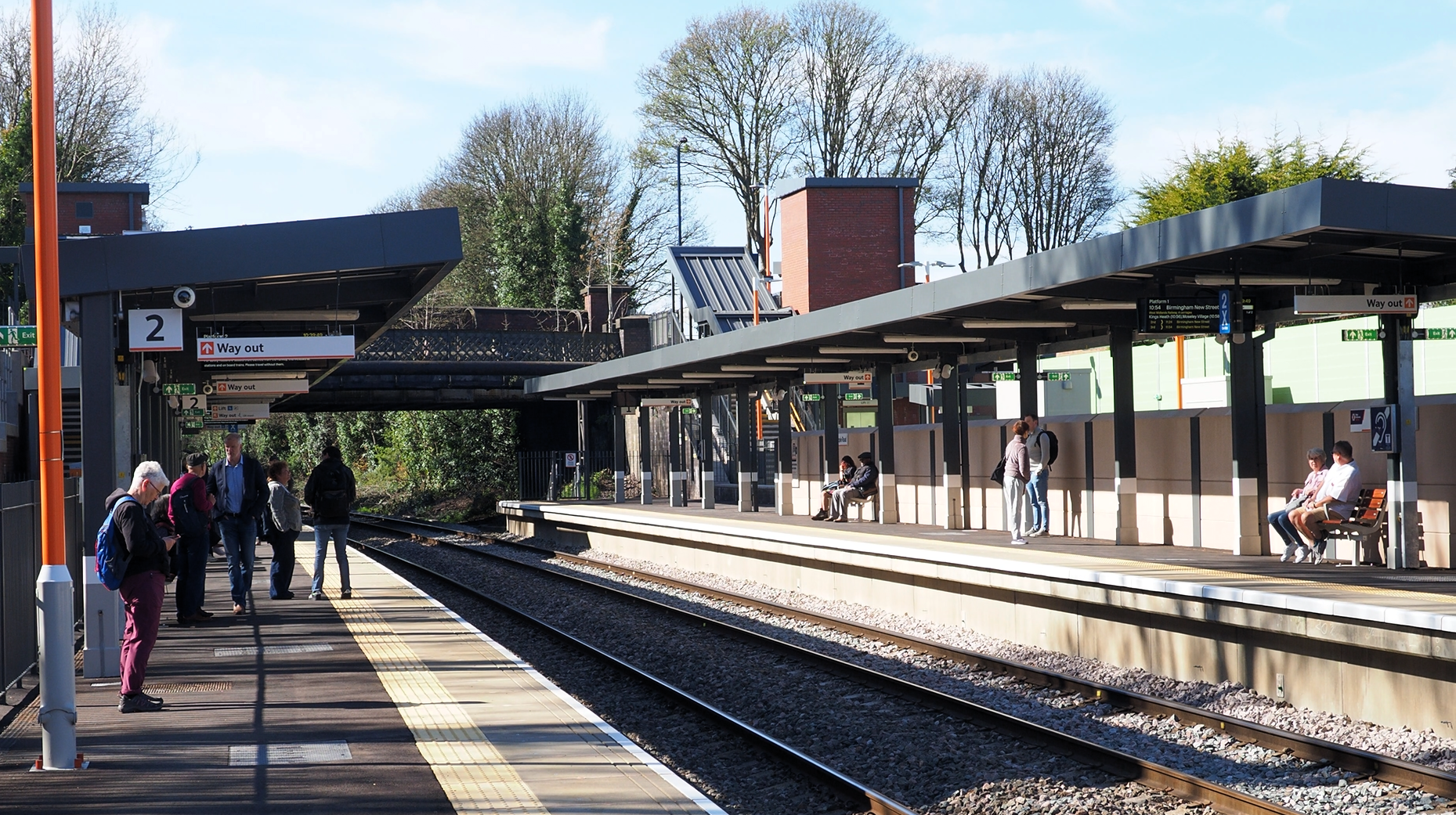
- Pineapple Road in 2026

General information
- Location: Stirchley, Birmingham; England
- Coordinates: 52.4299°N 1.9080°W
- Grid reference: SP063813
- Manager: West Midlands Railway
- Transit authority: Transport for West Midlands
- Line: Camp Hill line
- Platforms: 2
- Train operators: West Midlands Railway

Other information
- Status: Open
- Station code: PIR
- Fare zone: TfWM Zone 3

History
- Original company: Birmingham and Gloucester Railway
- Pre-grouping: Midland Railway
- Post-grouping: London, Midland and Scottish Railway

Key dates
- 1 January 1903: Opened as Hazelwell
- 27 January 1941: Closed
- 7 April 2026: Reopened as Pineapple Road
Location

Pineapple Road railway station is a railway station on the border of Kings Heath and Stirchley, Birmingham. It was first opened in 1903 and closed in 1941. It reopened on 7 April 2026.

== History ==
Construction of the new station started in 1902 on the former Birmingham and Gloucester Railway (B&GR) mainline (now the Camp Hill line) on the border of Hazelwell, Stirchley, and Kings Heath, situated between the existing Kings Heath and Lifford stations. The station cost £20,000 (equivalent to £2,102,500 in 2025) to build and was opened on 1 January 1903 as Hazelwell station. It was built to serve the Priory Estate which comprised 150 acres (61 ha).

Originally the station sat at a level crossing with a footbridge for pedestrians. In 1928, Herbert H. Humphries, Birmingham City Council City Engineer and Surveyor, invited tenders for the construction of the Cartland Road bridge over the railway at Hazelwell.

The station closed on 27 January 1941, when passenger services were withdrawn from the line due to "wartime economy measures", and was not reopened. The line remained open for freight and some longer distance passenger services.

The station buildings were the home of Birmingham Model Railway Club from 1963 until 1980.

== Reopening ==
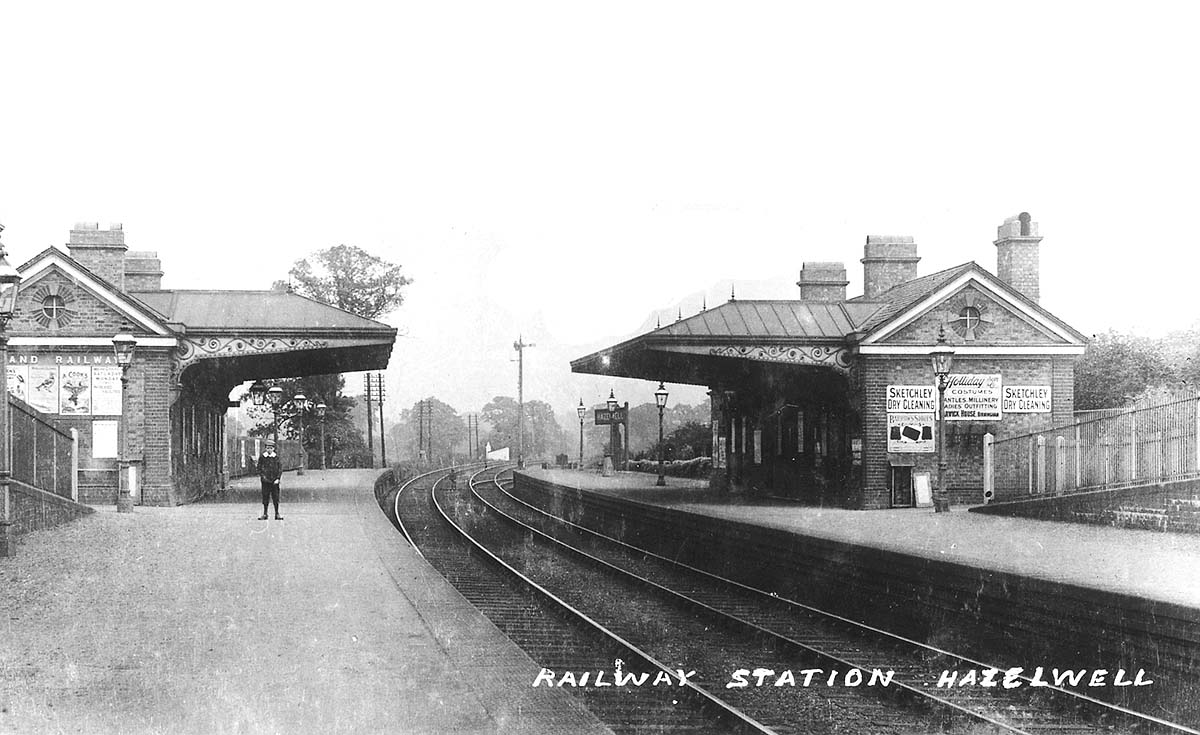
Hazelwell station buildings looking upline to Birmingham, viewed from below Cartland Road bridge c.1907

In 2019, the project to re-open the stations at Moseley, Kings Heath, and Hazelwell received £15 million in Government funding, with construction due to start in 2020 and aimed for completion in time for the 2022 Commonwealth Games. In March 2021 it was announced that funding had been found for the project. The station name was chosen by public vote from the three options of Pineapple Road, Stirchley and the historic Hazelwell.

The reopening of the Camp Hill line was hit by delays, and the West Midlands Combined Authority aimed to reopen the line for passenger use by the end of 2024. Construction finished on the stations in December 2025, and it was handed to Transport for West Midlands (TfWM). There was then a period of driver training, testing and signalling work to ensure the stations are ready to open to passengers. All three stations reopened on 7 April 2026.

== Services ==
The basic Monday to Saturday off-peak service in trains per hour/day is as follows:

- 2 tph to Kings Norton
- 2 tph to Birmingham New Street

Other station facilities include, step-free access to both platforms (via lifts), ticket machines, covered bike storage, covered seating and WiFi. The station is unstaffed and managed by West Midlands Railway.

Preceding station	National Rail	Following station
Kings Norton	West Midlands Railway Camp Hill line	Kings Heath
	Disused railways	
Lifford	Midland Railway; Camp Hill line	Kings Heath
