= Camp Hill line =

Railway line in Birmingham, England

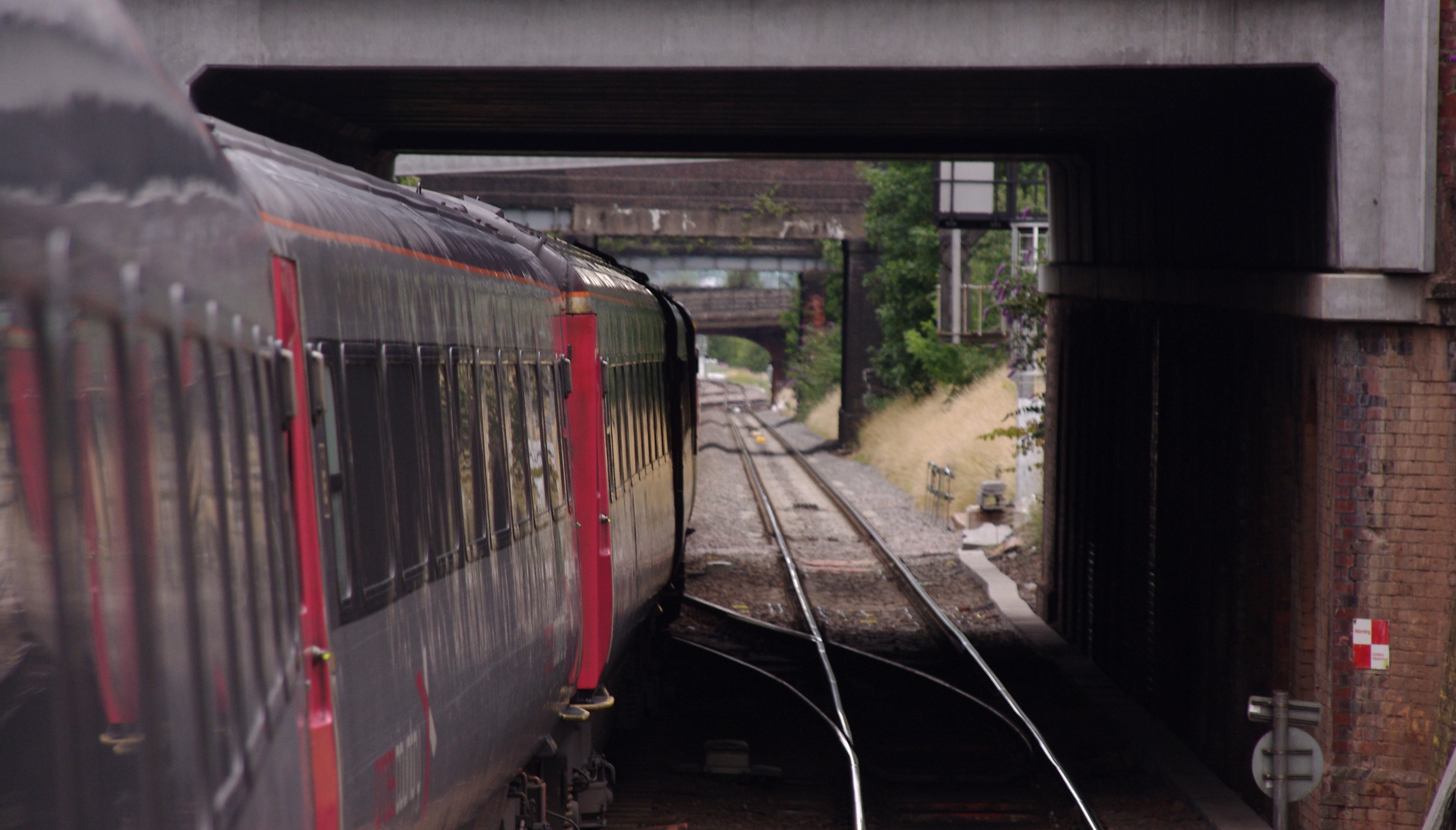
- A non-stop CrossCountry passenger service powers along the Camp Hill line to bypass the University branch

Overview
- Status: Operational
- Owner: Network Rail
- Locale: Birmingham
- Termini: Birmingham New Street; Kings Norton
- Stations: 3

Service
- Type: Heavy rail
- System: National Rail
- Operator(s): CrossCountry; West Midlands Trains
- Rolling stock: Class 170 "Turbostar"; Class 172 "Turbostar"; Class 196 "Civity"; Class 220 "Voyager"; Class 221 "Super Voyager"

History
- Opened: 1840–41

Technical
- Number of tracks: 2
- Track gauge: 4 ft 8 1/2 in (1,435 mm) standard gauge
Route map
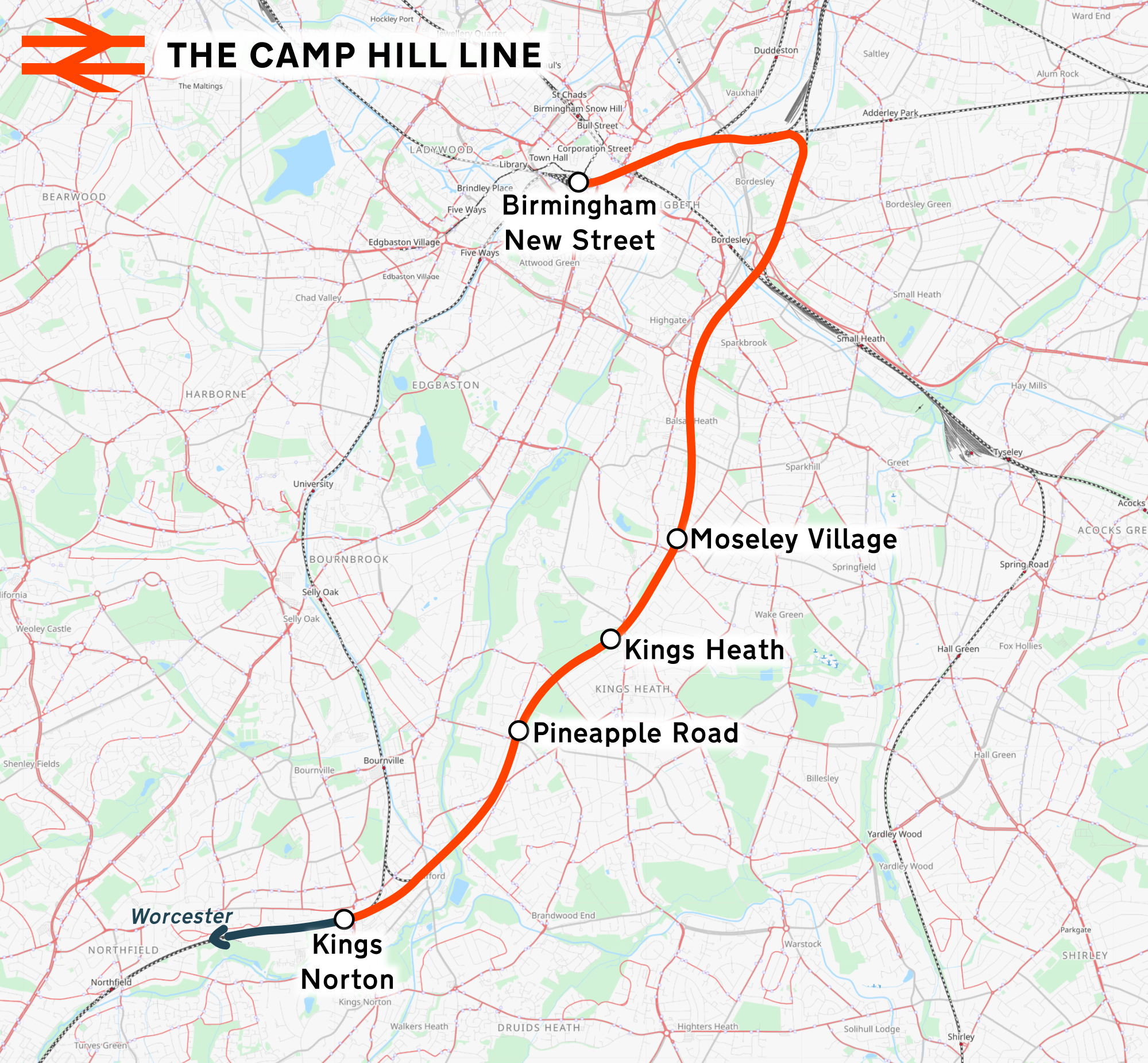
(Click to expand)

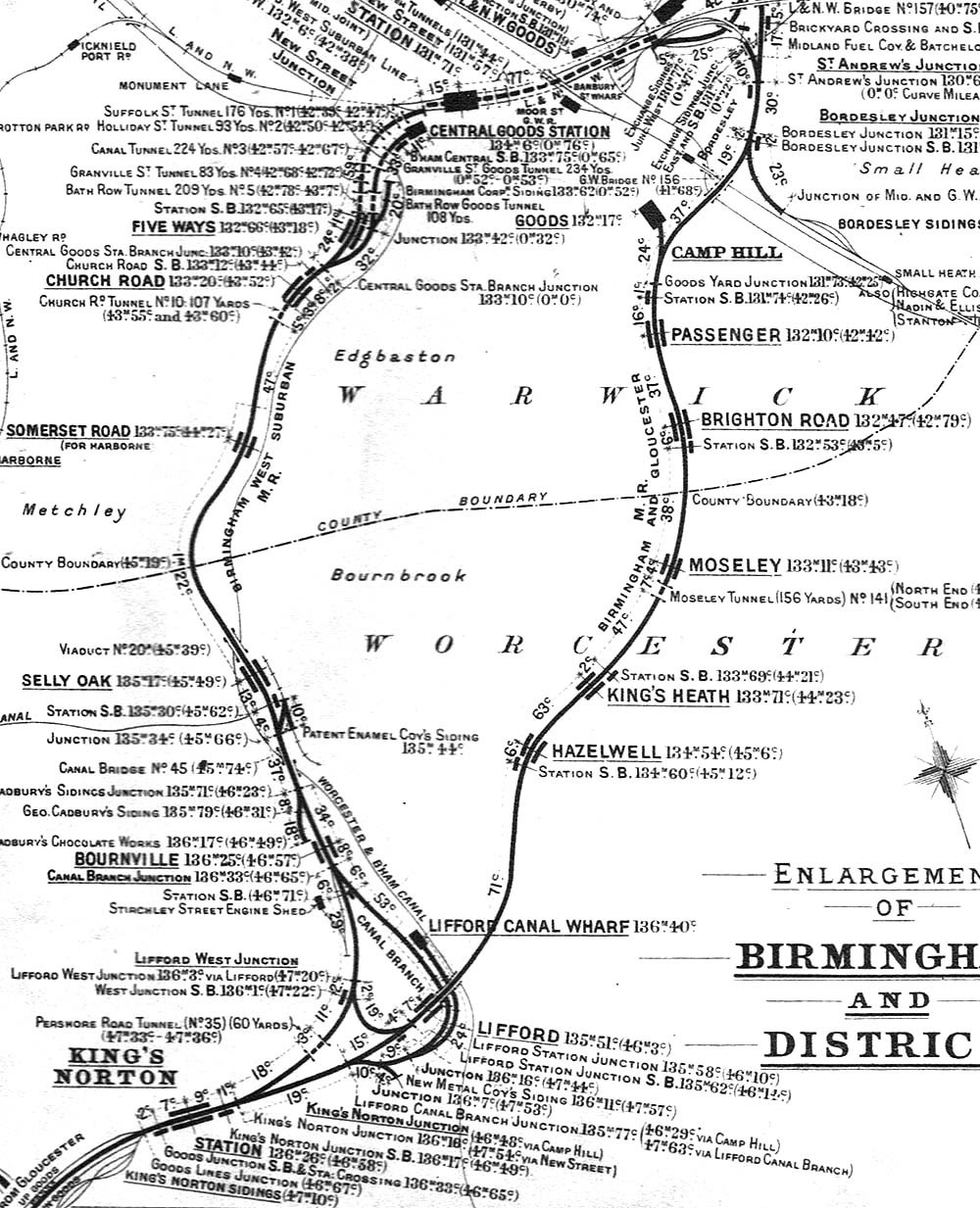
A 1913 map showing the Birmingham West Suburban Railway (left) and the Camp Hill line (right) between Kings Norton and Birmingham New Street

The Camp Hill line is a railway line in Birmingham between Kings Norton and Birmingham New Street. Its official ELR designation is the St Andrews Junction to Kings Norton line, as the line piggybacks the station approach of the Rugby–Birmingham–Stafford line (accessed via St Andrews Junction and Grand Junction) to enter Birmingham New Street.

The line was once the terminal approach of the Birmingham and Gloucester Railway to Curzon Street before it was incorporated into the Midland Railway and subsequently rerouted to the new Birmingham New Street terminus. The expansion of the Birmingham West Suburban Railway (and the concurrent conversion of New Street into a through station) resulted in its usurping of the line as the service's primary route. From this point the name ‘Camp Hill line’ was used, named after its original terminus.

Local passenger services on the line ended in the 1940s and the intermediate stations on the line were closed. From then on until 2026 it was used primarily by freight trains and some longer-distance passenger trains only.

In early March 2026, the date for the resumption of local passenger services was announced, and the line and stations officially reopened on 7 April 2026. The reopened line runs into Birmingham New Street station, but there are plans to construct new chords at Bordesley station to link the line to Birmingham Moor Street.

== History ==
It opened as the northernmost stretch of the Birmingham and Gloucester Railway (B&GR) in December 1840 and ran from Gloucester to a temporary terminus at Camp Hill. The line was extended into Curzon Street – the main station in Birmingham at that time – in August the following year, with the original Camp Hill terminus being split into a smaller passenger station and a goods station, the latter of which remained open until 1966. The B&GR itself was incorporated into the Midland Railway in 1845. The terminus then later switched from Curzon Street to Birmingham New Street station upon its opening in 1854.

In 1861 a junction was constructed at Bordesley, creating a north to south-east connection from the Camp Hill line to the Great Western Railway's mainline to Oxford and London (which remains in use as the Chiltern Main Line), and allows trains from Oxford and beyond to run into Birmingham New Street via the Camp Hill line.

In 1864 a 'direct' line was opened between St Andrews and Landor Street Junctions at the north end of the Camp Hill line, connecting it to the Midland Railway's line to Derby. From this date Midland expresses from Derby to Bristol by-passed New Street, and ran via this route to Camp Hill station, where portions of the train bound for Birmingham New Street would be detached or attached from the train. As both the Midland Railway lines from Derby and Bristol approached New Street from the east, this arrangement avoided the need for them to reverse at New Street and thus save time. This arrangement was unsatisfactory, but it persisted until 1885 when the Midland Railway extended the Birmingham West Suburban Railway (BWSR) into New Street from the west, allowing Derby to Bristol trains to run directly through New Street without reversing and rejoin the B&GR route at Kings Norton railway station. With the BWSR in effect replacing the former B&GR mainline as the express route to Birmingham New Street, the route became known as the Camp Hill line.

In 1892, the Lifford Curve opened, creating a north-facing connection between the Camp Hill line and the Birmingham West Suburban Railway, allowing a circular service to operate from New Street via the Camp Hill line and returning via the BWSR (or vice versa). Local passenger services and all six passenger stations along the Camp Hill line were closed as a wartime rationalisation of the network in 1941 and were confirmed as permanently closed in 1946. All station buildings were subsequently demolished. From then until 2026, the line was used by freight trains and some longer distance passenger trains only.

== Reinstatement of passenger services ==
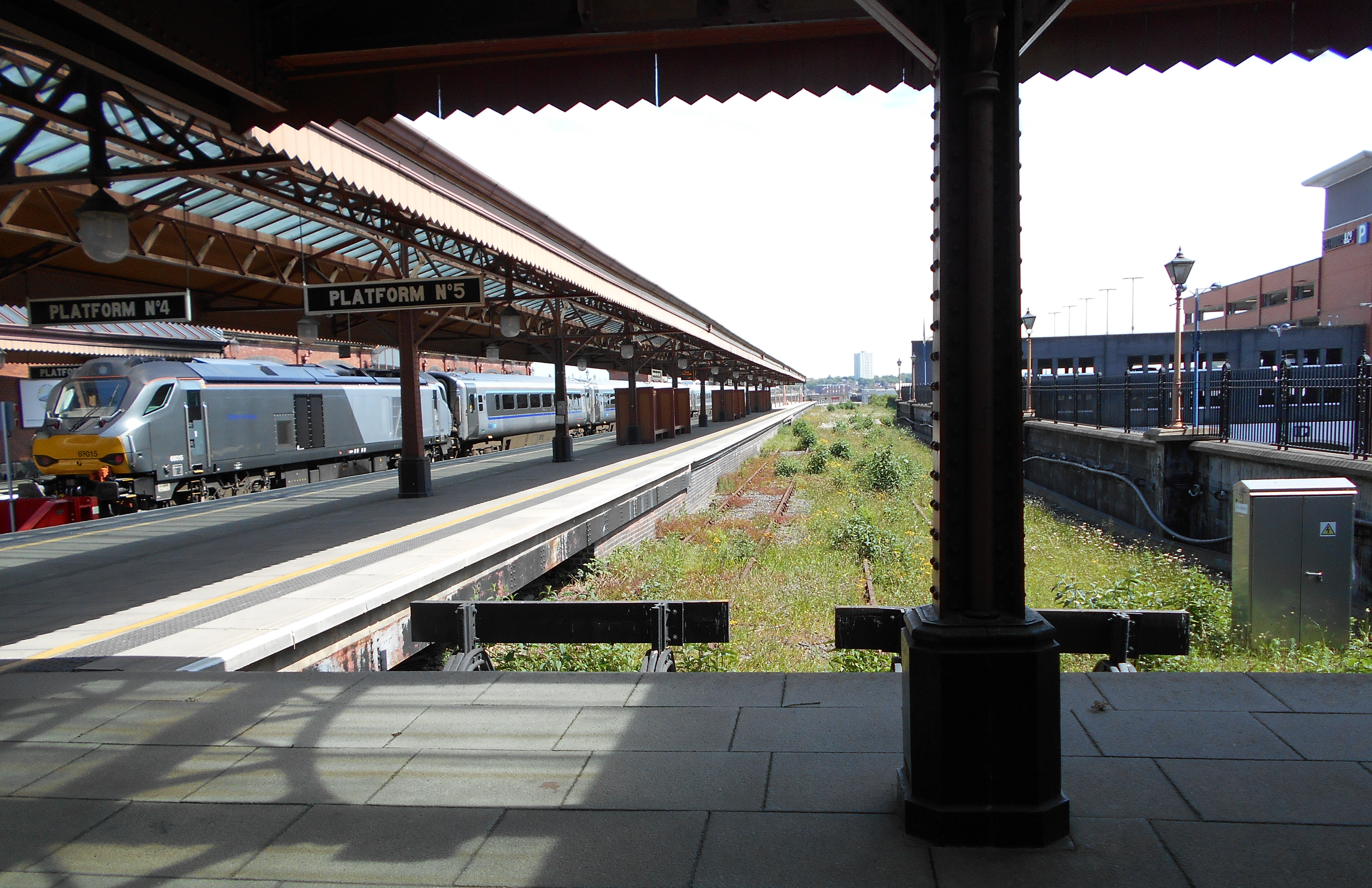
The currently disused termini platform 5 and the proposed new platform 6 at Moor Street

=== Initial reopening plans ===
The reinstatement of local rail services to the former Camp Hill line had been a long-term aspiration of the city. During 2007, Birmingham City Council announced that they were looking into the possibility of reopening the line between Kings Norton and Birmingham Moor Street via the construction of a railway viaduct from Sparkbrook to Bordesley, where trains would be taken into Birmingham Moor Street station. In October 2007, a 1,500-name petition was delivered to the council calling for the line to be re-opened. The 2007 proposed station sites were Moseley, Kings Heath, and Hazelwell. In 2013 the proposal was shelved indefinitely.

In 2016, the newly created West Midlands Combined Authority revived the plans to restore local passenger services to the line and declared it one of their priority transport schemes to be delivered by 2025.

In 2017, officials were said to be investigating the business case for a fourth station at Balsall Heath (previously called Brighton Road). This would mean Lifford and Camp Hill would be the only stations not to be reopened.

In August 2017, West Midlands Trains announced plans as part of their franchise deal to reopen the stations by December 2019 as part of a £1 billion investment in the West Midlands. This included a new station at Moseley.

In February 2018, West Midlands mayor, Andy Street said that the viaduct would not immediately be needed to open the line. Hereford to Birmingham New Street trains – currently routed via University Station – would be diverted along the Camp Hill line to serve the three new stations, meaning that extra capacity at Birmingham New Street would not be required. This would also facilitate through train operation toward Shrewsbury. in 2019, the line was identified by Campaign for Better Transport as a priority 1 candidate for reopening.

=== Planning and construction ===
In September 2018, the designs of the new stations for Kings Heath, Hazelwell and Moseley were revealed. Plans were for an opening date in 2021 with the stations being served by two trains per hour. Funding was announced for the project in March 2021 and the expected opening date was pushed back to 2023. In June 2022, West Midlands Rail Executive announced that following a public consultation, the three stations would be named Moseley Village, Kings Heath and Pineapple Road. In 2023, the business case for reopening Brighton Road as Balsall Heath railway station was under consideration. This would require construction of the Bordesley Chords to link the Camp Hill Line to Moor Street Station, and also for capacity to be increased at Moor Street, as New Street already operates at capacity.

The reopening of the line for passenger use was hit by a series of delays, with the West Midlands Combined Authority eventually aiming for early 2026. In February 2026, the timetable for the new service was released. West Midlands Railway intended running the service every half an hour for most of the day, with three hourly trains in the late evening, from Monday to Saturday, in both directions, with an hourly service on Sundays.

=== Opening ===
The newly built Moseley Village, Pineapple Road and Kings Heath stations opened on 7 April 2026 and are in Zone 3 of TfWM's ticketing system. There were 35,000 passenger journeys through the new stations in their first three weeks of operation.

== Bordesley Chords ==
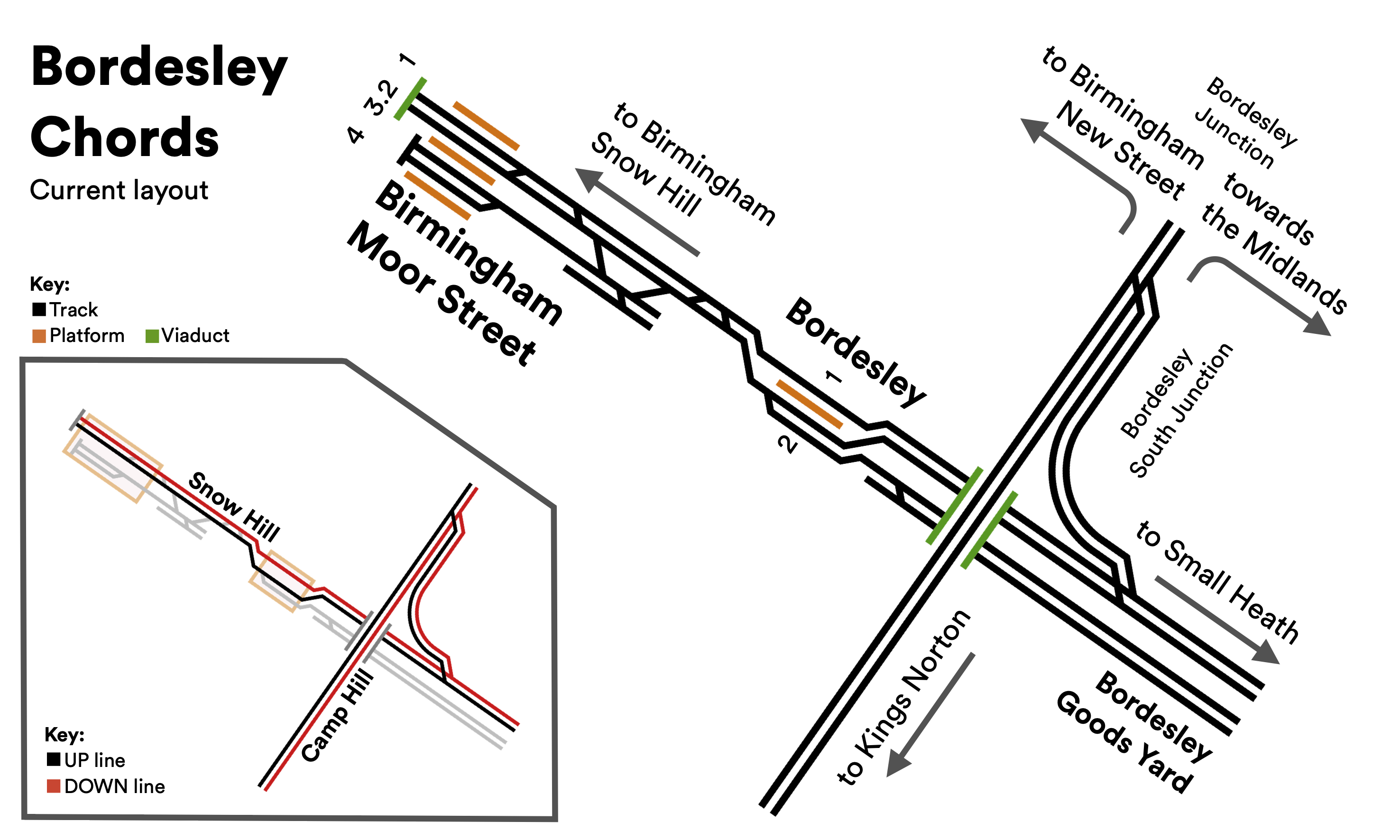
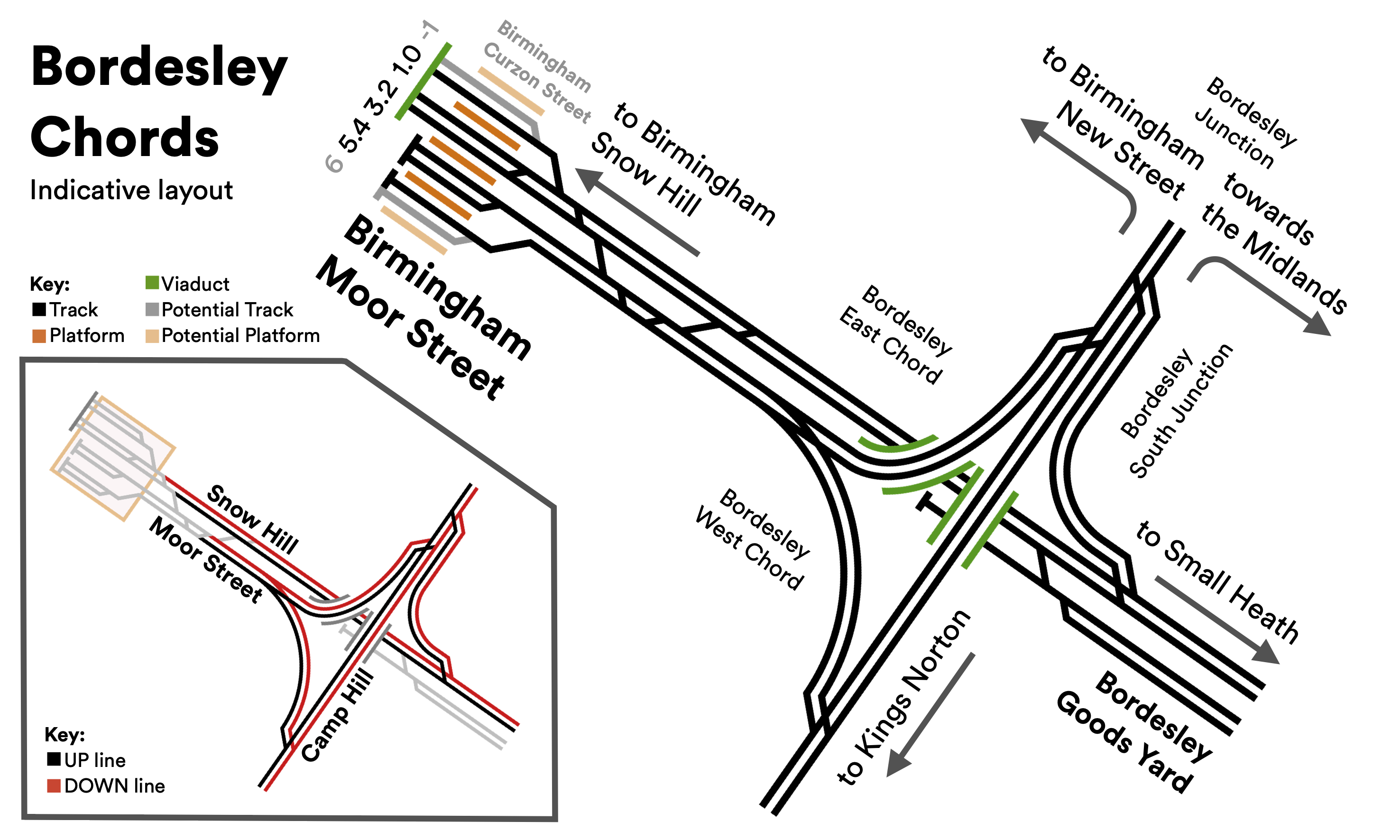
Indicative drawings of the current Bordesley Junctions and proposed Bordesley Chords

In July 2018, the Midlands Rail Hub proposal was unveiled, which included the reopening of Moseley, Kings Heath, and Hazelwell stations, and the building of set of chords (short connecting curves of track) on new viaducts near Bordesley station known as the Bordesley Chords.

Although the new Camp Hill line services will initially run on existing track into New Street, the long-term aim is to divert them into Moor Street via the new chords. Currently the Camp Hill line – already extensively connected to the Cross-City Line, Cross Country Route, and WCML – passes over the Chiltern Main Line, and they are only connected by a junction to the east of the crossing. The new chords would be constructed to the north and west of the crossing, known as the 'East Chord' and 'West Chord' respectively, connecting Moor Street to Kings Norton to the southwest and Water Orton to the northeast. The chords would also allow a number of services from East Midlands destinations, such as Derby and Leicester, to be diverted into Moor Street.

In conjunction with the construction of the chords, one of the currently derelict terminus platforms at Moor Street would be reopened (Platform 5) and a new through platform to Snow Hill constructed (Platform 0) in order to accommodate the new services. There is also the potential for a new terminus platform (Platform 6) to be opened and another through platform (Platform −1) added depending on funding and engineering limitations.

Furthermore, construction of the chords would necessitate the closure and demolition of the semi-operational Bordesley station. Consultation has opened in regard to Network Rail's request to close the station, timed to line up with the nearby opening of the new Sports Quarter, replacing St Andrew's as the Birmingham City FC ground. The majority of matchday traffic would instead be moved by the planned West Midlands Metro extension to north Solihull. Rerouting of the up/down Snow Hill lines between Moor Street and the chords would also be required.

== Bibliography ==
- Christiansen, Rex (1983). A Regional History of the Railways of Great Britain, Volume 7 The West Midlands. David St John Thomas David & Charles. ISBN 0-946537-00-3.
- Boynton, John (1993). Rails Across The City, The Story of The Birmingham Cross City Line. Kidderminster: Mid England Books. ISBN 0-9522248-0-1.
