= Lifford, Birmingham =

Coordinates: 52.4172°N 1.9186°W

Lifford is a small area of Birmingham, England, located near Stirchley and Cotteridge. It is centred on the Lifford Reservoir.

It was served by Lifford railway station which closed as a war-time economy measure during World War II, never to re-open.
