= Transport for West Midlands =

Transport regulatory body in West Midlands

- Location of the West Midlands within the United Kingdom
- Abbreviation: TfWM
- Predecessor: West Midlands Passenger Transport Executive; West Midlands Integrated Transport Authority
- Formation: 17 June 2016; 10 years ago
- Type: Public body
- Purpose: Transport authority
- Headquarters: 16 Summer Lane; Birmingham, England
- Region served: West Midlands (county)
- Managing Director: Anne Shaw
- Parent organization: West Midlands Combined Authority
- Website: www.tfwm.org.uk

Transport for West Midlands (TfWM) is the public body responsible for co-ordinating transport services in the West Midlands metropolitan county in England. It is an executive body of the West Midlands Combined Authority (WMCA), with bus franchising and highway management powers similar to Transport for London. TfWM's policies and strategy are set by the Transport Delivery Committee of the WMCA.

TfWM's initial priorities upon its establishment in 2016 were the expansion of the West Midlands Metro through East Birmingham, Brierley Hill and Birmingham Airport, improvements to the M5 and M6 motorways, and new cycle routes as part of a metropolitan cycle network. There are also plans to work with central government over the future of the underused M6 Toll.

== History ==
Before 2016, public transport services in the West Midlands were co-ordinated by the West Midlands Passenger Transport Executive, which adopted the brand Centro in 1990. Centro's policies were set by the West Midlands Integrated Transport Authority (WMITA). TfWM absorbed the functions, responsibilities, assets and staff of both of these organisations in June 2016, and the predecessor organisations were dissolved.

== Governance ==
The WMCA's Transport Delivery Committee is a 19-member sub-committee of the Combined Authority Board. It forms part of TfWM's activities, and provides oversight of the operational delivery of transport across the West Midlands and advises the Combined Authority Board, through the Transport Portfolio Holder, on transport policy matters. The members are nominated by their respective local authorities; Birmingham City Council nominating seven members, the six other Metropolitan Boroughs nominating two members each. Each member has a single vote. The Chair and Vice-Chair of the Transport Delivery Committee are appointed by the Combined Authority Board.

== Responsibilities ==
Map showing Rail and Tram routes in the West Midlands County (Hednesford is also part of the Rail map)

The WMCA is the Local Transport Authority and has a statutory responsibility to implement policies and strategies that co-ordinate and promote the use of public transport in the West Midlands. The WMCA's transport responsibilities include:

=== Strategy ===
- Setting and monitoring the authority's transport budget, determining the grants to be made to passenger transport companies, and determining the borrowing limits of the Combined Authority in relation to transport matters.
- The allocation and prioritisation of central government grants and other forms of funding.
- Long-term strategy for the West Midlands transport system, contributing to regional economic development through a network of high-volume public transport corridors.
- Constructing and maintaining public transport infrastructure (bus, Metro stations, for example).
- Working with public transport operators, the police, and district councils for the promotion of safe, efficient, and economic transport facilities and services.
- Providing integration between public transport modes, including the provision of interchanges.
- Promoting and publicising the public transport network and providing travel information.

=== Rail/Light Rail ===
- Developing a rapid transit network, including West Midlands Metro and the Coventry Very Light Rail.
- Developing the rail network in partnership with Network Rail and train operating companies, and formulating policies regarding a devolved rail franchise from October 2017.
- Maximising the benefits of HS2 across the West Midlands region.

=== Bus ===
In May 2025, it was announced that the West Midlands bus network would be brought back under public control for the first time since the 1980s, with TfWM becoming responsible for franchising bus services to private operators, and setting the fares, timetables and routes of the bus services operating in the county. This is expected to take effect in late 2027. In August 2026, it was announced WMCA would buy back West Midlands Travel from National Express (now owned by Mobico), in order to support the transition to a franchising system from October 2027.

=== Ticketing and Fares ===
- Operating a concessionary fares scheme and implementing the government's National Concessionary Scheme.
- Integrated ticketing and developing smartcard ticketing technology within the region.
- Providing an annual grant to the operator of the door-to-door Ring and Ride service for people who have difficulty using other public transport facilities. (Currently this is operated by Accessible Transport, part of National Express West Midlands.)

=== Highways ===
- Management of the West Midlands Key Route Network (WM-KRN) on behalf of the metropolitan boroughs and the mayor.
- Create and promote an effective freight strategy throughout the metropolitan area.

== Branding ==
Network West Midlands was the brand used by TfWM when it assumed responsibility for public transport from Centro in 2016. In 2018, the system was rebranded as "West Midlands Network," with a diamond motif designed to emulate the success of the Transport for London roundel. The identity uses LL Circular by Lineto as the primary typeface, replacing the Network typeface that was previously used. All public transport infrastructure will carry the identity, with signage and liveries being replaced on a rolling basis.

In 2021, it was announced that the "West Midlands Network" moniker would be dropped, leaving "Transport for West Midlands" as the public-facing brand.

Corporate identities showcased by TfWM when it was first announced in 2018.

== Key projects ==
=== Coventry Very Light Rail ===
A new tram system in Coventry, Coventry Very Light Rail, is planned to open by 2027, with a network of 4-6 lines open by 2040. The first vehicle left the assembly line in March 2021 and was taken on a showcase in the city before being taken to Dudley for testing.

=== High-speed rail ===
In August 2009, TfWM's predecessor, Centro, backed construction of a new railway in the West Midlands region for use by High Speed 2 trains, which would allow existing lines to have "better and more frequent local services".

=== Sprint bus network ===
Sprint is a bus rapid transit scheme under construction between Walsall, Birmingham and Solihull. Further routes are planned across the region.

=== West Midlands Bus ===
The shared West Midlands branding, here red for bus

On 19 August 2018 National Express West Midlands and Diamond launched a joint timetable on services 42 West Bromwich to Tipton/Dudley and 43 West Bromwich to Bilston and 31 Mossley to Walsall 32 Lower Farm to Walsall, with National Express and Diamond buses repainted in red liveries carrying West Midlands Bus route branding.

From 15 March 2020 National Express West Midlands and Diamond launched a joint timetable on services 40 West Bromwich to Wednesbury via Friar Park.

In August 2021, Diamond announced that they would cease running joint timetables on partnership services (withdrawing completely from service 32) and no longer serve Dudley on service 42, citing loss of revenue due to Covid-19 travel restrictions.

On 5 December 2021 the partnership was back on for services 31/32; 42/43 and 40.

In July 2024, it was reported that the Mayor of the West Midlands, Richard Parker, believed that buses within the West Midlands Combined Authority (WMCA) area could be under public control from 2027. A final decision could be made by March 2025, after an independent audit and public consultation.

=== West Midlands Cycle Hire ===
The shared West Midlands branding, here green for cycling

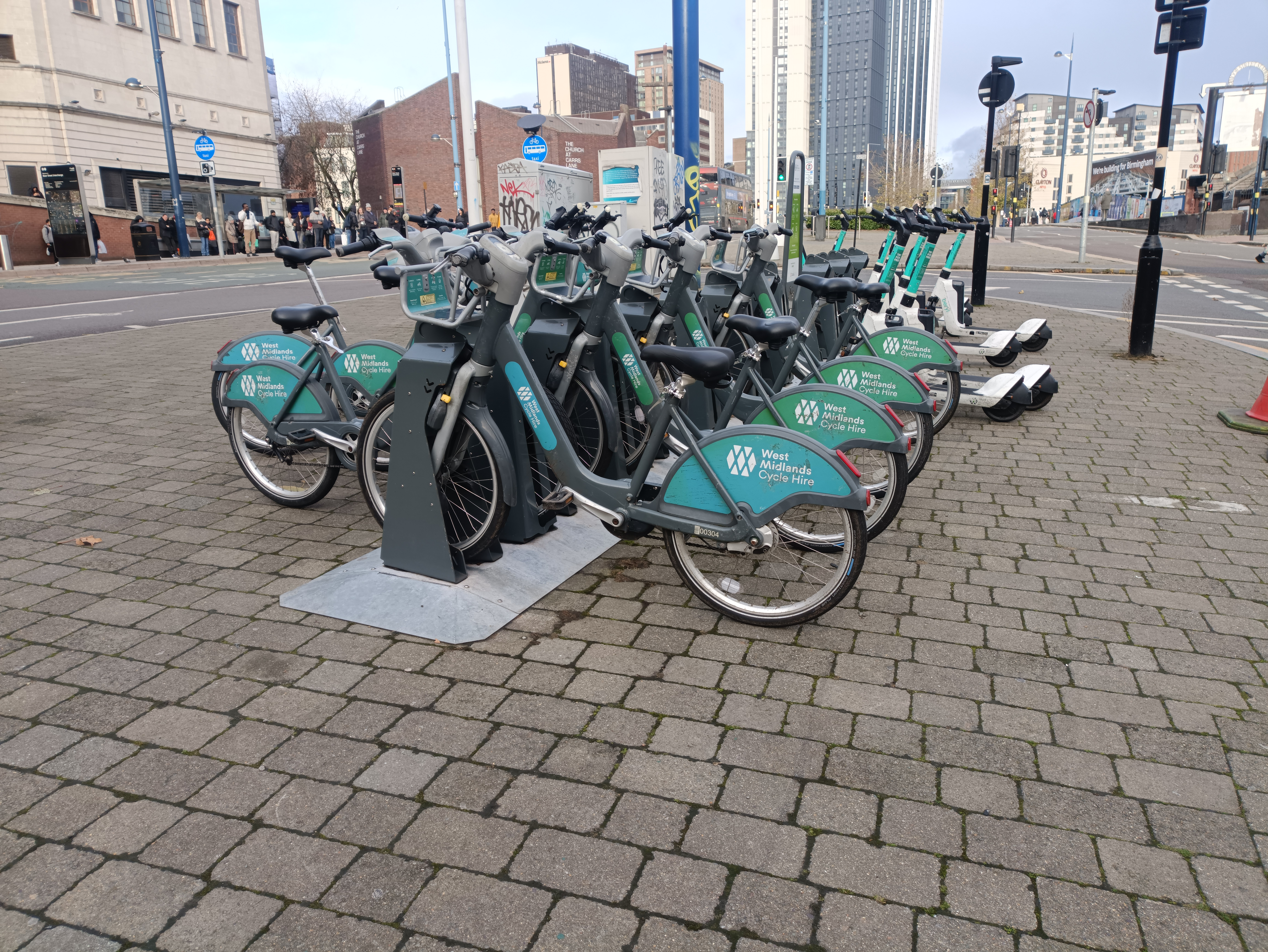
West Midlands cycle hire parking at Birmingham Moor Street in November 2025

As part of the "Starley Network" Scheme across the West Midlands, a new transport mode by Transport for West Midlands was unveiled: West Midlands Cycle Hire (also known informally as West Midlands Cycle). As part of this a "West Midlands Walking and Cycling Commissioner" was appointed, Adam Tranter, whose job is to encourage Cycling and Walking as not just an activity, but a mode of transport. Projects to help this include things such as Birmingham's planned 200 km Dutch Cycling Network, Coventry's Starley Network of multiple safe, Dutch style cycleways, and a new Cycle Hire Scheme.

In March 2021, Cycle Hire Docking Stations started to appear across the West Midlands, in Coventry, Birmingham, Dudley, Wolverhampton and Sutton Coldfield. Bikes can be hired for as long as you like and the cost of travel is often less than the equivalent bus journey. The scheme has been successful with 200,000 journeys taken in its first year and was expanded to areas such as Warwick University and Selly Oak.

However, in March 2024 it was reported that hundreds of the cycle hire bikes had gone missing or been vandalised. The cost for vandalism and repairs was £316,000.

At the end of March 2026, the previous West Midlands Cycle Hire scheme was closed, and replaced with a new service operated by Lime. The new agreement meant that, for the first time, the cycle hire scheme came at no cost to the taxpayer. It had previously cost £1.4 million per year to run.

=== West Midlands Metro ===
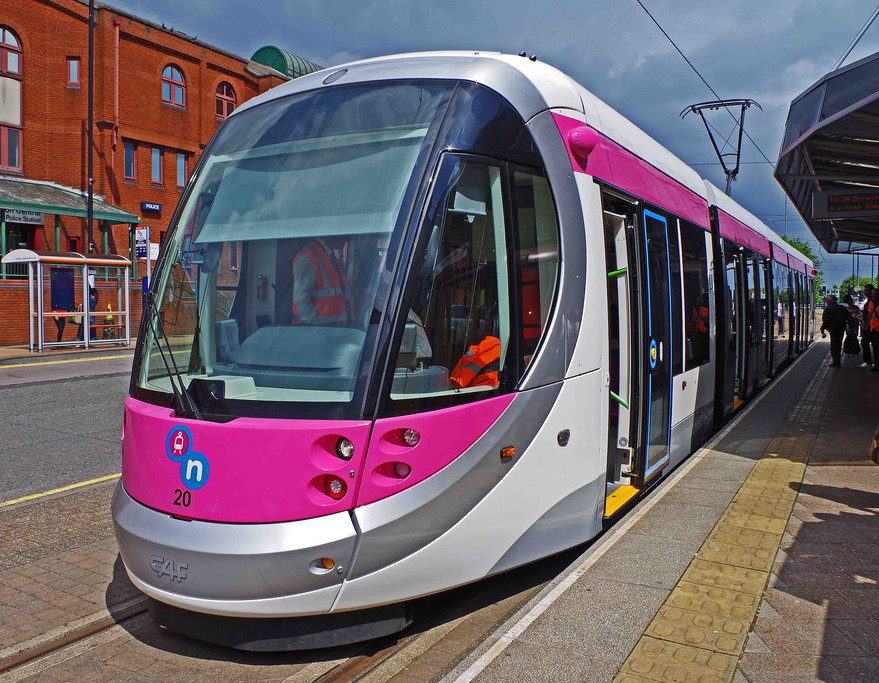
Midland Metro Urbos 3 tram in the original livery in Wolverhampton in June 2014

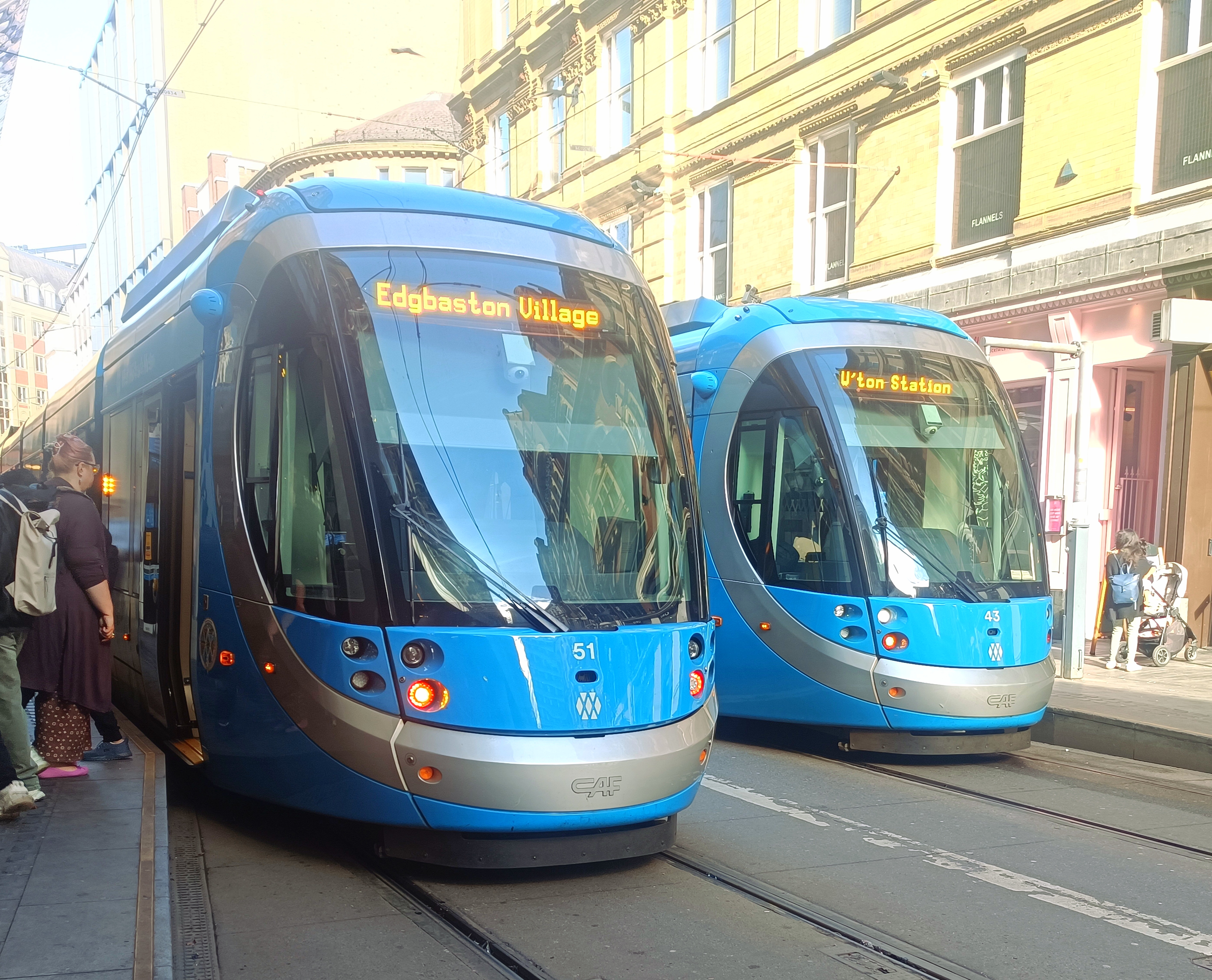
West Midlands Metro trams at Grand Central tram stop in September 2025

TfWM's predecessor, Centro, was responsible for the reintroduction of tram services to the West Midlands, with the development of the Midland Metro, now known as West Midlands Metro. Plans for a multi-line light rail system for the West Midlands were first drawn up in the early 1980s. The first (and so far only) line of the Midland Metro was opened in May 1999 between Birmingham and Wolverhampton. The line's first extension into the streets of Birmingham city centre, from its original terminus at Birmingham Snow Hill to Grand Central opened in May 2016. 2 Lines are currently under construction in Dudley and Brierley Hill with 7 miles (11 km) of new track and work on another to serve Birmingham Curzon Street railway station (a High Speed 2 station), Digbeth has begun. Over £1bn of funding for a further 3 lines has been received to serve the areas of Walsall, Stourbridge & Halesowen.

=== Railway line and station reopenings ===
TfWM has been active in promoting the restoration of passenger services to both the Camp Hill line and the Walsall to Wolverhampton Line, with five new stations opening or reopening, including Moseley Village, Kings Heath and Pineapple Road stations on the Camp Hill line, and Darlaston and Wilenhall stations on the Walsall-Wolverhampton route. Both routes opened in 2026.

== Ticketing ==
TfWM is committed to the introduction of an integrated ticketing system. "n" branded tickets are valid across the entire network, on any operator within the TfWM area.

nBus tickets are valid on almost all operators' services in the West Midlands county. Tickets can be purchased for travel within various local travel areas or across the whole of the county, and are valid for periods ranging from one day to a year. Metro travel may be added onto nBus passes.

nTrain passes are valid on all local train services within the Network West Midlands zonal rail map (including Hednesford), or to select out-of-county stations in the Birmingham travel-to-work metropolitan area.

Swift is the multi-modal, multi-operator smart travel card, similar to the Oyster card scheme in London. Rather than being a single card, it is a range of contactless passes and cards that share a common system and brand name. Centro began a phased rollout of the Swift card scheme in 2012, which was still ongoing in 2016 when responsibility for the scheme passed to TfWM. The system is expected to be extended across the local rail network as part of rail devolution in the West Midlands.

== See also ==
- Transport in Birmingham
