= Lifford railway station =

Former railway station in England

Lifford
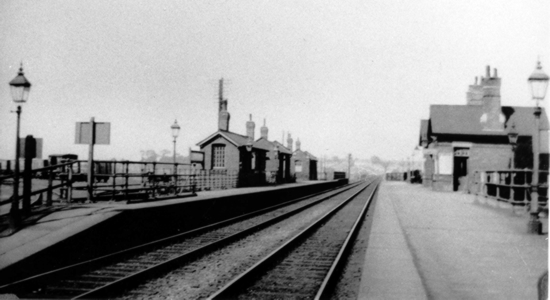
- Lifford Railway Station

General information
- Location: Cotteridge, Birmingham; England
- Coordinates: 52.4194°N 1.9200°W
- Grid reference: SP055801
- Platforms: 2

Other information
- Status: Disused

History
- Original company: Birmingham and Gloucester Railway
- Pre-grouping: Midland Railway
- Post-grouping: London Midland and Scottish Railway

Key dates
- 1840: B&GR station opened
- 1875: B&GR station closed
- 1876: BWSR station opened
- 1885: BWSR station closed; Midland station opened
- 27 January 1941: Midland station closed
Location

Lifford railway station refers to a series of railway stations in Cotteridge, Birmingham, England.

== History ==
There were three stations at different times in the vicinity named Lifford.

- Lifford station (1840–1875) on the Birmingham and Gloucester Railway (now the Camp Hill line)
- Lifford station (1876–1885) on the Birmingham West Suburban Railway (now the Cross-City Line)
- Lifford station (1885–1941) on the Midland Railway (formerly the B&GR)

The first station opened on 17 December 1840 on the Birmingham and Gloucester (B&GR) main line. This was absorbed into the Midland Railway in 1845. The original station closed in 1875.

The second station opened on 1 June 1876 as the terminus of the Midland Railway's Birmingham West Suburban Railway (BWSR) to Granville Street. It closed on 28 September 1885.

The third station opened on 28 September 1885 and was located proximal to the site of the original station on the former B&GR. It closed in 1941 due to Second World War economy measures.

Although the Camp Hill line and three of its former stations reopened to passenger services in April 2026, Lifford was not included.

== Station masters ==
- W.H. Townson 1864
- G. Hawley 1864—1866
- F. Symonds 1866
- B. Lunn 1866—?
- Edwin Brownett c.1871—1902
- A. Walker 1902—1906
- Josiah Farndon 1906—1914
- A. Edkins 1940—1941
  (also station master at Kings Norton)

Preceding station	Disused railways	Following station
Kings Norton	Midland Railway; Camp Hill line	Hazelwell
