= Birmingham and Gloucester Railway =

British railway company (1839–1847)

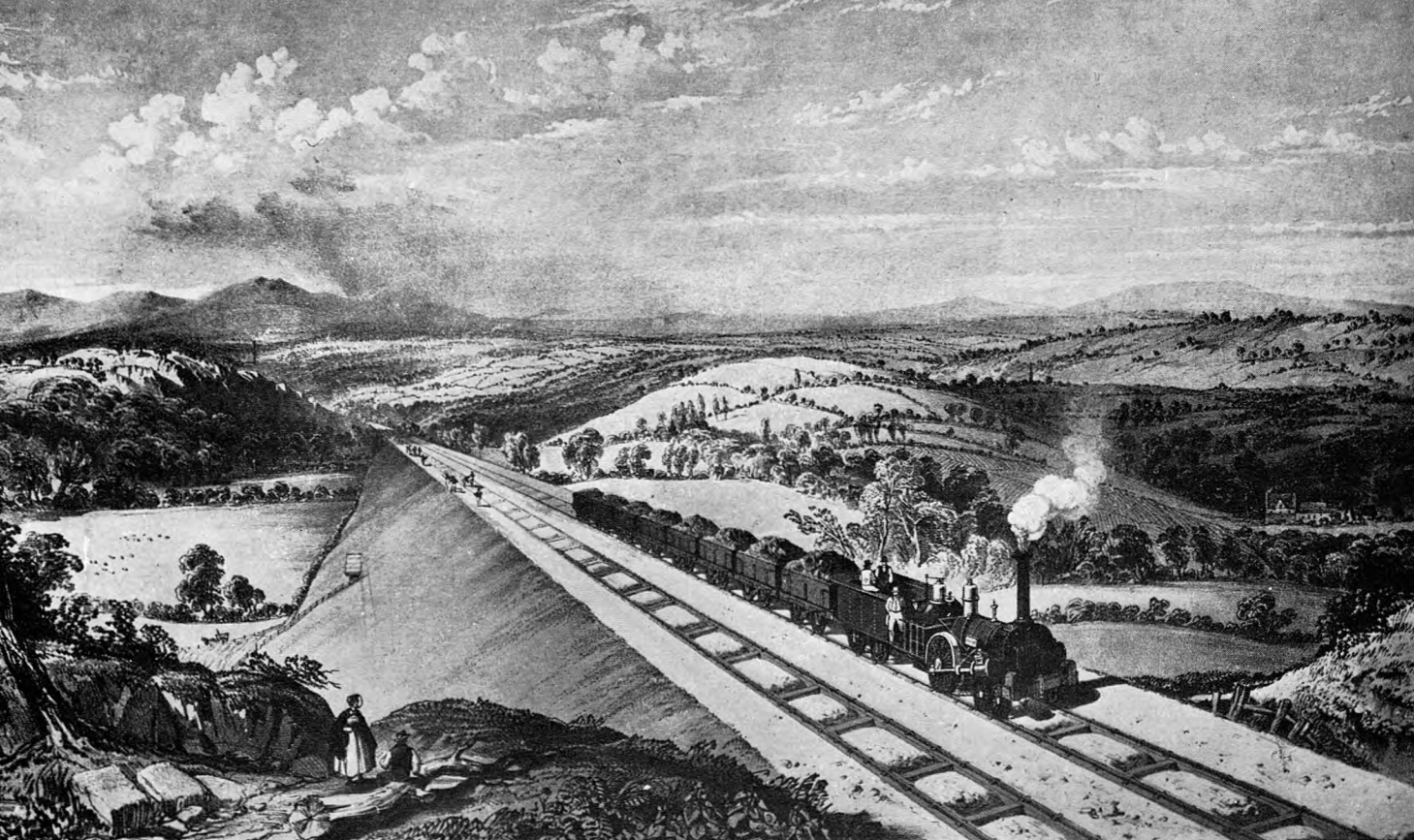
- Illustration depicting the Norris Class A Extra locomotive Philadelphia climbing the Lickey Incline on the Birmingham and Gloucester Railway, c.1841

Overview
- Status: Open (integrated into network)
- Owner: Network Rail
- Termini: Birmingham New Street (1845–1846) Birmingham Curzon Street (1841– 1854) Birmingham Camp Hill (1840–1841); Gloucester (1840–1846)

History
- Opened: 24 June 1840
- Closed: 3 August 1846 (integrated)

Technical
- Track gauge: 1,435 mm (4 ft 8 1/2 in) standard gauge
Route map (1845)
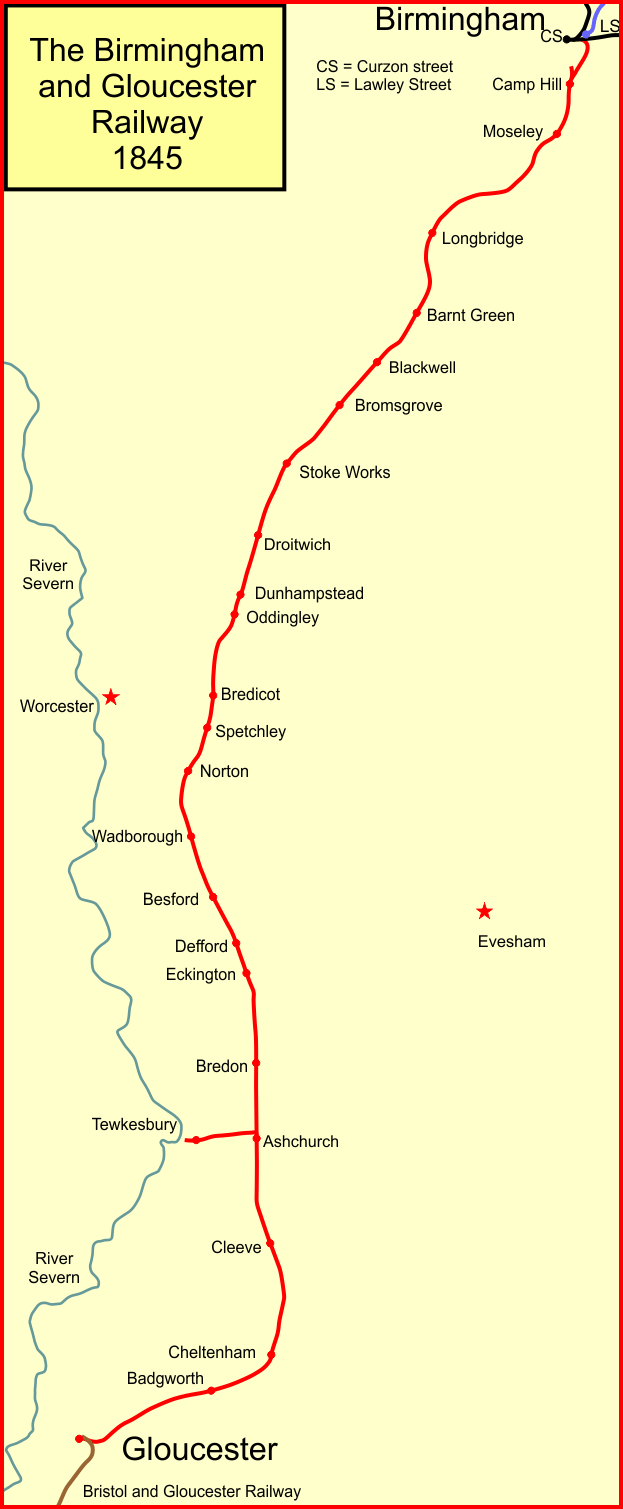
(Click to expand)

The Birmingham and Gloucester Railway (B&GR) was the first name of the railway linking the cities in its name and of the company which pioneered and developed it; the line opened in stages in 1840, using a terminus at Camp Hill in Birmingham. It linked with the Bristol and Gloucester Railway in Gloucester, but at first that company's line was broad gauge, and Gloucester was a point of the necessary but inconvenient transhipment of goods and passengers onto 4 ft 8 1/2 in (1,435 mm) standard gauge that became the national standard. Nearly all of the original main line remains active as a trunk route, also known as an arterial line.

Its main line incorporated the Lickey Incline 2 miles (3.2 km) of track climbing a 1-in-37 (2.7%) gradient, northbound (and descending in the other). The climb was a significant challenge for many heavy loads and less powerful engines during the era of steam traction.

Having attracted its own patronage and capital, and accomplished the full transformation and use of land, buildings, labour force, and rolling stock, it was acquired by the Midland Railway in 1846.

== First proposals ==
The idea for a railway line between Bristol and Birmingham was put forward during the construction of the Stockton and Darlington Railway. 78,000 tons of goods were conveyed from Birmingham to Bristol annually, a journey that took nearly a week, and the cost of the journey was high. At a meeting in Bristol on 13 December 1824 subscriptions were taken for a proposed Bristol, Northern and Western Railway. Investors, among which wealthy venture capitalists, were enthusiasts of the scheme and before the fund promoters' prospectus meeting closed, all the 16,000 shares allocated to Bristol were taken up. A further 9,000 shares were created, the subscription fee and paying-up of which was allocated to other locations, and the total amounted to £1.25 million (equivalent to £1,389 million in 2023), in an era when cheap and plentiful labourers' and professional work would have enabled the construction of thousands of houses or road modifications (e.g. regular bridges) for such a sum. The company surveyed the route in 1825 but there was a financial crisis in 1826 in which investors asked for the project to be suspended, which the company did.

In 1832 the company advanced a new scheme; Isambard Kingdom Brunel was asked to survey a cheap route between Birmingham and Gloucester. He avoided the barrier of the Lickey Hills and his maximum gradient would have been 1 in 300. This scheme too failed to make progress due to lack of funds.

== Birmingham and Gloucester Railway proposed ==
The idea was revived when in 1834 Captain W. S. Moorsom was engaged to survey a route; once again economy was considered to be essential, and his route avoided large towns thus lowered cost of the land. Bypassed townspeople expressed disappointment and Cheltenham was particularly vocal. Moorsom modified his intended route to provide it a station, but that was not considered convenient for the centre of the town, and a branch line was proposed. When the B&GR promoters refused to contemplate the expense of that, Pearson Thompson, a prominent Cheltenham resident and a member of the Gloucester Committee of the B&GR, offered to build it himself at his own expense.

Around Birmingham local politics and geographic factors proved easier; a connection to the London and Birmingham Railway close to the nascent city was agreed, moreover, L&BR agreed to shared use of their Curzon Street station on payment of a toll. As well as giving a direct connection to London, and over the Grand Junction Railway to the north west of England, this avoided the expense of constructing a new terminus in the city.

Moorsom estimated the cost of construction to be £920,000. Moorsom's route did climb the Lickey Ridge directly, involving a long climb. This was divided into two sections: 1 1/4 miles (2.0 km) at 1 in 54 worked by a 96 hp (72 kW) stationary engine, and 1 1/4 miles (2.0 km) at 1 in 36 worked by a 121 hp (90 kW) machine. there was also to be an inclined plane at Gloucester to reach a goods depot at the canal, and another at the connecting line to the L&BR in Birmingham, at 1 in 84.

In the 1836 session of Parliament, the Cheltenham and Great Western Union Railway's plans were likewise considered, and between Gloucester and Cheltenham the two companies proposed almost identical routing. They came to an arrangement by which they would collaborate in the construction. The line between Gloucester and Cheltenham was to be divided, the Cheltenham end being built by the Birmingham company and the Gloucester end by the C&GWUR. Each would build one of the stations and both would have freedom to run over the whole line and use both the stations. The means of dealing with the complexity of the different gauges was not fully specified at first.

A functional plateway tramroad ran between the two: the Gloucester and Cheltenham Tramroad (Note: In its authorising Act of Parliament the company was referred to as the Gloucester and Cheltenham Railway.) that opened in 1810. As well as connecting the two, it had an important branch to quarries at Leckhampton, in the hills south of Cheltenham and terminus at the Gloucester docks. Stone for house building was in demand at the time. Acquisition of the tramroad was sought by the B&GR and the C&GWUR; its alignment was unsuitable for a main line railway but its dock trade and access were very attractive. The collaborative approach to building the new main line extended to the issue of acquiring the tramroad, and it was agreed to do so jointly, for the sum of £35,000.

== Authorisation ==
Birmingham and Gloucester Railway Act 1836
- Act of Parliament
- Parliament of the United Kingdom
- Long title: An Act for making a Railway from Birmingham to Gloucester, with a Branch therefrom.
- Citation: 6 & 7 Will. 4. c. xiv

Dates
- Royal assent: 22 April 1836

Text of statute as originally enacted

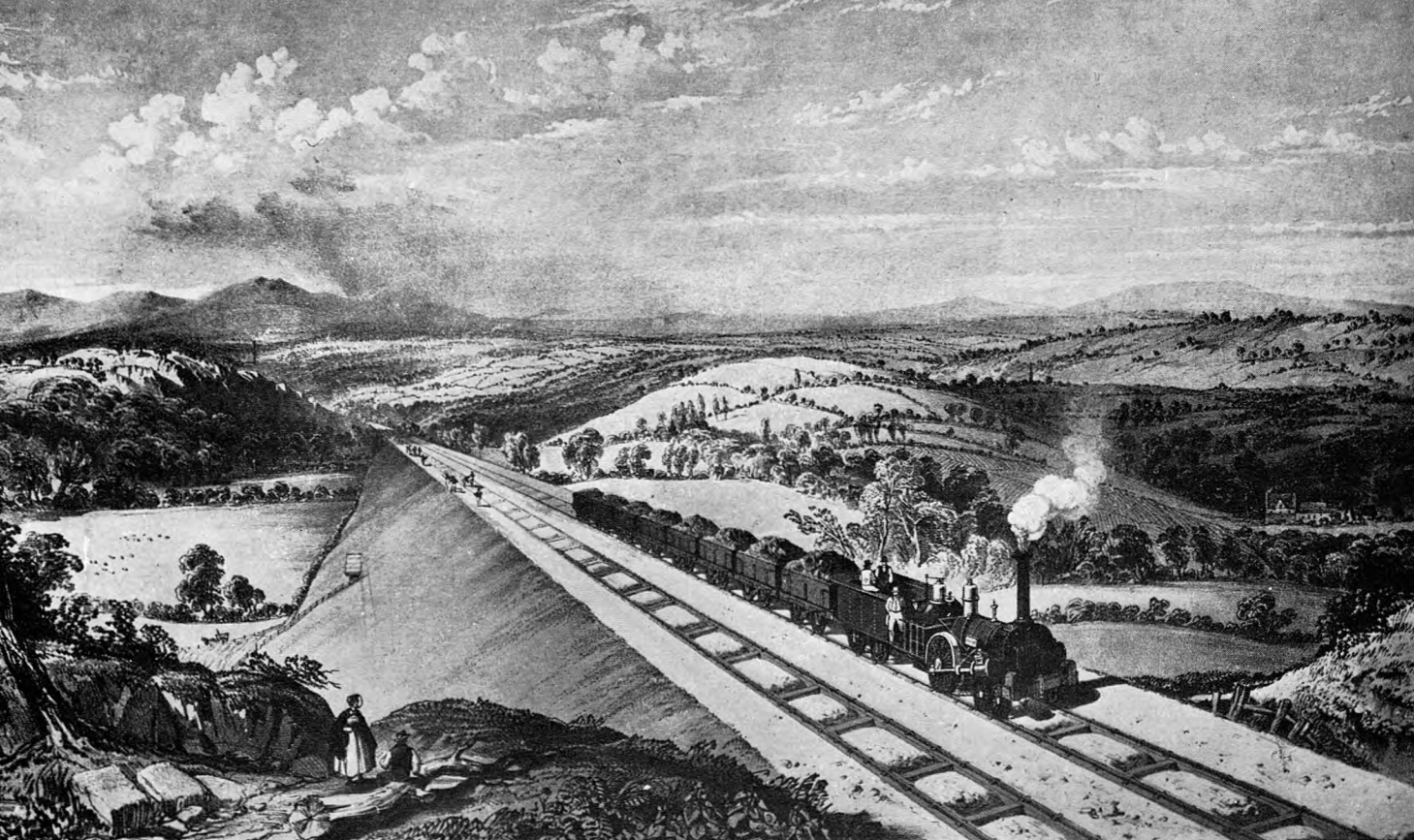
The Lickey Incline about 1845

At this stage the line was conceived as a toll railway (on which independent carriers would run trains, paying the B&GR a toll for that right). The railway received royal assent for its act of Parliament, the Birmingham and Gloucester Railway Act 1836 (6 & 7 Will. 4. c. xiv), on 22 April 1836, with authorised capital of £950,000.

Birmingham and Gloucester Railway (Worcester and Tewkesbury Branches) Act 1837
- Act of Parliament
- Parliament of the United Kingdom
- Long title: An Act to amend an Act passed in the last Session of Parliament, for making a Railway from Birmingham to Gloucester, to extend the Line of the said Railway, and to make Branches therefrom to the City of Worcester and the Town of Tewkesbury.
- Citation: 7 Will. 4 & 1 Vict. c. xxvi

Dates
- Royal assent: 5 May 1837

Other legislation
- Amends: Birmingham and Gloucester Railway Act 1836

Text of statute as originally enacted

Opinion among the parliamentary borough of Worcester's elite and businesses was strong for a much closer line. To assuage fear of other railway company competition, the B&GR agreed to provide it a branch line, from Abbotswood in the county. Similarly Tewkesbury had to be pacified, with a branch line from Ashchurch. These were authorised by the Birmingham and Gloucester Railway (Worcester and Tewkesbury Branches) Act 1837 (7 Will. 4 & 1 Vict. c. xxvi) of 5 May 1837. (Note: From Rake (1904), p. 146; Christiansen does not mention the date in either of the Regional History books (volume 7 and volume 13); Maggs gives 5 May in The Birmingham Gloucester Line.) for extensions to Worcester and Tewkesbury.

Construction had been delayed due to high prices and the difficulty of obtaining access to the land on the route, but in April 1837 it was started in earnest. However a group of shareholders cast doubt on Moorsom's ability and it was agreed that there would be a six-week delay while an eminent engineer reviewed the technical aspects of the proposed line. This was done by Joseph Locke, and his report on the technical aspects, including the Lickey Incline, was favourable.

The Cheltenham and Great Western Union Railway company had been short of money from the outset, chiefly due to its parliamentary battle won with a rival to reach Cheltenham. In November 1837 it made clear it its easternmost part (Swindon to Cirencester) took total priority. Thus its agreement to lay the line between Cheltenham and Gloucester, on which the B&GR depend had banked, was put back. The B&GR were alarmed by this; if the C&GWUR were to become insolvent and their powers lapsed, the B&GR had no powers to form the line themselves.

The C&GWUR had a bill before Parliament in the 1838 session, and it was mutually accepted that protective clauses for the B&GR could be inserted; power was given for the B&GR to build the line itself if the C&GWUR failed to do so by a date; each company would build and own one town station. The B&GR under these provisions soon built the line itself.

By August 1839 the Birmingham and Gloucester Railway had four locomotives, and 35 wagons had been delivered but an early opening that was anticipated was delayed by extremely bad weather. The directors joined the first public passenger journey on part of the route on 1 June 1840; involving two round trips.

== Opening of the line ==
The line was opened in stages; from Cheltenham to Bromsgrove was opened to the public without ceremony on 24 June 1840 for passenger traffic. On 17 September 1840 it was extended to a temporary terminus at Cofton Farm a little south of semi-rural Longbridge, south of Birmingham. The Cheltenham to Gloucester section was opened on 4 November 1840. On 17 December 1840 northern extension, to Camp Hill, opened which became the Birmingham terminus for a time, as very early planned.

The Tewkesbury branch opened on 21 July 1840. (Note: Christiansen remarks that "The historian John Norris believes it is likely the branch was completed much earlier, being used to convey materials for construction of the main line, delivered to Tewkesbury by river craft.) It was horse-operated until 1844; doubletrack was installed in 1864 in connection with the construction of the Malvern and Tewkesbury line.

The line was more widely linked, as agreed, by building then opening a junction with the London and Birmingham Railway beyond Camp Hill on 17 August 1841 when Camp Hill was relegated to a goods station and Curzon Street station became a major junction station and further operational route terminus. Goods traffic started on the line in April 1841.

One tunnel exists and was engineered for the line at Grovely Hill, near Bromsgrove; one-quarter mile (0.4 km) in length, lined in brick with no invert. The largest bridge is over the Avon at Eckington, Worcestershire, when built having three cast-iron segmental arches of 73-foot (22.3 m) span supported on two lines of iron columns.

The rails were Vignoles rail weighing 56 lb/yd (27.8 kg/m), laid on longitudinal sleepers, except on embankments over 15 feet (4.6 m) high where cross sleepers were used. The construction had cost £1,266,666.

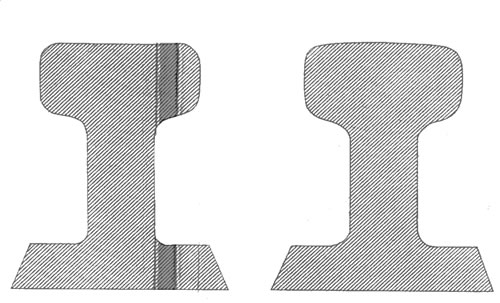
Vignoles rail as used for the Birmingham and Gloucester Railway in 1840

== Locomotives ==
Edward Bury, locomotive builder and superintendent of the London and Birmingham Railway, was engaged in 1838 as consultant for motive power, workshops and stationary engine for the Lickey Incline. He promptly organised the purchase of two second hand engines, the 0-4-0 Leicester and the 0-4-2 Southampton to assist in line construction and ordered four from George Forrester, the first two arriving in November.

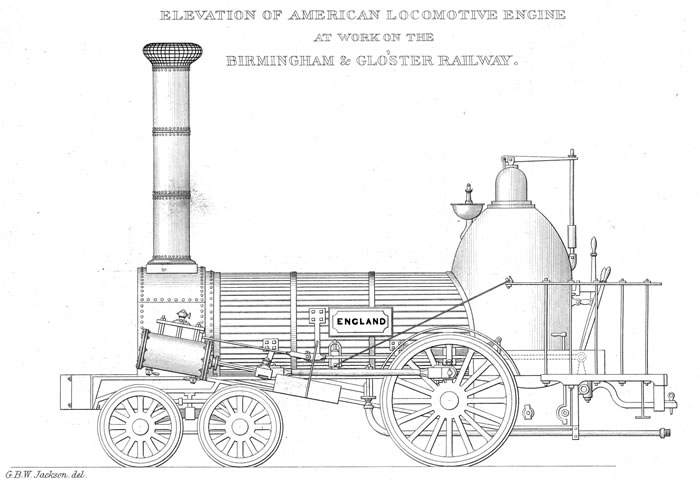
The "England" locomotive built by the Norris company

In 1838, during the construction period thought was being given once again to the working of the Lickey Incline by locomotives. Although Brunel, Robert Stephenson and Bury declared this to be impossible or advised against it. Captain Moorsom said that he had seen locomotives working similar gradients in the US, (Note: He is supposed to have seen a Norris locomotive climbing a 1 in 14 gradient, but later research suggests he merely saw a circular making that claim.) An order was placed with engine builders called Norris Locomotive Works in Philadelphia for a number of 4-2-0 locomotives. (Note: It is remarkable that in a situation where tractive force was crucial, and dependent on adhesion weight, that a 4-2-0 design was favoured over an 0-6-0. ... P.C. Dewhurst investigated the Norris claims of "hill-climbing" feats and found the substantially true, the draw bar to the tender tending to transfer some weight under load to the rear wheels, and also suggesting the boiler pressure was run at nearer 90psi compared to the advertised 55psi to get the performance. The B&GR bankers attached to the front of the train as a pilot which leveraged the former hill climbing feature rather than pushing from the rear which would lose this advantage. Trials of the Class A extra Philadelphia against Bury's 0-4-0 No. 65 resulted total failure for the latter; Awdry suggesting sustained steam raising may have been the issue there.) The key requirement for the B&GR was for three 12 ton Class A Extra locomotives to assist trains up the Lickey Incline, but astute and possibly duplicitous salesmanship by the Norris team resulted in additional sales of seven Class B and three Class A of eight and ten tons respectively.

After the initial deliberations about engines fit for the Lickey incline, several American engines were obtained. (Note: Sources differ about the number and the timing of the orders. At the February 1839 shareholders' meeting it was stated that ten locomotives had been ordered from Norris of Philadelphia. Captain Moorsom explained that one such machine was to be tried upon the Lickey Inclined Plane by way of experiment, and at the manufacturer's own risk and expense. Subject to these conditions, a provisional order would possibly be placed with Norris for ten or a dozen machines.) The prototype Norris engine was described as a Class A Extra locomotive, supposedly capable of taking 75 long tons (76 tonnes) up the Lickey incline at 10 to 15 mph (15 to 25 km/h). Three more of these were ordered. Norris's British agent persuaded the B&GR to purchase smaller "Class B" locomotives, and the prototype, England, was trialled on the Grand Junction Railway (as the B&GR was not ready) in March 1839, and found to be non-compliant with the specification as to load haulage. Undeterred, the B&GR purchased six of the class B engines. A Class A Extra locomotive, Philadelphia, was delivered at the end of May 1840; it had a sandbox and water tub "for wetting the rails to improve adhesion". In a trial on the uncompleted Lickey incline, it performed better than a Bury locomotive, taking 24 tons up at 15 mph (25 km/h).

However Rake comments that, "The American locomotives were, however, afterwards superseded, as it was found that an ordinary tank engine, assisted by a pilot, worked the traffic in a perfectly satisfactory manner." Moreover, the fireboxes and boiler tubes were iron, and soon had to be replaced with brass fittings.

On opening there were four locomotives built by Forrester; they were named Cheltenham, Worcester, Bromsgrove and Tewkesbury. They had 5 ft 6 in (1,676 mm) driving wheels. There were four of the American 4-2-0 locomotives, which had 4 ft (1,219 mm) driving wheels. The four non-driven wheels were mounted on a bogie. They were named Philadelphia, England, Columbia, and Atlantic. In addition there were four ballast engines.

== Early business performance ==
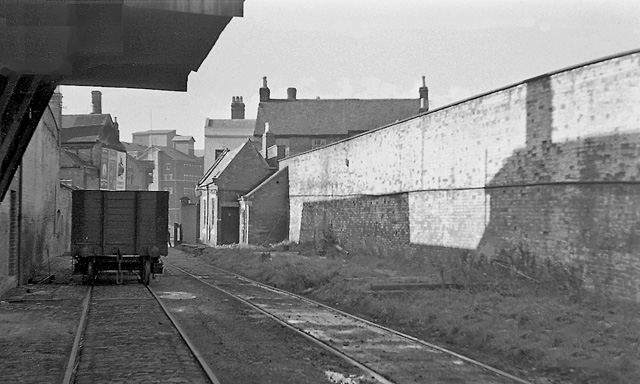
Site of the 1840 Tewkesbury station

Night mail trains started running from 6 February 1841, by contract to the Postmaster General.

In 1842 the strained UK economy witnessed a massive fall in passenger carryings which continued in 1843. This cut or delayed B&GR outlay due to investor confidence.

The Bristol and Gloucester Railway opened on 8 July 1844. The fact of a through rail route between Birmingham and Bristol, albeit for the time being with a break of gauge at Gloucester, heralded the decades of busy goods traffic.

The Bristol and Gloucester Railway and the Birmingham and Gloucester Railway obviously had a mutual interest, and discussions took place over the amalgamation of the two companies. This was "agreed" on 14 January 1845 but Parliament made way for other Bills to be scheduled (it failed Standing Orders). The two worked in informal collaboration.

== Tewkesbury ==
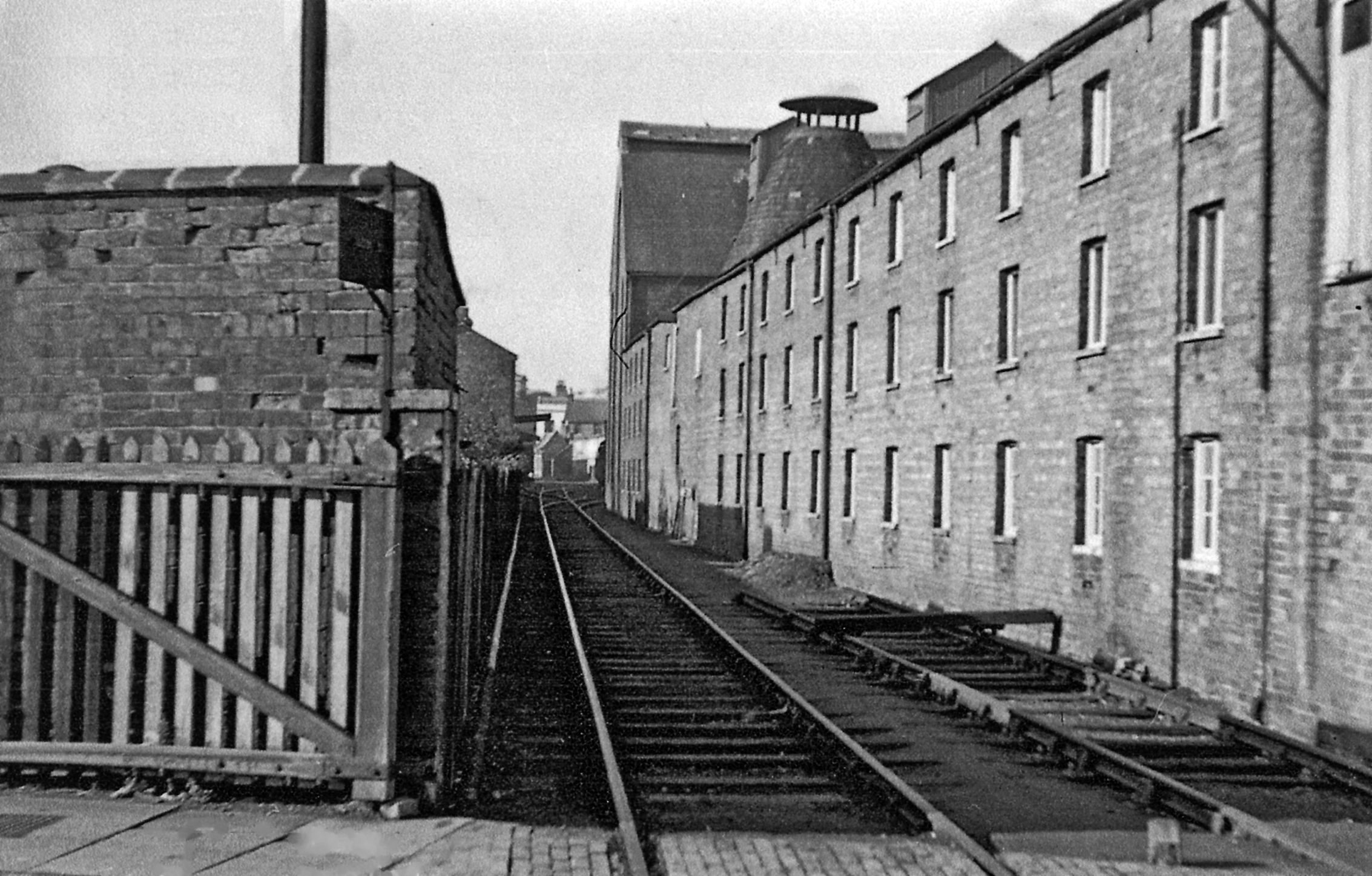
Tewkesbury Quay branch in 1951

A contemporary description of the station mentions that "the front elevation is 38 feet wide, and at the back is a raised platform 133 feet by 12 feet 6 inches covered by a substantial roof with glass lights on each side. The roof measures 166 feet long by 32 feet wide".

== Bristol and Gloucester Railway ==
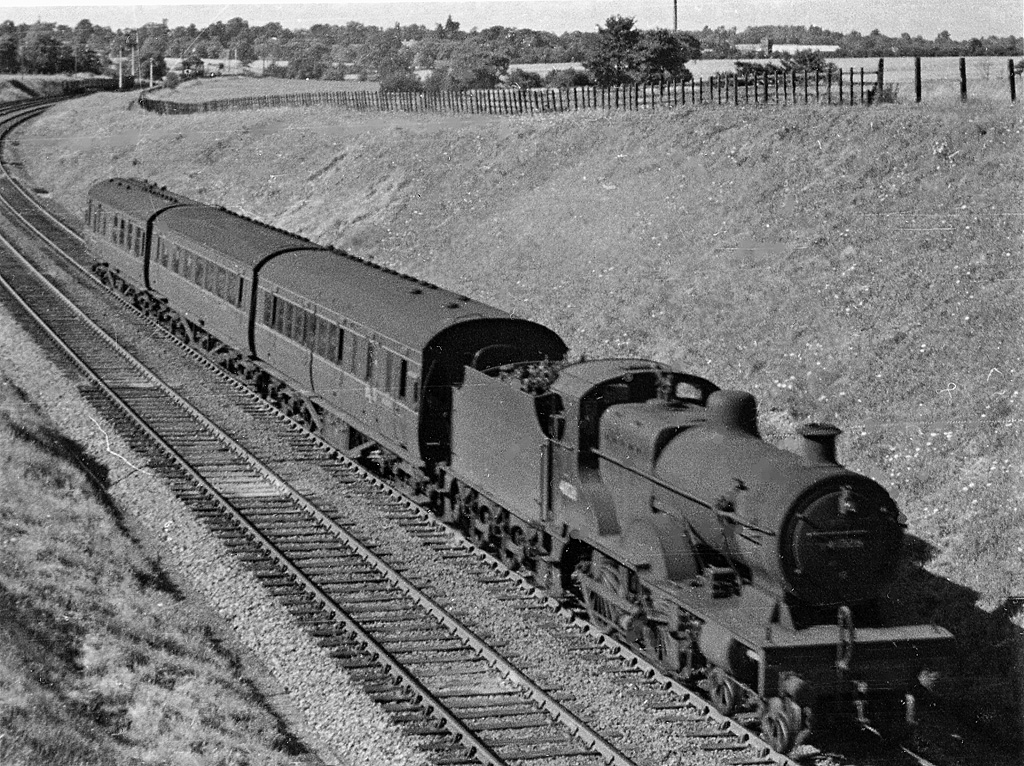
Down stopping train a short distance south of Abbotswood Junction in 1950

In 1839 the Bristol and Gloucester Railway had been authorised. It was conceived as a narrow (standard) gauge railway between a terminal in Bristol and Standish Junction, where it would make use of the Cheltenham and Great Western Union Railway into Gloucester. The company noted as it would operate between the GWR at Bristol and at Standish (both crossing/ending on the broad gauge) it should make its line on the broad gauge, and this enabled it to use the GWR Temple Meads station at Bristol, and simplified the section between Standish and Gloucester, which otherwise would have needed to be built allowing mixed (dual) gauge.

The Bristol and Gloucester Railway opened for passenger traffic on 6 July 1844; it used a platform, intended for the C&GWUR, on the north side of the Birmingham and Gloucester Railway station there; the two lines crossed on the immediate approach to the stations.

== Absorption by the Midland Railway ==
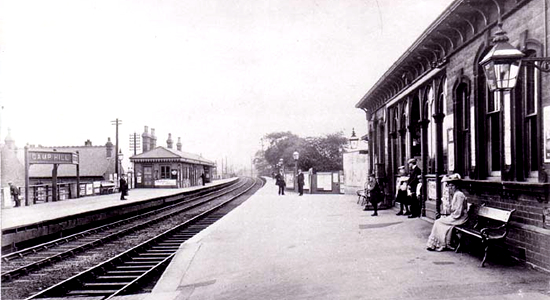
Camp Hill station

On 24 January 1845 the Great Western Railway offered to buy the two companies; this would have resulted in the broad gauge being extended to Birmingham; and was declined. John Ellis of the Midland Railway encountered Edward Sturge and Joseph Gibbons while they were travelling to a second meeting with the GWR on 26 January. Ellis saw the opportunity and offered that his company would purchase the Gloucester companies, and offered to raise and spend 6% on their (own) capital of £1.8 million if discussions with the GWR were inconclusive. The GWR declined to increase their offer, and the Gloucester companies turned back to Ellis.

The company granted the Midland's solicitor Samual Carter a perpetual lease giving the right to purchase. The matter was ratified in Parliament in the 1846 session, and on 3 August 1846 the amalgamation Bill was passed.

The London and North Western Railway was as anxious to keep the broad gauge away from Birmingham as was the Midland Railway, and it undertook to share any loss the MR might make by the acquisition; this was later commuted into permission to use the LNWR New Street station (built later) in Birmingham for a nominal rental of £100 per annum.

The corporate buyout, dragged out the break of gauge at Gloucester. The disruption caused by the process of transferring goods from narrow (standard) gauge wagons to broad gauge influenced the Gauge Commission, who at the time were deliberating on recommendations to Parliament about the standardisation of the gauge in Great Britain. Of more immediate concern, the Midland Railway obtained authorisation by Act of 14 August 1848 to lay an independent narrow gauge track between Gloucester and Standish Junction (where the Cheltenham and Great Western Union Railway diverged), and to mix the gauge between Standish and Bristol. They ran their first narrow gauge train throughout on 29 May 1854.

Further Norris locomotives were purchased, but they were crudely constructed and early replacement of fireboxes proved to be necessary. From February 1842 several were progressively converted to tank engines.

== Worcester ==
The Birmingham and Gloucester Railway had, from the outset, implied a willingness to serve Worcester to respond to an outcry from the city over being bypassed. MPs and Peers objected to such a branch who had interests in or lobbying from its canals, the stagecoach sector and rival railways so that the early authorising Acts left such plans out.

The Oxford, Worcester and Wolverhampton Railway had been authorised on 4 August 1845; it was to be a broad gauge line, allied to the Great Western Railway. A national financial recession resulted in waylaid construction. Meanwhile, the Midland Railway was anxious to reach Worcester, and the two companies reached an agreement to lay narrow (standard) gauge track between a junction at Abbots Wood (Abbotswood) (on the B&GR main line) and Shrub Hill, a station for Worcester. The Midland Railway started operating a train service on 5 October 1850. There were five daily trains to Bristol and six to Birmingham; the Birmingham trains reversed at Abbots Wood Junction.

Gough reports:

The Midland worked the service on the short section between Abbot's Wood Jcn and Worcester from its commencement. When the loop to Stoke Works Jcn was completed the company began to divide its passenger trains and run one section direct and one via Worcester. The trains separated and rejoined at the two junctions. By 1855 the service on the original line consisted of two trains in each direction between Bromsgrove and Abbot's Wood, making connections with trains running via the loop. From 1 October 1855 these services were withdrawn, and all regular passenger trains ran via Worcester. Goods trains and excursion traffic continued to run via Dunhampstead [the original main line]. The Dunhampstead line was re-opened for regular traffic on 1 June 1880 to allow some through trains to by-pass Worcester, but the intermediate stations were not re-opened for passenger traffic.

== The Direct Line at Landor Street Junction ==
The Midland Railway had been formed by the amalgamation of the Birmingham and Derby Junction Railway with others. Both the B&DJR and the B&GR line turned westward to Curzon Street station and Landor Street, and in 1862 the Midland Railway obtained powers to construct a direct line between the two networks.

This was opened in the first half of 1864. From that time express passenger trains were run between Derby and Bristol over the direct line. Portions for Birmingham New Street station, by now opened as the main central station for the Midland Railway, were detached or attached at Saltley and Camp Hill.

== Birmingham West Suburban Railway ==
On 3 April 1876 the Birmingham West Suburban Railway was opened, as a single line from the Midland Railway at Lifford to Granville Street canal wharf, near the centre of Birmingham. It was worked by the Midland Railway, who later acquired it. The line was intended as a suburban passenger line. A connection was made at Lifford to Kings Norton on the Birmingham and Gloucester main line, and the passenger trains from Granville Street ran to that place.

In 1881 an Act authorised an extension north-eastwards, so as to connect to New Street station in Birmingham. This was opened in 1885 and from that time express passenger trains between Bristol and Birmingham used the West Suburban line. This had the added advantage of entering New Street station from the west, enabling forward running on to the Midland Railway's Derby line without reversal. As a result, the stretch between Kings Norton and New Street effectively became a branch line, becoming known as the Camp Hill line.

== Lifford Curve ==
In 1892 a curve was installed at Lifford forming the third side of a triangle there, and enabling circular suburban passenger train operation.

== Lickey bank engines ==
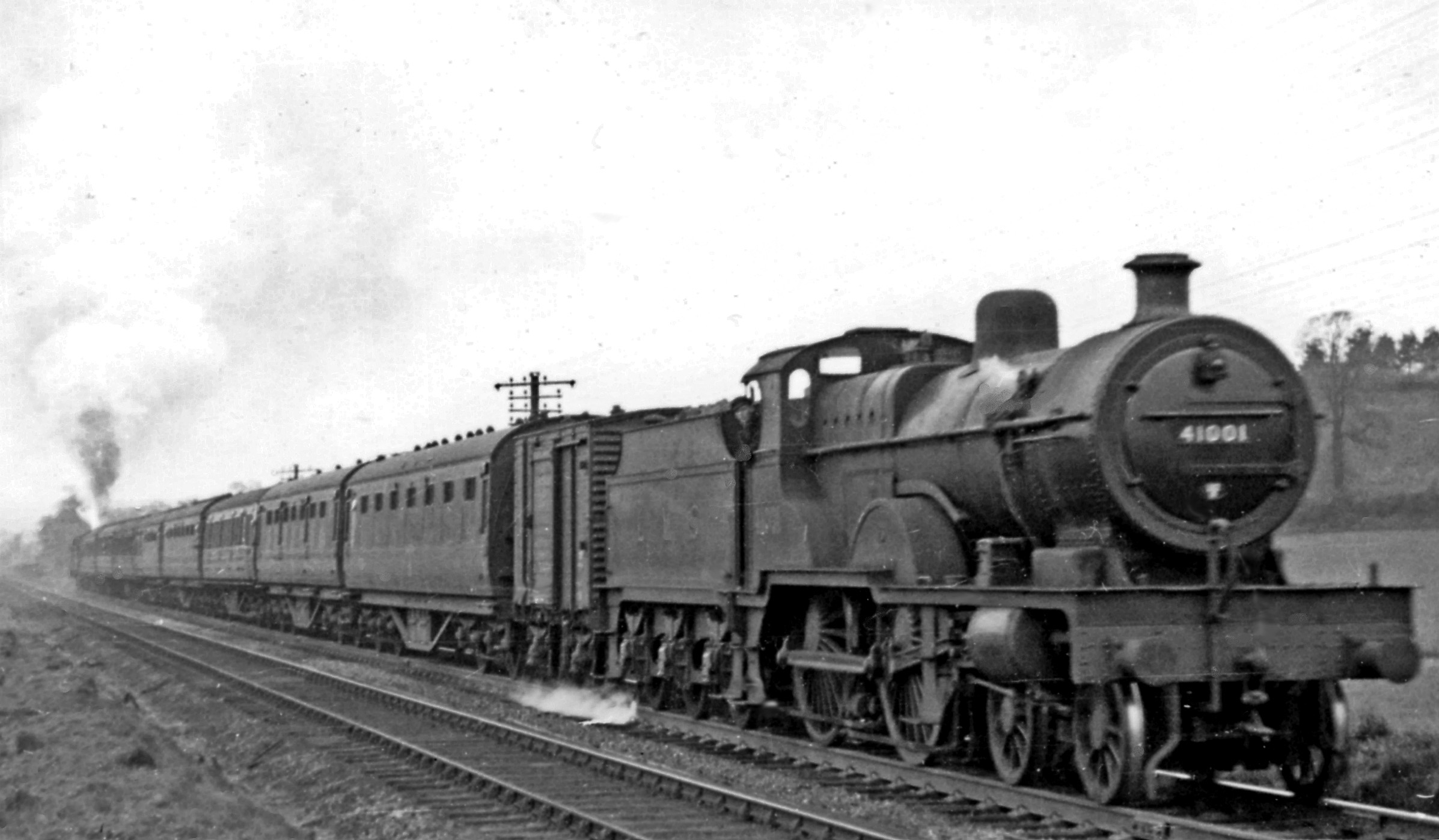
A train ascending the Lickey Incline, assisted in rear by a banking engine

Banking on the Lickey incline remained an operational inconvenience throughout the years of steam traction. In 1920 a four cylinder 0-10-0 locomotive was built specially of the purpose; no 2290, it was known informally as Big Bertha, in association with the German heavy howitzer used during World War I. An electric headlight was provided on the engine to assist in closing up to the rear of a goods train in the hours of darkness

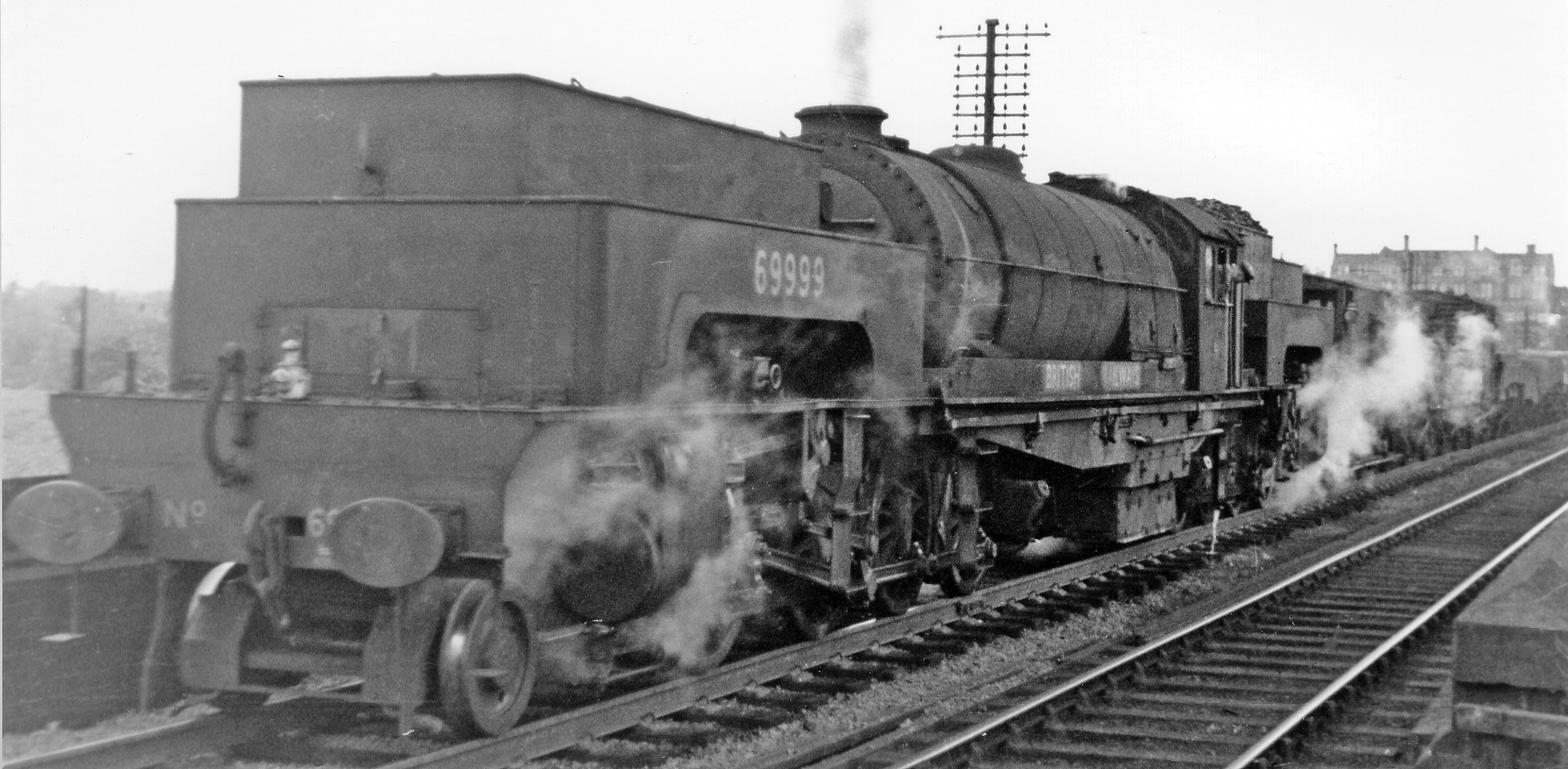
The LNER Garratt locomotive

Later, while no. 2290 was being overhauled, an LMS 2-6-0+0-6-2 Garratt design of engine, no 4998, was used and later an LNER 2-8-0+0-8-2 Garratt, class U1, no 69999 was used in 1949.

== Intermediate stations near Birmingham ==
During World War II intermediate stations between Kings Norton and Birmingham on the original Birmingham and Gloucester alignment were closed as an economy measure, in 1941. After the end of the war, there appeared to be little public pressure to reopen them, and they remained closed.

== From 1923 ==
A the start of 1923 most of the railways of Great Britain were restructured into four large concerns, a change mandated by the Railways Act 1921. The Midland Railway as a constituent of the new London, Midland and Scottish Railway, (LMS).

== Nationalisation ==
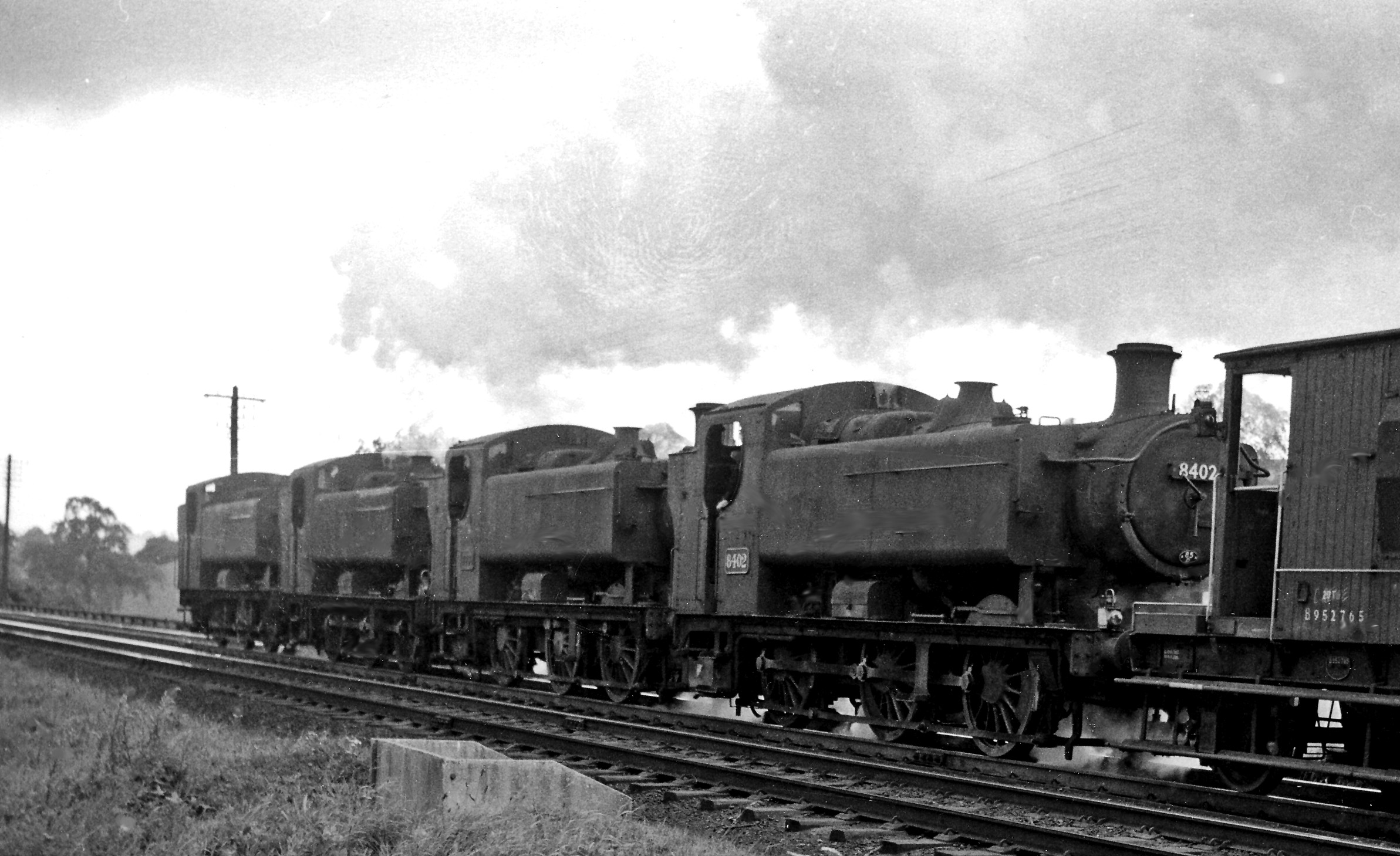
Four bank engines pushing a heavy freight train up the Lickey Incline

In 1948 the railways were taken into national ownership under British Railways.

== Concentration from alternative routes ==
Extract from the more extreme Beeching cut proposals, partially executed; the Honeybourne Line to the right (northeast) of Gloucester shut.

Still in the early 1960s three routes vied as those for freight between two groups of areas: a) South West England and South Wales and b) England's West Midlands and North West: the above described main line, the "Lickey route", the via Honeybourne and Stratford and (in the case of South Wales only) the via Hereford and Worcester, or Shrewsbury. The backbone, Lickey route, carried the heaviest traffic by a moderate margin. The second line overlapped on the use of an east-of-Gloucester stretch of track for the onward link to South Wales; the third was principally Welsh-related and would be circuitous and involve the Great Western's Severn Tunnel for the South West of England. Concentration and rationalisation were sought at the time. Diesel traction had rendered the Lickey incline a negligible problem so it was declared the general freight route from Spring 1965; heavy through freight shifted away from the Honeybourne route.

== The present day ==
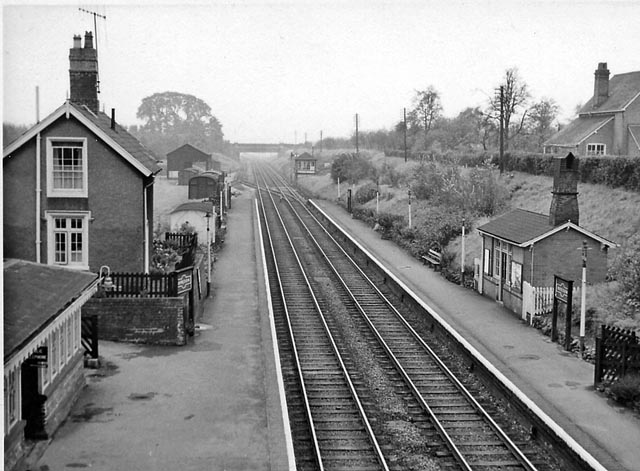
View southward of Bredon railway station towards Cheltenham in 1960.

The line is an important part of the British railway network, forming a section of the Bristol to Birmingham main line.

Frequent long-distance passenger services operate by CrossCountry, part of Arriva UK Trains. The line is also an important freight route. West Midlands Trains operate the local passenger service from Hereford to Birmingham New Street, which uses the line only closer to the latter (Stoke Works Junction to Kings Norton).

A brief corollary known as former Birmingham West Suburban Railway is used by the majority of Birmingham New Street passenger trains; a few through trains use the original Camp Hill route for convenience in approaching or leaving that hub station at the east end rather than the west.

Most of the freight traffic uses the Camp Hill route, which gives quick connectivity to the national network at Saltley.

The Tewkesbury branch closed in 1961 to passengers and completely in 1964.

== Accidents and incidents ==
On 10 November 1840, the boiler of locomotive Surprise exploded at Bromsgrove. Two people were killed.

On 26 June 1845, a passenger train from Gloucester, hauled by one of the Philadelphian engines, ran head-on into a slow-moving "heavy, powerful" goods engine which was crossing the line from a siding, via a diamond crossing, at Camp Hill, Birmingham. The driver of the Gloucester train was badly hurt after jumping from his engine. Some passengers suffered minor injuries, mostly from flying glass. Both engines suffered only minor damage. The driver of the goods engine, John Garvie, was deemed at fault, but was discharged by magistrates on the grounds of previous good character. For the same reason the company demoted him to non-driving duties, rather than dismissing him.

== Topography ==
- Gloucester; opened 4 November 1840; closed 12 April 1896;
- Churchdown; opened August 1842; closed September 1842; reopened 2 February 1874; closed 2 November 1964;
- Badgworth; opened 22 August 1843; closed October 1846;
- Hatherley Junction; divergence of curve to Banbury line (1906–1956);
- Lansdown Junction; convergence of Banbury and Cheltenham Direct line (1881–1962); divergence of GWR line to St James station (1847 – 1966);
- Cheltenham; opened 24 June 1840; sometimes known as Cheltenham Spa Lansdown; still open;
- Cheltenham High Street; opened 1 September 1862; closed 1 July 1910
- Swindon (Gloucestershire); opened 26 May 1842; closed 1 October 1844;
- Cleeve; opened 14 February 1843; closed 20 February 1950;
- Ashchurch; opened 24 June 1840; closed 15 November 1971; reopened 2 June 1997; still open; divergence of Tewkesbury branch (1840 – 1964); divergence of line to Evesham (1864–1963);
- Ashchurch flat crossing (1864–1957);
- Bredon; opened 24 June 1840; closed 4 January 1965;
- Eckington; opened 24 June 1840; closed 4 January 1965;
- Defford; opened 24 June 1840; closed 4 January 1965;
- Besford; opened November 1841; closed after August 1846;
- Pirton or Kempsey; opened November 1841; closed November 1844;
- Wadborough; opened November 1841; closed 4 January 1965;
- Worcester Junction; opened November 1850; renamed Abbot's Wood Junction March 1852; closed 1 October 1855;
- Abbotswood Junction; divergence of spur towards Worcester (1850 -);
- Norton; opened November 1841; closed August 1846;
- Spetchley; opened 24 June 1840; closed 1 October 1855;
- Bredicot; opened November 1845; closed 1 October 1855;
- Oddingley; opened September 1845; closed 1 October 1855;
- Dunhampstead; opened November 1841; closed 1 October 1855;
- Droitwich; opened 24 June 1840; renamed Droitwich Road 1852; closed 1 October 1855;
- Dodderhill; opened November 1841; closed 5 March 1844;
- Stoke; opened about September 1840; soon renamed Stoke Works; closed 1 October 1855;
- Stoke Works Junction; convergence of line from Droitwich Spa (1852 -);
- Bromsgrove; opened 24 June 1840; still open;
- Lickey Incline;
- Blackwell; opened 5 June 1841; closed 18 April 1966;
- Barnt Green; opened 1 May 1844; still open; convergence of Redditch branch (1859–);
- Croft Farm; opened 17 September 1840; closed 17 December 1840;
- Cofton; opened 17 October 1840 as temporary northern terminus; closed 17 December 1840; reopened November 1841; closed December 1843
- Longbridge; opened November 1841; close 1 May 1849; reopened 1918; closed by 1927; reopened 8 May 1978; still open; convergence of Halesowen Railway (1883 – 1964);
- Northfield; opened 1 September 1870; still open;
- King's Norton; opened 1 May 1849; still open; divergence of West Suburban Line (1885 -); divergence of dive under to West Suburban Line (1876 – 1967);
- Lifford East Junction; convergence of Lifford curve;
- Lifford; opened ?; closed November 1844; reopened 28 September 1885; closed 30 September 1940;
- Hazelwell; opened 1 January 1903; closed 27 January 1941;
- Moseley; opened November 1841; renamed King's Heath 1 November 1867; closed 27 January 1941;
- Moseley; opened 1 November 1867; closed 27 January 1941;
- Brighton Road; opened 1 November 1875; closed 27 January 1941;
- Camp Hill; opened by December 1844; renamed Camp Hill and Balsall Heath December 1867; renamed Camp Hill 1 April 1904; closed 27 January 1941; divergence of connecting line to London and Birmingham Railway (1841 -);
- Camp Hill; opened 17 December 1840; closed 17 August 1841; closed to goods traffic 1970.

=== Connecting line to London and Birmingham Railway ===
- Camp Hill (second station); above;
- Bordesley Junction; convergence of joint line from GWR (1861–);
- St Andrews Junction; divergence of connecting line to Birmingham and Derby Junction line, (1866–);
- Gloucester Junction with London and Birmingham Railway.

=== Connecting line to Birmingham and Derby Junction Railway ===
- St Andrews Junction; above;
- Landor Street Junction; convergence with Birmingham and Derby Junction Railway.

=== Tewkesbury branch ===
- Ashchurch (above);
- Tewkesbury Junction; convergence of line from |Evesham (1864 to 1957);
- (Junction; divergence of Tewkesbury and Malvern Railway (1864 to 1963);
- Tewkesbury; opened 21 July 1840; closed and transferred to Malvern line 16 May 1864;
- Tewkesbury Quay.

== See also ==
- B. Hick and Sons
- James McConnell
- Nasmyth, Gaskell and Company
