= Darby (surname) =

Darby is a surname, and may refer to:

== A ==
- Abiah Darby (1716–1794), English Quaker minister
- Abraham Darby I (1678–1717), British ironmaster and pioneer of coke-fired smelting
- Abraham Darby II (1711–1763), British ironmaster, son of Abraham I
- Abraham Darby III (1750–1791), British ironmaster, builder of the world's first iron bridge
- Abraham Darby IV (1804–1878), British ironmaster
- Adrian Darby (born 1937), British environmentalist
- Al Darby (born 1954), American football player
- Alden Darby (born 1992), Canadian football player
- Angie Darby (born 1987), Australian modern pentathlete
- Anthony Darby (born 1972), Australian footballer
- Arthur Darby (1876–1960), British rugby union footballer
- Ashley Darby (born 1988), American reality television personality and singer

== B ==
- Brandon Darby (born 1976), American blogger and activist
- Brent Darby (1981–2011), American basketball player
- Brett Darby (born 1983), English footballer
- Byron Darby (born 1960), American football player

== C ==
- Chad Darby (born 1981), American musician
- Chris Darby (born 1950s), New Zealand politician in Auckland
- Christopher Darby Griffith (1804–1885), British Member of parliament for Devizes
- Chuck Darby (born 1975), American football player
- Clifford Darby (1909–1992), Welsh historical geographer and academic
- Craig Darby (born 1972), American ice hockey player

== D ==
- Deborah Darby (1754–1810), British Quaker minister
- Dick Darby (1919–1993), British Bishop of Sherwood
- Douglas Darby (1910–1985), Australian politician
- Drew Darby (born 1947), American politician from Texas
- Duane Darby (born 1973), English footballer

== E ==
- Edward Darby (1888–?), British World War I flying ace
- Eileen Darby (1916–2004), American photographer of Broadway theatre productions
- Ezra Darby (1768–1808), American politician from New Jersey

== F ==
- Frank Darby (born 1997), American football player

== G ==
- Geoffrey Darby (born 1953) is a Canadian media executive, television producer and director
- George Darby (c.1720–1790), Anglo-Irish vice-admiral in the British Royal Navy
- George Darby (baseball) (1869–1937), American baseball player
- George Darby (MP for East Sussex) (1798–1877), British Conservative politician
- George Darby (politician) (1798–1877), British politician

== H ==
- Harry Darby (1895–1987), American politician from Kansas
- Harry Darby (wrestler) (1902–1971), British wrestler
- Henry Darby (politician) (1754–1818), Irish politician
- Henry D'Esterre Darby (1750–1823), Anglo-Irish admiral in the British Royal Navy
- Hugo Darby (born 1993), English cricketer

== J ==
- James Darby (1865–1943), English cricketer
- Jeannie Darby, American engineer and academic
- Joe Darby (born c.1979), American military policeman and whistleblower
- John Darby (Dean of Chester) (1831–1919), English Anglican cleric
- John Darby (NASCAR official), American NASCAR Cup Series race director
- John Fletcher Darby (1803–1882), American politician from Missouri
- John M. Darby (1804–1877), American botanist and academic
- John Nelson Darby (1800–1882), British leader of the Plymouth Brethren
- John Darby (printer) (died 1704), English printer
- Joseph Darby (jumper) (1861–1937), English jumper
- Julian Darby (born 1967), English footballer and coach
- J. N. Darby, a pen-name of American juvenile fiction writer Christine N. Govan (1897–1985)
- J. N. Darby, a pen-name of American author and naturalist Mary Q. Steele (1922–1992)

== K ==
- Kate Darby (born 1990), Australian rules footballer
- Ken Darby (1909–1992), American composer, lyricist and conductor
- Kenneth Darby (born 1982), American football player
- Kim Darby (born 1947), American actress

== M ==
- Marie Darby (1940–2019), New Zealand marine biologist
- Mark Darby (born 1959), British airline executive
- Mary Darby, later Mary Robinson (poet) (1757–1800), English actress and writer
- Matt Darby (American football) (born 1968), American football player
- Matthew Darby (born 1967), British conservationist and publisher
- Matthew Darby-Griffith (1772–1823), British major-general
- Mike Darby (1942–2012), Australian rules footballer
- Mildred Darby (1867–1932), Anglo-Irish novelist

== N ==
- Newman Darby (1928–2016), American inventor of the sailboard

== P ==
- Paul Darby (born 1956), American football player
- Paul Darby-Dowman (born 1977), British canoe sprinter
- Peter Darby (1938–2022), Irish Gaelic footballer and hurler
- Phelps Darby (1881–1957), American basketball player and coach

== R ==
- Raymond V. Darby (1896–1953), American politician from Los Angeles
- Rhys Darby (born 1974), New Zealand comedian and actor
- Richard Darby (born 1958), American attorney and judge
- Ronald Darby (born 1994), American football player

== S ==
- Sarah Darby, British medical statistician
- Séamus Darby (born 1950), Irish Gaelic footballer
- Simon Darby (born 1964), British politician
- Stephen Darby (born 1988), English footballer
- Steve Darby (born 1955), English football player, coach and pundit

== T ==
- Tandy Darby (born 1973), American politician from Tennessee
- Teddy Darby (1906–1975), American blues singer and guitarist
- Thomas Darby, inventor of the Darby Steam-Digger
- Tom Darby, half of the country music duo Darby and Tarlton

== W ==
- Will Darby, American politician
- William Darby (priest) (died 1791), Anglican Archdeacon in Ireland
- William Darby, stage name Pablo Fanque (1810–1871), British equestrian performer and circus proprietor
- William J. Darby (1913–2001), American physician and nutrition scientist
- William Orlando Darby (1911–1945), American Army officer, commander of Darby's Rangers

== See also ==
- Derby (surname)
