= Aynuk and Ayli =

Mythical characters from the Black Country, England

Aynuk and Ayli are two mythical characters from the Black Country that figure in a large number of local jokes. Their names are literal, phonetical translations of the names Enoch and Eli into the Black Country accent. They also appeared as a cartoon strip in the Express & Star.

Aynuk and Ayli were personified by a comedy duo consisting of John Plant (7 December 1951 – 21 November 2006) and Alan Smith (1937 – 22 March 2022). They performed across central England from 1984.

They were also employed on at least one occasion by an NHS trust to help medical staff from overseas become accustomed to the Black Country accent.

Plant died in November 2006 after a short illness, two weeks before what would have been his 55th birthday. He was buried in St Andrew's church near his lifelong home in Netherton, near Dudley.
