= The History of the Rebellion =

1702–04 account of the English civil war by Edward Hyde, 1st Earl Clarendon

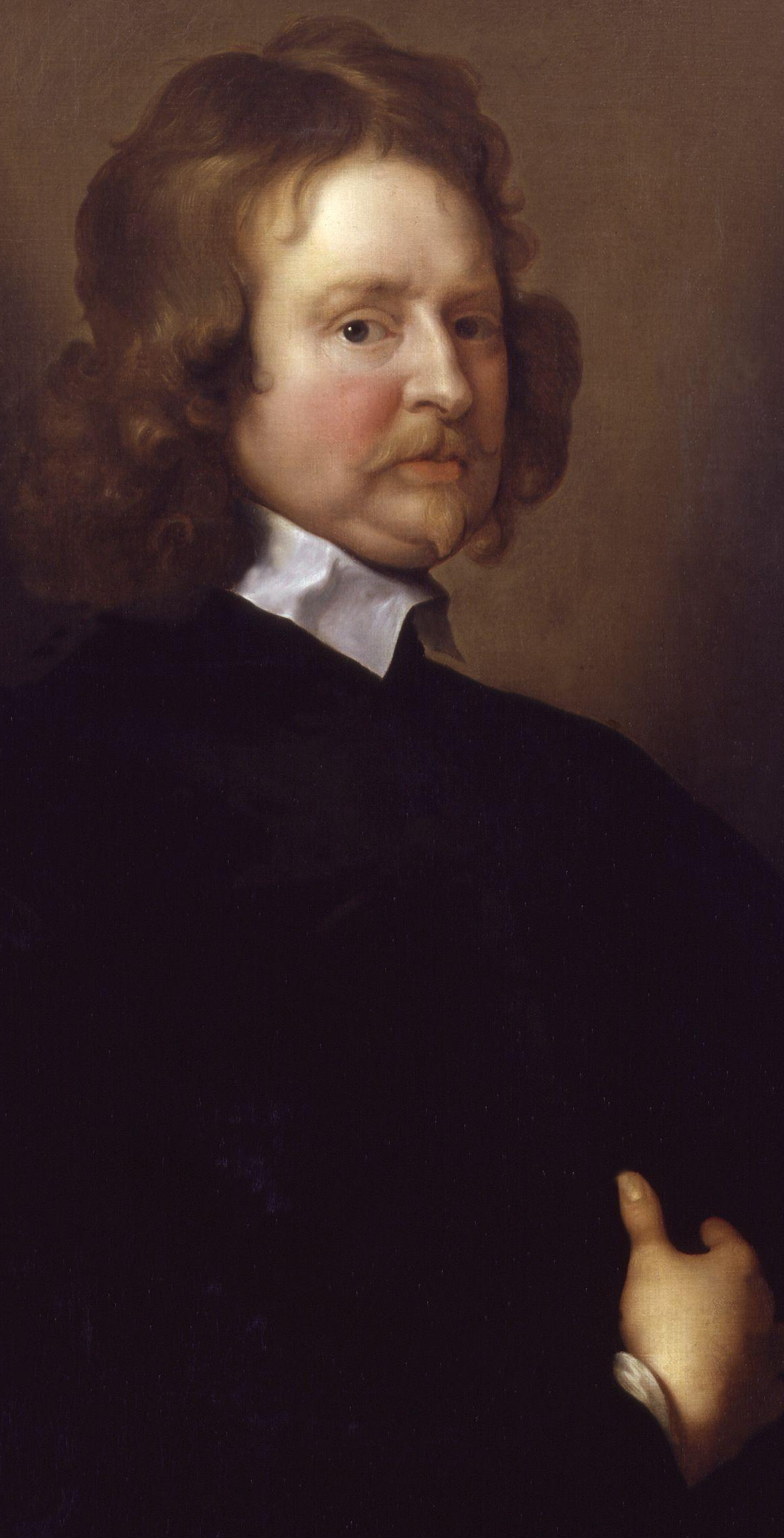
Edward Hyde, 1st Earl of Clarendon, circa 1648–1655. Portrait by Adriaen Hanneman (d. 1671), National Portrait Gallery, London, no 773

The History of the Rebellion by Edward Hyde, 1st Earl of Clarendon and former advisor to Charles I and Charles II, is his account of the Wars of the Three Kingdoms. Originally published between 1702 and 1704 as The History of the Rebellion and Civil Wars in England, it was the first detailed account from a key player in the events it covered.

Clarendon wrote the original History between 1646 and 1648, which only recorded events up to March 1644. After his banishment, he wrote his autobiographical Life between 1668 and 1670. In 1671 he then revised the History by incorporating the Life into it and writing new sections covering events after March 1644. The History is influenced by Clarendon's politics and his personal views of the Royalist strategy. His descriptions of the participants in political events are insightful and reveal his efforts to write a history that can instruct future readers on his views of appropriate state craft.

== Background and contents ==
Clarendon wrote the original History between 1646 and 1648, which only recorded events up to March 1644. After his banishment, he wrote his autobiographical Life between 1668 and 1670. In 1671 he then revised the History by incorporating the Life into it and writing new sections covering events after March 1644.

The title itself reflects the contemporary dispute over the nature and origins of the war. For Parliamentarians, the conflict was an attempt to restore the political balance between king and Parliament disrupted by the 1629 to 1640 Personal Rule. Royalists considered it an unlawful rebellion against their sovereign; in 1669, diarist and naval civil servant Samuel Pepys was asked by Duke of York to change a reference to "the late disruption between king and Parliament" to 'rebellion".

The History is influenced by Clarendon's politics and subtly supports his own views of Royalist strategy. For example, he opposed those Royalists in Paris headed by Queen Henrietta Maria of France, who urged Charles to agree to compromises over the Church of England to win support from the Presbyterian Scots Covenanters against Parliament. Clarendon argued that in so doing, Charles' advisers were destroying the cause for which they were fighting. He denigrates the logic for accepting such compromise by attributing widespread support for Puritan reforms to the church as simple disaffection by a wicked faction. While his descriptions of the participants are often insightful, they can also be heavily biased.

== Reception ==
The original publication of the History was sparked by the sensational success of Republican exile Edmund Ludlow's Memoirs in 1698–1699, which led to a spate of Civil War memoirs from the Whig perspective, especially from the printer John Darby. The Tories responded in 1701 with those of the Royalist Sir Philip Warwick, followed in 1702 by those of Sir Thomas Herbert and the first volume of Clarendon's History.

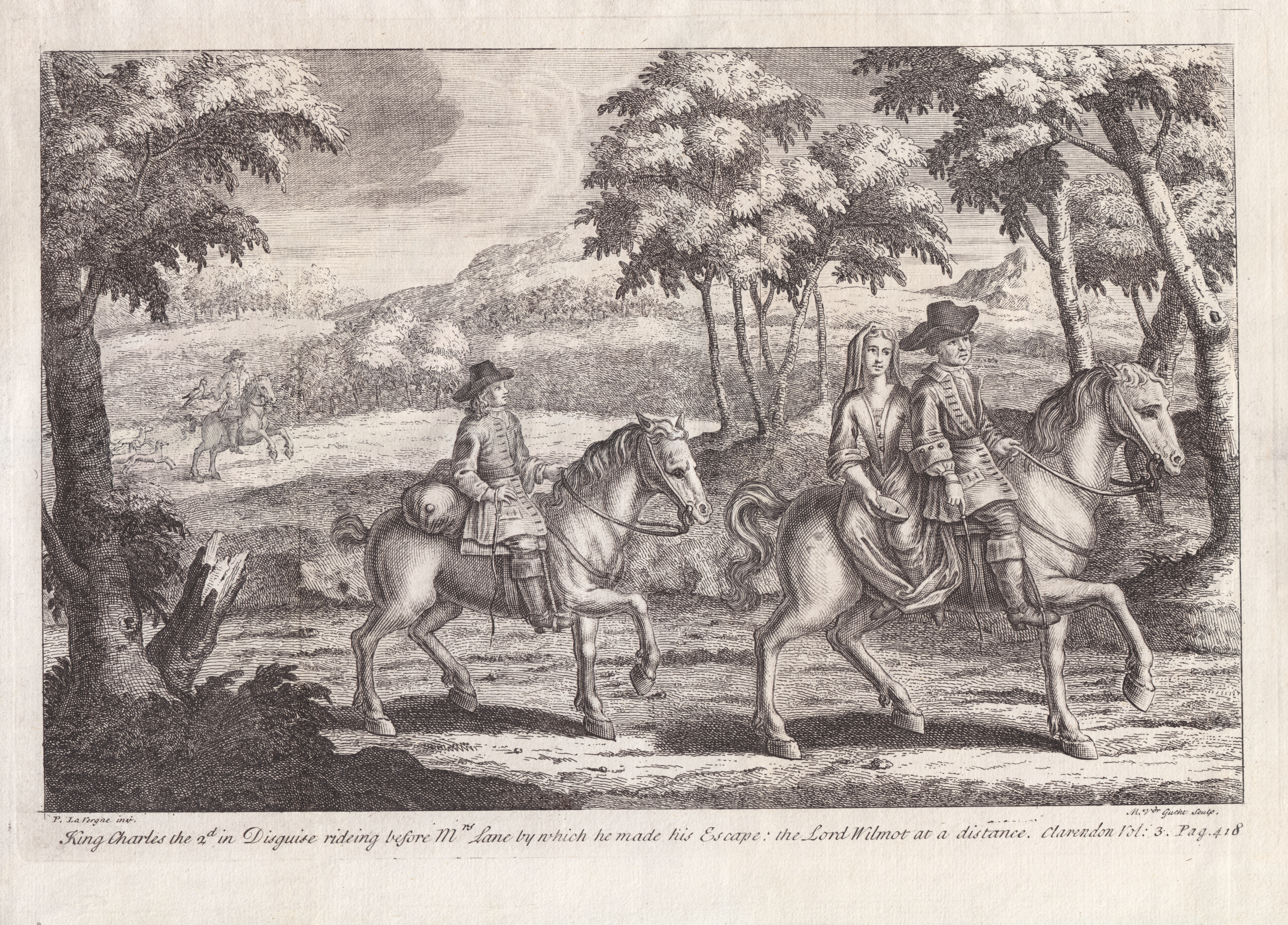
King Charles the 2d in Disguise rideing before Mrs Lane by which he made his Escape; the Lord Wilmot at a distance. Clarendon Vol: 3. Pag. 418.

In the preface to the first volume of his father's work, Laurence Hyde referred to his time as "an age when so many memoirs, narratives, and pieces of history come out as it were on purpose to justify the taking up arms against that king, and to blacken, revile, and ridicule the sacred majesty of an anointed head in distress; and when so much of the sense of religion to God, and of allegiance and duty to the crown is so defaced".

The second volume was published during the 1702 Tory push for the Occasional Conformity Bill that sought to undermine the Whigs by barring Nonconformists from office. This allowed individuals to comply with the Test Acts by attending Church of England service once or twice a year, a practice that persisted in both England and Ireland well into the mid-18th century. In the preface addressed to his niece Queen Anne, Laurence Hyde warned the "Monarchy of England is not now capable of being supported but upon the principles of the Church of England". Like his father before him, he claimed the Dissenters were simply the latest "propagation of the rebellious principles of the last age". He went on to suggest that only by adhering to the Tories could she avoid the same fate as her grandfather Charles I.

On 21 October 1703, Anne wrote to her friend, Sarah, Duchess of Marlborough;

Sir B. Bathurst sent me Ld Clarendons history last week, but haveing not quite made an end of ye first part, I did not unpack it, but I shall have that Curiosety now, to See this extraordinary dedication, which I should never have looked for in ye Second part of a book, & me thinks it is very wonderfull that people that dont want sense in some things, should be soe rediculous as to shew theire vanity.

David Hume, in his The History of Great Britain (1756), provided a mixed assessment of Clarendon:

This age affords great materials for history; but did not produce any accomplished historian. Clarendon, however, will always be esteemed an entertaining writer, even independent of our curiosity to know the facts, which he relates. His style is prolix and redundant, and suffocates us by the length of its periods: But it discovers imagination and sentiment, and pleases us at the same time that we disapprove of it. He is more partial in appearance than in reality: For he seems perpetually anxious to apologize for the king; but his apologies are often well grounded. He is less partial in his relation of facts, than in his account of characters: He was too honest a man to falsify the former; his affections were easily capable, unknown to himself, of disguising the latter. An air of probity and goodness runs through the whole work; as these qualities did in reality embellish the whole life of the author.

The republican Whig historian Catharine Macaulay believed the History to be "as faithful an account of facts as any to be found in those times. ... The characters are described in strong if not just colours, but the style is disagreeably pompous". She also added that "the author's conclusions are so much at war with his facts that he is apt to disgust a candid reader with his prejudices and partiality".

The debate over the Civil War continued into the 18th century, with Tory defences of the History against Whig criticisms appearing in 1716 by Henry Cantrell, in 1731 by Francis Atterbury, in 1732 by William Shippen and in 1739 by John Davys. In 1757, the former Whig Secretary of State Thomas Robinson claimed "the creed of those gentlemen was in the preface to Clarendon's History", i.e. that written by Laurence Hyde in 1701.

== Editions ==
- Edward, Earl of Clarendon, The History of the Rebellion and Civil Wars in England, to which is now Added an Historical View of the Affairs of Ireland, 6 vols., Oxford University Press (1816).
- Clarendon, Edward Hyde, Earl of (1826). The History of the Rebellion and Civil Wars in England, To Which is Added an Historical View of the Affairs of Ireland. Vol. 8. contrib. by William Warburton. Oxford: At the Clarendon Press.
- Lord Clarendon, The History of the Rebellion and Civil Wars in England, edited by W. D. Macray, 6 vols. Clarendon Press (1888); repr. (1958); repr. (1992). The standard, scholarly edition.
- Gertrude Huehns (ed.), Clarendon: Selections from The History of the Rebellion and Civil Wars and the Life By Himself (Oxford: Oxford University Press, 1955).
- Paul Seaward (ed.), Edward Hyde, Earl of Clarendon: The History of the Rebellion. A New Selection (Oxford: Oxford University Press, 2009).

== Sources ==
- Colley, Linda (1985). In Defiance of Oligarchy: The Tory Party, 1714–60. Cambridge University Press.
- Feiling, Keith (1959). A History of the Tory Party: 1640–1714. Clarendon Press.
- Flaningam, John (1977). "The Occasional Conformity Controversy: Ideology and Party Politics, 1697-1711". Journal of British Studies. 17 (1): 38–62. doi:10.1086/385711. JSTOR 175691.
- Gregg, Edward (2001). Queen Anne. Yale University Press.
- Hill, Bridget (1992). The Republican Virago: The Life and Times of Catharine Macaulay, Historian. Clarendon Press.
- Hume, David (1756). The History of England from the Invasion of Julius Caesar to The Revolution in 1688 (1983 ed.). Liberty Fund.
- Richardson, R.C (1977). The Debate on the English Revolution. Methuen.
- Seaward, Paul, ed. (2009). Introduction to Edward Hyde, Earl of Clarendon: The History of the Rebellion; A New Selection. Oxford University Press.
- Tomalin, Claire (2002). Samuel Pepys; the unequalled self. Knopf.
- Worden, Blair (2001). Roundhead Reputations: The English Civil Wars and the Passions of Posterity. Penguin.
