= Theophilus Dunn =

English fortune teller

- Born: c. 1790; Netherton, West Midlands
- Died: 9 October 1851; Netherton, West Midlands
- Other names: Dudley Devil
- Known for: Fortune Telling

Theophilus Dunn (c. 1790 – 9 October 1851) was a fortune teller from Netherton, West Midlands who achieved regional fame for his claimed abilities to tell fortunes, find lost valuables, and cast healing spells. He became known by some as the "Dudley Devil".

== Life ==
Theophilus Dunn was born at the end of the 18th century and lived for many years in Netherton, near Dudley. He achieved some fame as a fortune teller, finder of lost objects, and as someone who could cast healing spells.

He supposedly was fairly well educated and could "cast a horoscope with as much facility almost as a Nostradamus".

A number of stories are told of his prophesies such as warning the prizefighter, William Perry of his forthcoming defeat at the hands of Tom Sayers.

An obituary in a local paper claimed that "he was the chief resource in times of difficulty or trial to half the lower classes of society in the district in which he resided". It was also stated that he was the "restorer of lost goods, the discoverer of stolen property, the healer of broken hearts" and that "apparently respectable persons" had travelled fifty to sixty miles for consultations with Dunn.

Reputedly, he sold charms to cure toothache, priced at 1 shilling, consisting of a supposed dialogue between Jesus and St Peter, written on a piece of paper, in which the apostle is cured of his painful teeth by faith.

== Death ==
Theophilus Dunn was found dead at his home on 9 October 1851, apparently after taking his own life by affixing a handkerchief around a beam then around his neck to strangle himself. The official verdict of the subsequent inquest, at The Fox and Goose Inn, being "insanity". His death was reported in many British newspapers, some published as far away as John o' Groats, Scotland.

His grave is located in the churchyard of St Andrews', Netherton. Some people are known to leave herbs and trinkets in his memory.
