= 9th Wonder of the World =

9th Wonder of the World or Ninth Wonder of the World may refer to:

== People ==
- Joseph Darby (jumper) (1861–1937), English long jumper nicknamed the "Ninth Wonder of the World"
- Chyna (1969–2016), American professional wrestler nicknamed the "Ninth Wonder of the World"

== Film ==
- Ninth Wonder of the World: The Making of Gorgo, documentary film about the making of the 1961 film Gorgo
- Prince Charles Cinema, repertory cinema in the West End of London, England

== Music ==
- 9th Wonder of the World, 1998 album by Witchdoctor
- Ninth Wonder of the World of Music, 2012 album by Ironing Board Sam

== Other ==
- Christchurch Seagull Pit, tourist attraction in New Zealand
