= Leap Castle =

Castle in Ireland

Coordinates: 53.0281°N 7.8085°W

- Caisleán Léim Uí Bhánáin
- Roscrea, Ireland in Ireland
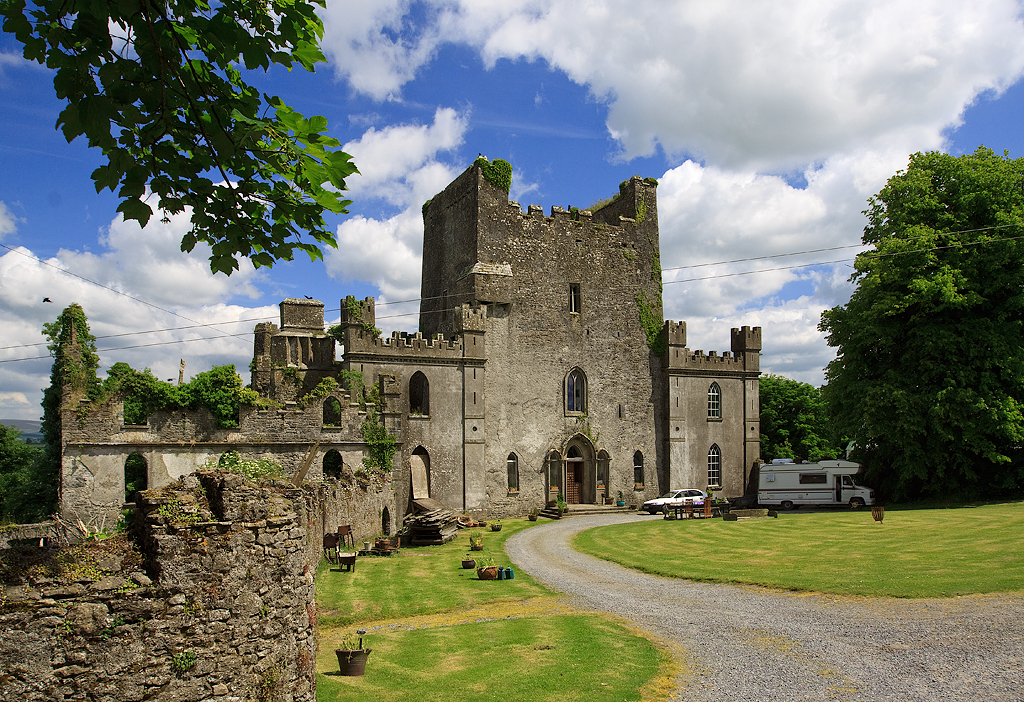
- Leap Castle in 2010

Site information
- Owner: Privately Owned
- Open to the public: Yes
- Condition: Restored
- Website: https://leapcastle.net

Location
- Location in Ireland

Site history
- Built: 1250 AD
- Built by: O'Bannon clan (possibly)
- Materials: Stone
- Events: Irish Civil War

Leap Castle (/ˈlɛp/; Irish: Caisleán Léim Uí Bhánáin (IPA:[ˈkaʃlʲaːn̪ˠlʲeːmʲiːˈwaːn̪ˠaːnʲ])) is a castle in Roscrea, County Offaly, Ireland, about 6 kilometres (3.7 mi) north of the town of Roscrea and 10 kilometres (6.2 mi) south of Kinnitty on the R421.

== History ==
There are varied accounts as to when exactly the main tower/keep was constructed, ranging anywhere from the 13th century to the late 15th century, but most likely around 1250 AD. It was built by the O'Bannon clan and was originally called "Léim Uí Bhanáin" (as was the fertile land around the castle which was associated with the Bannon clan) or "Leap of the O'Bannons". The O'Bannons were the "secondary chieftains" of the territory and were subject to the ruling O'Carroll clan. There is evidence that it was constructed on the same site as another ancient stone structure, perhaps ceremonial in nature, and that that area has been occupied consistently since at least the Iron Age (500 BCE) and possibly since Neolithic times.

The Annals of the Four Masters record that the Earl of Kildare, Gerald FitzGerald, tried unsuccessfully to seize the castle in 1513. In 1516, he attacked the castle again and managed to partially demolish sections of it. By 1557, the O'Carrolls had regained possession.

Following the death of Mulrooney O'Carroll in 1532, family struggles plagued the O'Carroll clan. A fierce rivalry for leadership erupted within the family. The bitter fight for power turned brother against brother. One of the brothers was a priest. While he was holding mass for a group of his family, in what is now called the "Bloody Chapel", his rival brother burst into the chapel, plunged his sword into him and fatally wounded him. The butchered priest fell across the altar and died in front of his family.

In 1642, the castle passed by marriage into the ownership of the Darby family, notable members of whom included Vice-Admiral George Darby, Admiral Sir Henry D'Esterre Darby and John Nelson Darby. During the tenure of one Jonathan Charles Darby, séances were held in the castle by his wife Mildred Darby, who was a writer of Gothic novels: this led to publicity about the castle and its ghosts. The central keep was later expanded with significant extensions, but in order to pay for these, rents were raised, and much of the land accompanying the castle was sold. This is one theorized motivation for the burning of the castle during the Irish Civil War in 1922. The castle was burned by supposed raiders. Stated that they intended to burn the castle. Dawkins requested time to remove his wife and child and was granted twenty minutes to do so. After this period, the raiders entered the building, distributed petrol throughout the rooms, and set the structure on fire.

In September 1922, after its destruction, Mr. Darby obtained a reinstatement estimate from Beckett & Medcalf, surveyors in Dublin. Confusingly, it gives the address as Leap Castle, Roscrea, County Tipperary. The net "Amount of Claim" was £22,684.19.1, equivalent to about €1m in 2018. The claim was settled for a lesser amount.

In 1974, the now ruined castle was bought by Australian historian Peter Bartlett, whose mother had been a Banon. Bartlett, together with builder Joe Sullivan, carried out extensive restoration work on the castle up to the time of his death in 1989. Since 1991, the castle has been privately owned by the musician Sean Ryan and his wife Anne, who continue the restoration work.

== In popular culture ==
The castle has been visited by paranormal investigators from ABC Family's Scariest Places on Earth and Living TV's Most Haunted in its first season, and The Atlantic Paranormal Society (TAPS) from Syfy's Ghost Hunters. In August 2014, Travel Channel's Ghost Adventures filmed their tenth season Halloween special at the castle, and most recently by paranormal investigation Youtube channel Sam and Colby.

Claims of paranormal activity include the putative existence of a Red Lady ghost, the ghosts of two girls, and an "elemental spirit" associated with Mildred Darby. The castle describes itself as "the world's most haunted castle".

The castle was featured on the cover of several editions of the novel The Riders by Tim Winton.

In 1996, Leap Castle's history and hauntings were examined in Castle Ghosts of Ireland by Robert Hardy.

A chapter in "The World of Lore: Dreadful Places" by Aaron Mahnke is dedicated to Leap Castle. It is titled The Tainted Well in reference to the castle's gruesome oubliette. The castle is featured in his podcast Lore, Episode 68: The Tainted Well.
