= Mushroom Green =

Coordinates: 52.4766°N 2.0935°W

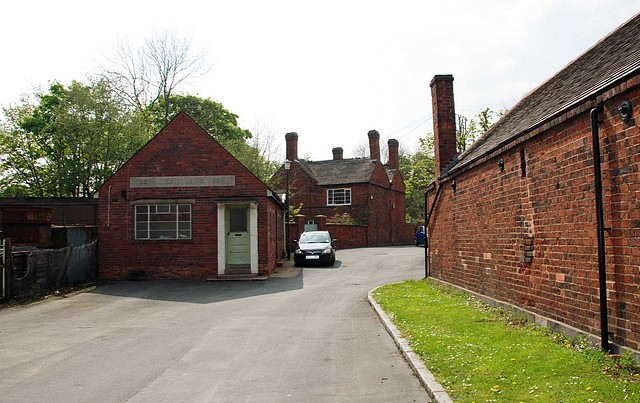
Buildings at Mushroom Green

Mushroom Green is a hamlet in the Dudley Wood/Netherton area of Dudley, West Midlands, England. It is known for its traditional chain making shop, which is the only remaining chain shop in its original grounds in Europe. The Chain Shop is run by volunteers and curated by local sculptor Luke Perry, director of the non-profit Black Country company, the Industrial Heritage Stronghold (IHS). The Chain Shop is open to the public for free demonstrations of traditional chain making on the second Sunday of the month from April to October between 2pm and 5pm.

== History ==
According to Dudley Council's planning and leisure department, Mushroom Green began with the settling of nail-makers in the 18th century on common land which was part of Pensnett Chase. Under the inclosure acts of the 18th century, the land was awarded to the Viscount of Dudley and Ward, to whom an annual cottage rent was then due, even by the earliest nailors who had been squatters.

The building material used was cheap and easily obtained locally: clay to build 'mud' houses (these have all gone), blast furnace slag (later rendered), and local brick. The siting of new dwellings was often based on kinship between neighbours. Small workshop buildings accompanied most of the dwellings and the occupants were poor and exploited by a series of middlemen who delivered the raw material and collected the end-product: nails. In many cases the women folk would have made the nails while their husbands and fathers went to other employment in the mines and furnaces such as at Saltwells or Cradley Forge.

Towards the end of the 18th century, many manufacturing processes were being mechanised nationally and by 1830 mechanised nail making had begun in Birmingham. By 1810 a chain making workshop appears in records of Mushroom Green and the nailors adapted their hearths to making chain, which was more communal and the workshops larger, but it used similar skills. By the end of the 19th century most properties in the settlement had a chainshop close to them. Several chainshops survived into the twentieth century but only one remains in anything like its original form having been restored by the local authority and the Black Country Society in the 1970s.

In 1852 a branch of the Pensnett railway opened to serve Saltwells Colliery, passing through Mushroom Green. A platelayer’s hut shows up on maps from 1884, adjacent to the Griff Chains chainshop established in 1865. Although demolished in the 1980s it was carefully rebuilt in an adapted form in 1992 and has a use as a garage and outbuilding.

Ron Moss, former chairman of the Industrial Archaeology Group of the Black Country Society supervised the opening of Mushroom Green Chainshop for 29 years on a monthly basis during the summer months arranging for Chainmakers Clarry Johnson and Mick Bradney to demonstrate their skill of making chain by hand. Many visitors attended these Sunday afternoon sessions as well as school children during the week as part of history lessons which Ron also liaised with local schools.

Ron was very involved in the restoration of the chainshop and the following is a summary of the book "Mushroom Green Chainshop" Ron wrote as part of the Black Country Society Studies in Industrial Archaeology series of books

In June 1972 the Black Country Society received a letter from the Planning Department of the then County Borough of Dudley with the information that “the future of the old chain shop and adjoining cottage in the Mushroom Green Conservation Area is now in double. Comments were requested on “the desirability of retaining these buildings to prevent their demolition.” Various meetings took place during 1972 concluding in November that the Black Country Society should be allowed to carry out the restoration albeit with a number of conditions.

Over the next 4 years after many meetings the chainshop and cottage were restored with BCS members providing a working party in the early days to remove rubbish and building contractors Arthur Webb and Sons Quarry Bank were chosen to do the restoration work which they did sympathetically with great care to keep the buildings as authentic as possible.

In May 1976 the chainshop was handed over to the Black Country Museum for fitting out with chainmaking tools and equipment to prepare it for re-opening which took place on 1st February 1977.

=== Ron remembered ===
After his passing on 4 April 2019 the Black Country Bugle published a tribute to Ron and on 16 October 2021 the Black Country Society unveiled a plaque at Mushroom Green Chainshop in recognition of Ron's vision and dedicated involvement saving Mushroom Green Chainshop.
