= Netherton Reservoir =

Lake in the West Midlands, England

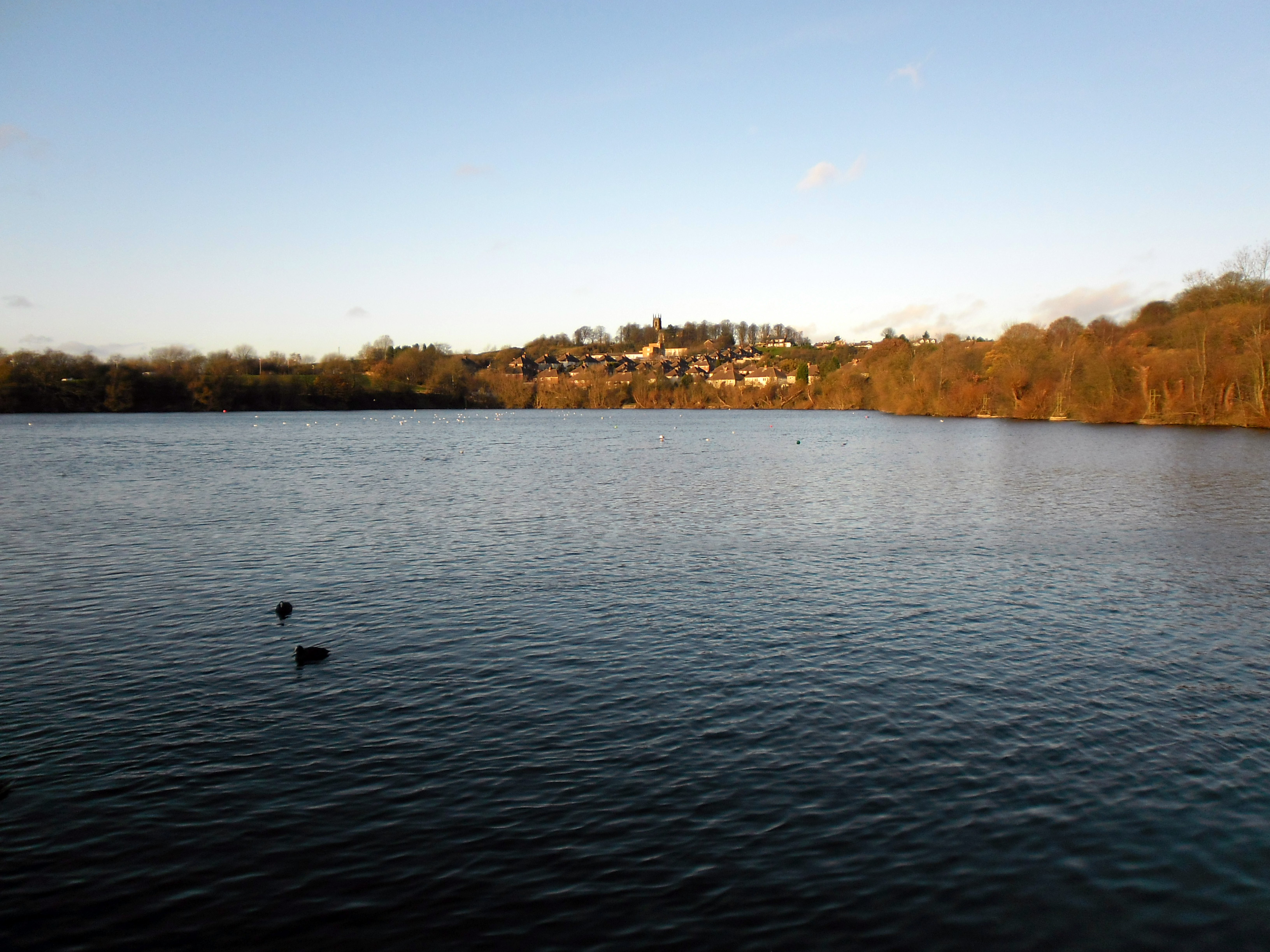
- Looking north towards Netherton Hill

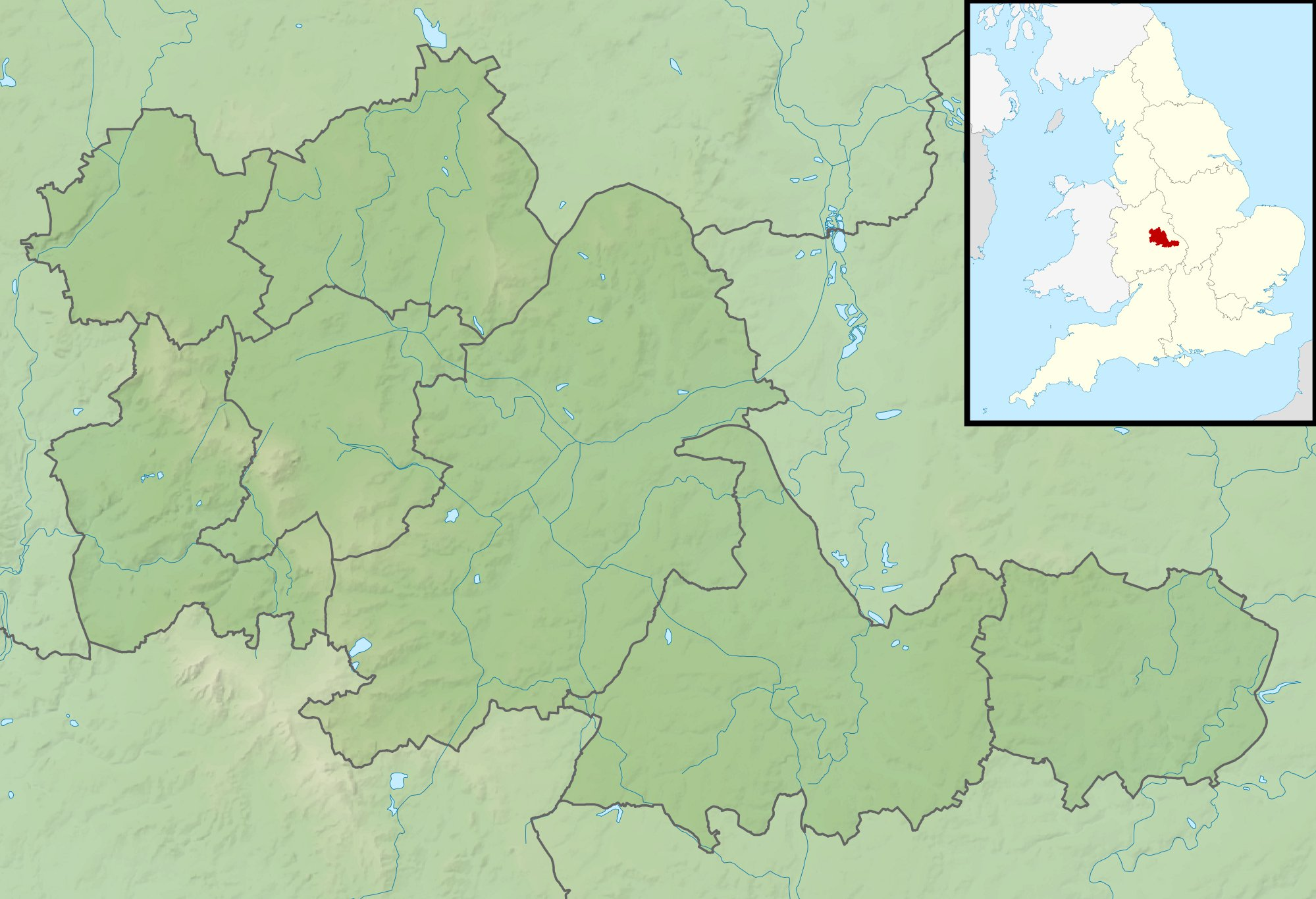
- Location within West Midlands county
- Location: Netherton, West Midlands
- Coordinates: 52.4846°N 2.0942°W
- Lake type: reservoir
- Primary inflows: Surface runoff
- Primary outflows: via culvert to Dudley Canal
- Catchment area: 60,000 m^{2} (650,000 sq ft)
- Managing agency: Dudley Metropolitan Borough Council
- Built: 1835-38
- Max. length: 265 m (869 ft)
- Max. width: 250 m (820 ft)
- Surface area: 60,000 m^{2} (650,000 sq ft)
- Average depth: 8 m (26 ft)
- Max. depth: 15 m (49 ft)
- Water volume: 625,000 m^{3} (22,100,000 cu ft)
- Shore length^{1}: 0.9 km (0.56 mi)
- Surface elevation: 138 m (453 ft)
- ^{1} Shore length is not a well-defined measure.

Netherton Reservoir shown within the West Midlands (grid reference SO936874)

Netherton Reservoir - otherwise known as Lodge Farm Reservoir or locally known as The Rezza is a canal feeder reservoir in the Netherton district of Dudley, England. It opened in 1838, and is now used for watersports, as well as supplying water to the canal system.

The Dudley Canal Line No 2 followed a circuitous route, but in the 1830s Thomas Brewin was responsible for building a more direct route. The total length of the new canal, which opened in 1838, was about 400 yards (370 m), which included a 75-yard (69 m) tunnel, known as Brewin's Tunnel. The new route enabled a reservoir to be built over the old course of the canal, together with a steam-powered pumping engine. The tunnel did not last long, as it was opened out in 1858, necessitating the construction of a bridge to carry the lane which had previously crossed over the top of the tunnel. The bridge is now called High Bridge (locally known as the "Sounding Bridge"), and the lane is called Highbridge Road.

The reservoir, which was built between 1835 and 1838, acted as a storage reservoir, so that when water was plentiful, as a result of rain, it could be pumped from the canal into the reservoir, and then released back into the canal through sluices near the tunnel when it was required. The engine was installed in 1840, and drove a scoop wheel. A cottage was provided for the sluice keeper.

With the nationalisation of the canals in 1948, ownership of the reservoir passed from the Birmingham Canal Navigations, with whom the Dudley Canal had amalgamated in 1846, to British Waterways. They sold it to Dudley Metropolitan Borough Council in 1966, who wanted to improve the leisure facilities within their area, and have since developed it for watersports, although it still supplies water to the canal.

== Facilities ==
The reservoir now hosts watersports including scuba diving, yachting and water skiing. The Dudley Water Ski and Yacht Club began as an informal society in 1963, and negotiated with Dudley Council to allow them to use the reservoir for their activities. Changing rooms and a clubhouse were built, and the use of the reservoir was shared with two diving clubs, although they remained independent of the original club. Subsequently, the club became the Dudley Water Sports Centre, and registered with Companies House as a private limited company in 1997.

The Dudley Dolphin BSAC diving club began as a group of like-minded divers in 1959. Negotiations with the Water Ski and Yacht Club were not initially successful, as the activities appeared to conflict, but a suitable compromise was worked out in 1964, and the club was formed by constitution. Diving was suspended in 1967, as swimmers were perceived as a hazard to boats, but more negotiations led to a trial reinstatement of the activity in October 1968, and it became permanent in December 1969. The club did not affiliate to the British Sub-Aqua Club (BSAC), as they were carrying out research into fish in the reservoir, while the BSAC supported spearfishing. However, the situation had changed by 1976, and they are now part of that organisation, with all of the trainers holding BSAC qualifications.

In March 1976, members were concerned both about the threat of certain dive sites being closed to non-BSAC clubs and about the possible need of obtaining internationally recognised qualifications to enable them to dive abroad. This led to the Dudley Dolphin club becoming an open branch of the British Sub Aqua club. Dudley Dolphin BSAC has training sessions at Dudley Leisure Centre every Friday (and will be moving to new the facility on completion), with Sunday morning diving at the reservoir. The club is a diving and snorkelling club with an active membership of over 60 members.

In 1973 a group of Black Country scuba diving enthusiasts founded Dudley Nautilus Sub Aqua Club and in February 2016 they celebrated 40 years of being a BSAC branch. Dudley Nautilus hold weekly dives at the Reservoir on Saturday mornings and training sessions at Halesowen Leisure Centre on Thursday evenings.

== Bibliography ==
- Hadfield, Charles (1985). The Canals of the West Midlands. David and Charles. ISBN 0-7153-8644-1.
- Nicholson (2006). Nicholson Guide Vol 2: Severn, Avon & Birmingham. Harper Collins. ISBN 978-0-00-721110-4.
- Shill, Ray (2002). The Birmingham Canal Navigations. Tempus Publishing. ISBN 0-7524-2767-9.
