= Darby End railway station =

Former railway station in England

Darby End Halt
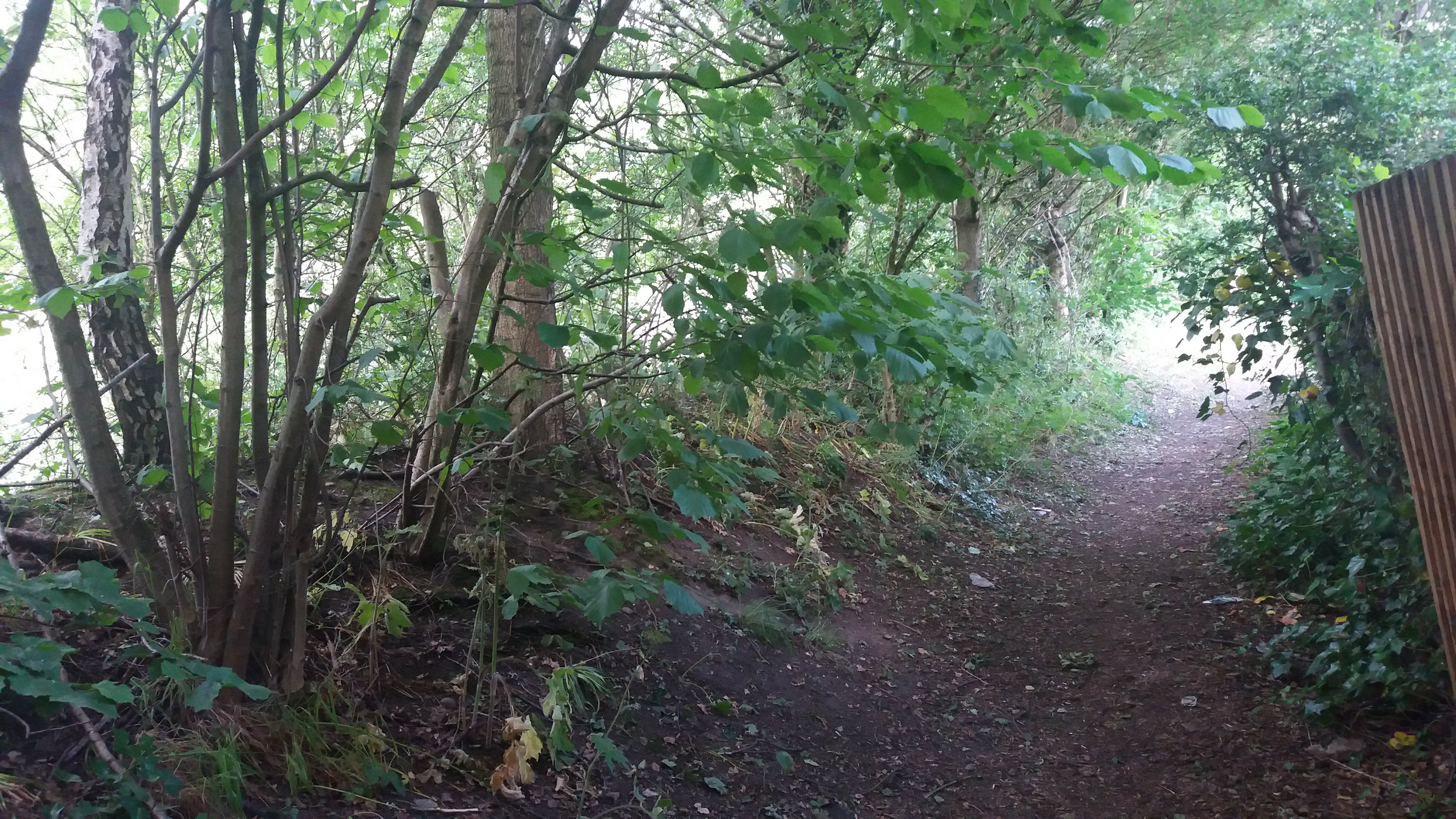
- Station site in 2017

General information
- Location: Darby End, Dudley; England
- Coordinates: 52.4866°N 2.0676°W
- Grid reference: SO955876
- Platforms: 2

Other information
- Status: Disused

History
- Original company: Great Western Railway
- Pre-grouping: Great Western Railway
- Post-grouping: Great Western Railway

Key dates
- 21 August 1905: Opened
- 15 June 1964: Closed
Location

Darby End Halt was a station on the former Great Western Railway's Bumble Hole Line between Blowers Green and Old Hill.

It opened in 1905 and closed in 1964, as part of the Beeching Axe.

Preceding station	Disused railways	Following station
Windmill End	Great Western Railway; Later British Rail; Bumble Hole Line (1878-1964)	Old Hill High Street
