= Withymoor Goods Yard =

Withymoor Goods Yard was a railway goods yard situated in Netherton, West Midlands, England. It opened in 1879 at the termination of a branch line which connected it with the newly opened Bumble Hole Line.

== Closure ==
The goods yard closed in 1964, as a result of the Beeching Axe, though the Bumble Hole Line remained open until 1968.

== The site today ==
=== Industrial use ===
The site of the goods yard was developed for industrial use during the 1990s, some 30 years after the cessation of railway activity.

=== Footpath ===
A short length of the former line is now a footpath linking Netherton Park with Northfield Road. The Greaves Road bridge over the former line still stands at the edge of Netherton Park.
