= Netherton, West Midlands =

Town in the West Midlands, England

Netherton
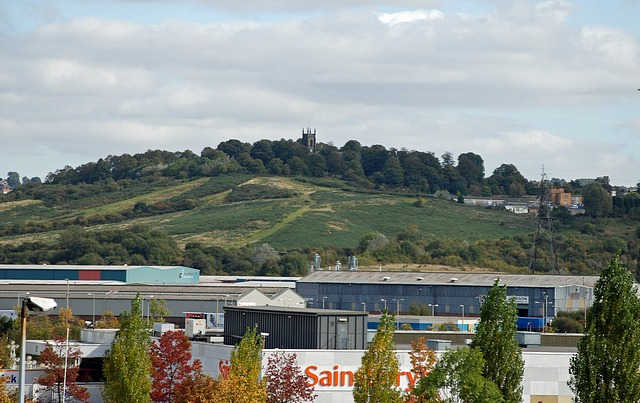
- View of St. Andrew's Church, Netherton, with nearby Merry Hill Centre in the foreground

- Location within the West Midlands
- Population: 15,017 (2011) (Note: Population figure for Netherton, Woodside and St Andrews electoral ward.)
- OS grid reference: SO944881
- Metropolitan borough: Dudley
- Metropolitan county: West Midlands
- Region: West Midlands
- Country: England
- Sovereign state: United Kingdom
- Post town: DUDLEY
- Postcode district: DY2
- Dialling code: 01384
- Police: West Midlands
- Fire: West Midlands
- Ambulance: West Midlands
- UK Parliament: Dudley South

Netherton is a town of the Metropolitan Borough of Dudley, 2 miles (3 km) south of Dudley in the West Midlands of England. It was historically part of Worcestershire. The town is part of the Black Country, Netherton is bounded by nature reserves to the east and west, and an industrial area and the Dudley Southern By-Pass to the north.

== History ==
=== Early history ===
Netherton means "lower farm" in Old English (the corresponding upper farm may have been Dudley itself). For most of its history, Netherton was a small village centred around the point where a brook crossed the Baptist End Road, near the boundary of Pensnett Chase, a partially wooded common. Netherton is mentioned in legal records dating from 1420 and the first mention of a Netherton nailor, an occupation that became very important locally in later years, is dated 1559. The village is called 'Nederton' in the earliest available documents. The village was included in the Manor of Dudley, a Lordship of the Barons of Dudley who once owned a manor house in the area. This property is mentioned in documents dating from the 15th–17th centuries.

In the 17th century, a Baptist Congregation (the Messiah Baptist Church) started meeting in Netherton. The church book for this congregation lists the names of those baptised from the year 1654. Netherton is shown in Joseph Browne's 1682 map of Staffordshire, although like all of Dudley at the time, it lay in a small exclave of Worcestershire. In 1684, King Charles II of England granted a charter to allow the village to hold an annual market fair. The fair was held in Netherton's central square in the last week of October until 1848.

Although records of historic local government in Netherton are rather scarce, records exist of the procedures of the Court Leet of the barons of Dudley from the year 1701. Two juries were sworn in: one to deal with the town of Dudley itself, and one to oversee the 'foreign', the name given to areas of the manor outside the town. In 1729 the court ordered the construction of a pair of stocks at Netherton to 'punish such as the Law directs'.

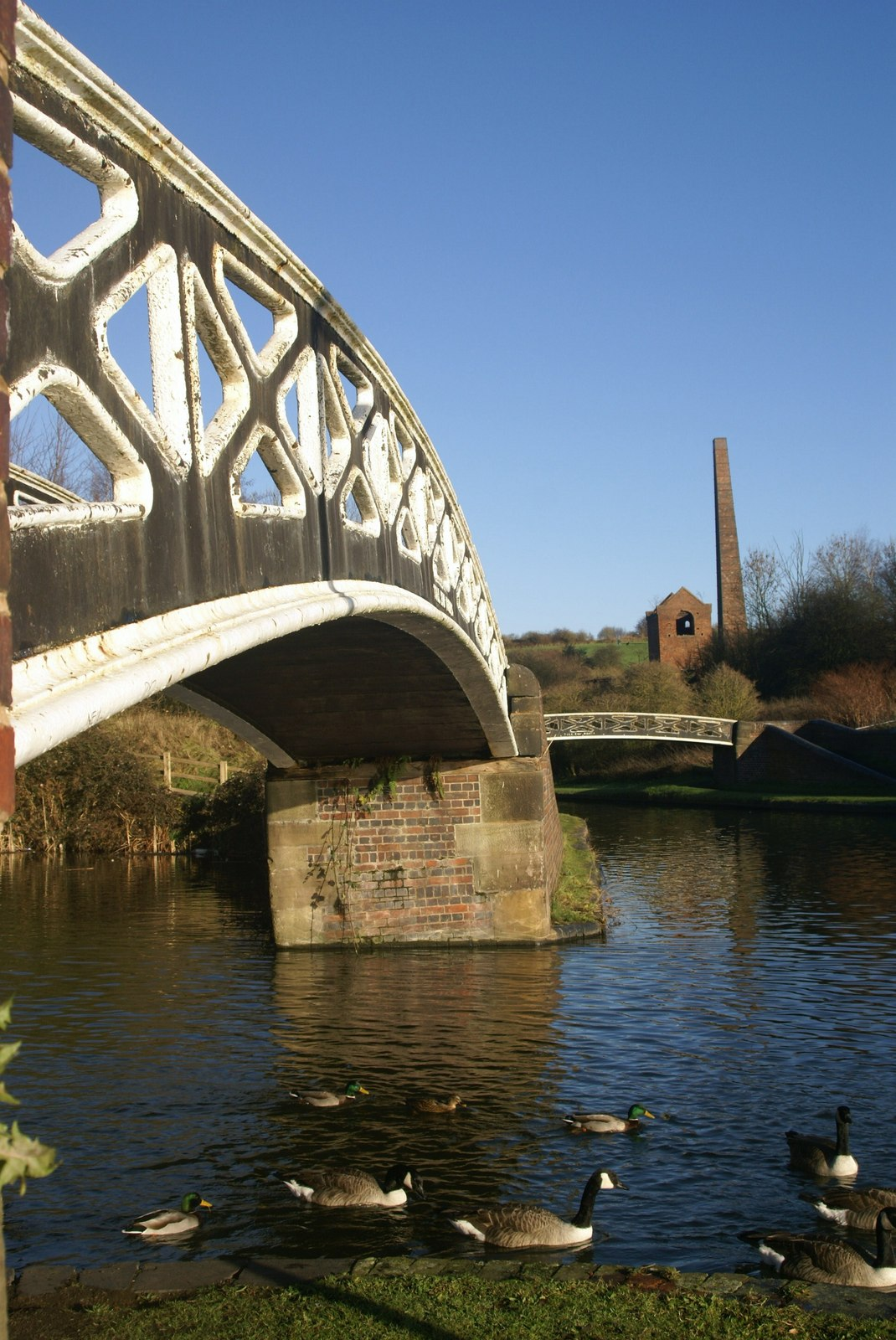
Bumble Hole Nature Reserve, a former industrial area of Netherton

=== Industrial Age ===
Following the Inclosure Acts of the late 18th century, allowing construction in Pensnett Chase, the present-day settlement began to develop further up the hill than its original site. Netherton expanded rapidly in the industrial age and the thick seams of coal underlying the region were extensively mined. Blast furnaces were constructed in for iron making, and the area became home to many industries including chain making, anchor making, nail making, brick making, enamelling, and the construction of boilers.

In 1874, Dr. Ballard, sent by the Local Government Board to inspect the sanitary conditions of the Borough of Dudley, described Netherton as 'a village of such size it almost deserves to be termed a town'.

In the mid-19th century, the area was notorious for its bad sanitary conditions. In 1852 an inquiry into the sewerage, drainage and supply of water was carried out, reporting to the General Board of Health. Its conclusions were very damning for Netherton. A typical comment was: 'Old Netherton Town, Mr. Thomas Woodall's buildings.- Drainage very horrible, with privies and piggeries as usual, and no pavement. Procure water from a horse-pit nearly half a mile, and it has to be carried up hill, mostly by girls, in little pails of about three gallons, on their heads. This was a bad place for cholera'.

In 1844, Netherton became an ecclesiastical parish, and was made an Electoral ward of the Borough of Dudley in 1865 after the town's incorporation as a municipal borough.

=== Modern history ===
The 20th century saw the gradual decline of mining and the heavily polluting industries such as iron-making. At the same time, Dudley Council sought to redevelop areas of Netherton for housing, either by demolishing existing older housing and rebuilding, or by reclaiming abandoned industrial areas. Other former industrial sites were transformed into parkland (Netherton Park) or nature reserves (e.g. Bumble Hole).

Some of the first council houses in Dudley were constructed around Netherton Park in the early 1920s, around the same time as the Yew Tree Hills area, to rehouse families from older and dilapidated houses around the town.

== Places of Interest ==
=== Notable buildings ===
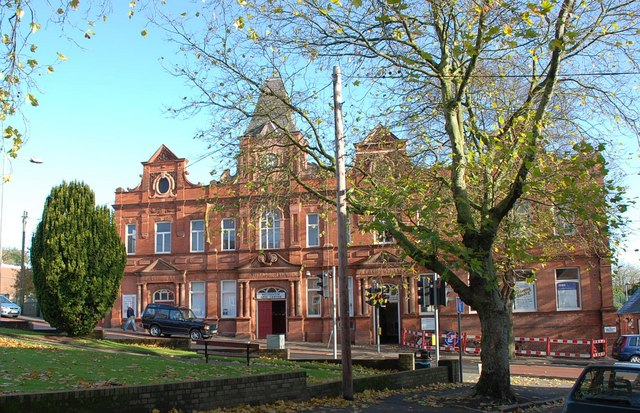
Netherton Arts Centre

The local parish church, St Andrew's, was consecrated in 1830 and is situated on Netherton Hill, the highest point in Netherton. It was originally a chapel-at-ease to St Thomas's of Dudley, only becoming Netherton's parish church in 1844. The church is surrounded by the gravestones of many of the former residents of the area. The churchyard also contains the mass unmarked graves of the victims of cholera that struck Dudley in 1831 and 1832.

Possibly the most notable public building in Netherton is the Victorian Netherton Arts Centre on Northfield Road, which served as a performance venue for the area and a home for Dudley Little Theatre since 1947 until 2020 when it has been abandoned by DPA. A fire station and a number of police houses were constructed at the same time on an adjacent site, though these buildings have since been converted for commercial and community use.

Another local landmark is the Old Swan pub on the A459 Halesowen Road. The current building dates from the 1860s, but there has been a pub on the site since at least 1835. It has been known as Ma Pardoe's since the interwar years, as its long-term landlady was Doris Clare Pardoe (born 1899), who owned it until her death in 1984 at the age of 85. Such was its fame among lovers of real ale, that when the pub came up for sale in 1985, a company was set up by CAMRA to purchase and run the pub. Although this company was short-lived, the pub and brewery survived and is now one of only a handful of pubs in the West Midlands that still brews beer on its own premises. As well as for its beer, the pub is known for its decor including a ceiling decorated with vitreous enamelled iron plates. The pub has been designated a Grade II listed building.

Two old landmarks of Netherton can be viewed at the Black Country Living Museum - Harold Emile Doo's chemist shop and Providence Church.

=== Parks and recreation ===
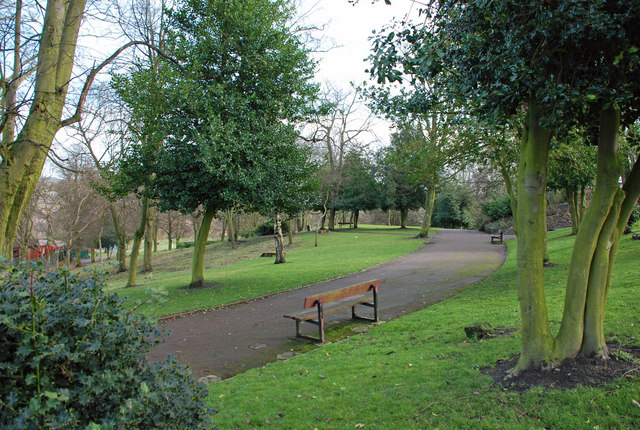
Netherton Park

Saltwells Nature Reserve is situated in the south of Netherton near Brierley Hill. It takes its name from Saltwells Wood, now just part of the reserve, named for its saline springs where people came to bathe in the 19th and early 20th centuries. Doulton's Claypit, a Geological Site of Special Scientific Interest, lies within the reserve.

Netherton Park was laid out in about 1900 on an area that had once been colliery waste. Another old industrial area that has been reclaimed for public recreation is the Bumble Hole, which lies east of Netherton adjacent to Warrens Hall Park, in the neighbouring Sandwell borough. A canalside visitor centre provides information on both nature reserves. The Dudley No. 2 canal runs through the area and is the site for an annual narrowboat festival. A rare Timber Gallows crane, a Scheduled Ancient Monument, stood in the reserve but is currently (2008) undergoing restoration.

Netherton Cricket Club was founded in 1866. It is situated on Highbridge Road and celebrated its 140th anniversary in 2006.

Netherton Reservoir is a popular resort for speedboat enthusiasts as well as scuba divers. Dudley Water Ski Club meet regularly at the reservoir.

=== Facilities ===
The majority of Netherton's shops lie along or just off the A459 Halesowen Road. Aldi, Asda, and Lidl supermarkets are in the area.

Netherton's former triangular-shaped marketplace was situated in the fork of the junction of Halesowen Road and Northfield Road. Old photographs show it to be still in use at the beginning of the 20th century. The area is now a small public garden, on which has been placed a full-sized replica of an anchor of the RMS Titanic, manufactured at local ironworks, Hingley's.

Netherton Health Centre is on Halesowen Road. The Savoy Centre (named for the cinema which used to occupy the site) lies adjacent to the Arts Centre on Northfield Road and provides training, adult education and conference facilities as well as housing the local public library. Netherton's Conservative club is on Halton Street, while Netherton Sports & Social Club can be found in St. Thomas Street.

== Transport ==
With the exception of the occasional canal boat, transport in Netherton today is exclusively by road. The major road link for the area is the A459, running from Dudley to Halesowen. This route was once a turnpike road, with the toll gate being situated near the junction with Swan Street.

Frequent buses link Netherton directly with Dudley town centre, Brierley Hill, Stourbridge, Cradley Heath, Halesowen, and Old Hill, as well as to the Merry Hill Shopping Centre and Birmingham's Queen Elizabeth Hospital. From 20 April 2025 new service 25A (operated by Diamond Bus) will connect the area to Kidderminster.

The Dudley No. 2 Canal runs through Netherton, linking the Dudley No. 1 canal at Parkhead Junction with the south entrance of the Netherton Tunnel. When first constructed in 1798 it ran as far as Selly Oak, where it connected with the Worcester and Birmingham Canal.

Netherton has had no rail service since the 1960s when the Bumble Hole Line, which ran between Dudley and Old Hill railway stations, was taken out of service. The line had stops at Baptist End, Windmill End, and Darby End. A small branch line from Baptist End led to Withymoor Goods Station, which was near where the Dudley No. 2 canal crosses the Halesowen Road.

There were once many industrial and mineral rail lines running through the Netherton area but these have long since closed. For example, the steel firm Grazebrook's had a line running from their factory on Pear Tree Lane to an interchange on the Great Western Railway mainline near the former Blowers Green railway station. A branch of the Earl of Dudley's extensive private railway network, which is usually known as the Pensnett Railway, ran through the Saltwells locality.

== Localities ==
In the north of Netherton lies Baptist End, an area thought to encompass the site of the medieval village. Though the etymology of the name is uncertain, there have been Baptists meeting in the general locality since 1654.

Darby End lies to the southeast. According to local legend, it was named for the Derbyshire nailmakers who settled there, but is more likely to have taken its name from the locally prominent Darby family. In the 19th century the area was commonly referred to as 'Darby Hand'.

Bordering the Bumble Hole nature reserve is Windmill End, and in the south of Netherton is the industrial area of Primrose Hill. Dudley Wood and Bowling Green are two residential areas in the south, near the borough boundary with Sandwell. The now demolished Dudley Wood Stadium, sited in the former, hosted the Cradley Heathens speedway team until the mid-1990s.

The Lodge Farm Estate lies near Saltwells woods, named for the farm which previously occupied the site. In medieval times, the lodge was where the local forester lived and it is likely that this is the ultimate origin of the estate's name, which is sited in what once was Pensnett Chase.

Finally, Mushroom Green is a former industrial hamlet in Netherton's southwest. It is now a Conservation Area.

== Religion ==
Netherton contains a number of churches and chapels. The most prominent, the Anglican parish church of St. Andrew's, was consecrated and opened by the Lord Bishop Folliott on 16 July 1830. The foundation stone of the church had been laid by Dr. Booker, the Vicar of Dudley, on 30 November 1827. The other Church of England churches in the area are St. Peter's, Darby End and St. John the Evangelist, Dudley Wood.

Perhaps more characteristic of Netherton are the nonconformist chapels, of which there are several, such as Ebenezer Baptist Church on St. Andrews Street, and Champions Church on Cinder Bank. More evidence for Baptist activity can be found on Cinder Bank, where the graveyard of the former Messiah Baptist church can be found; the church itself has since been demolished. There are two Methodists churches in the area - Trinity Methodist Church on Church Road, and Cole Street Methodist Church at Darby End. A third Methodist chapel, Noah's Ark on Cradley Road, has since been converted into apartments. Additional churches include the Primrose Hill Community Church on Chapel Street, and the People's Mission chapel on Swan Street.

In 1868 a Sunday School Union was arranged between several of Netherton's churches, with a hymn composed to commemorate the event. This was sung on Netherton Square, and made mention of some of the above chapels.

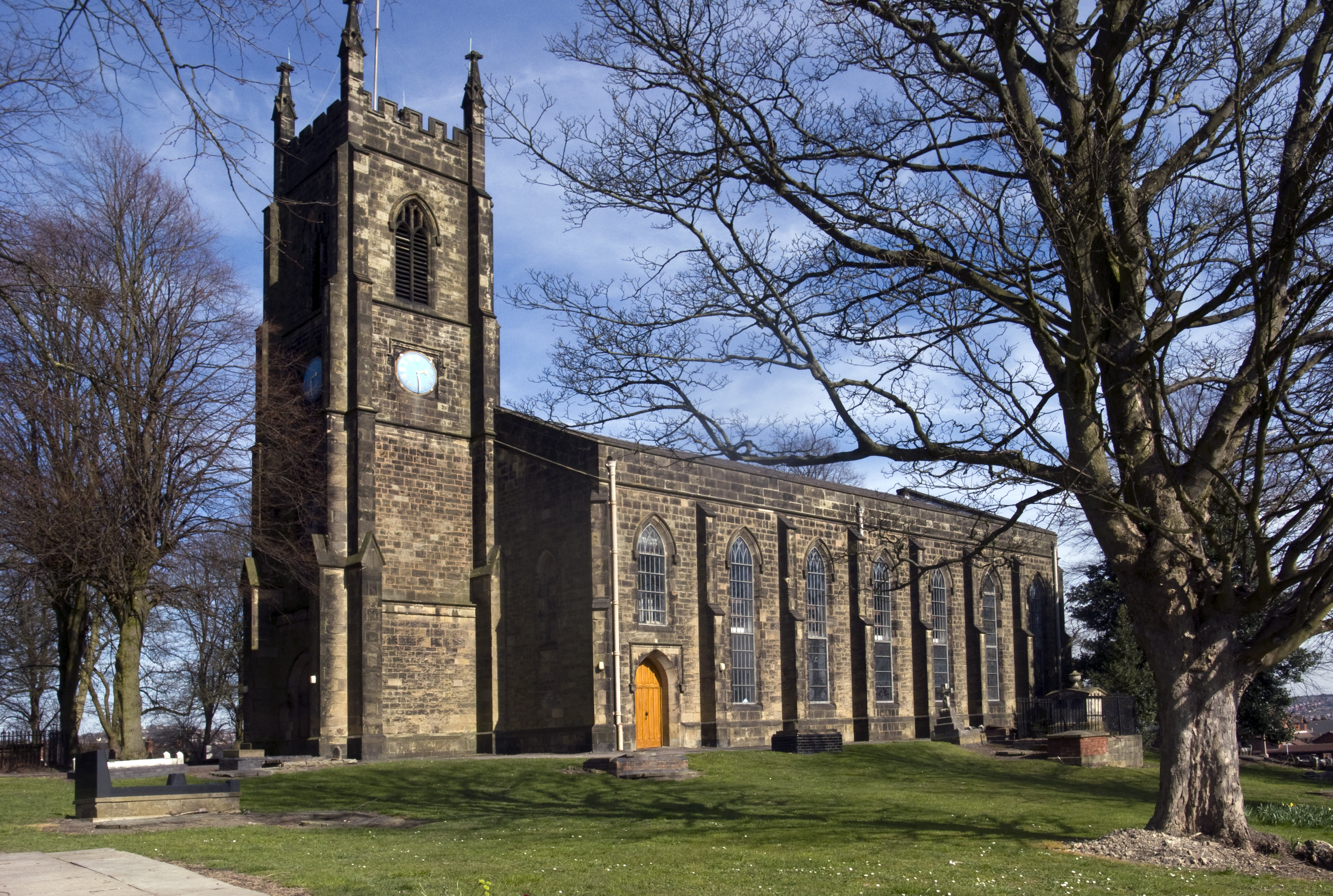
St. Andrew's Church

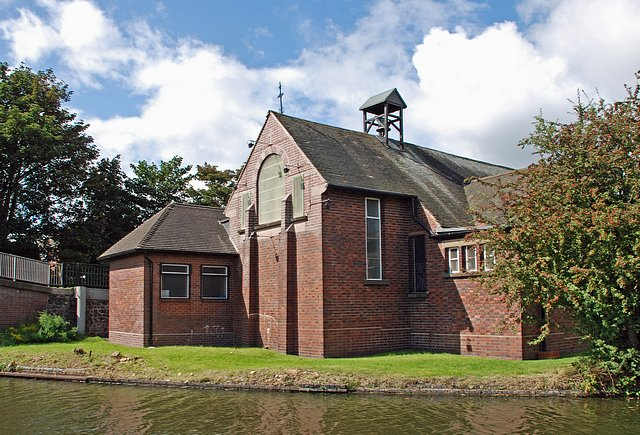
St. Peter's Church, Darby End

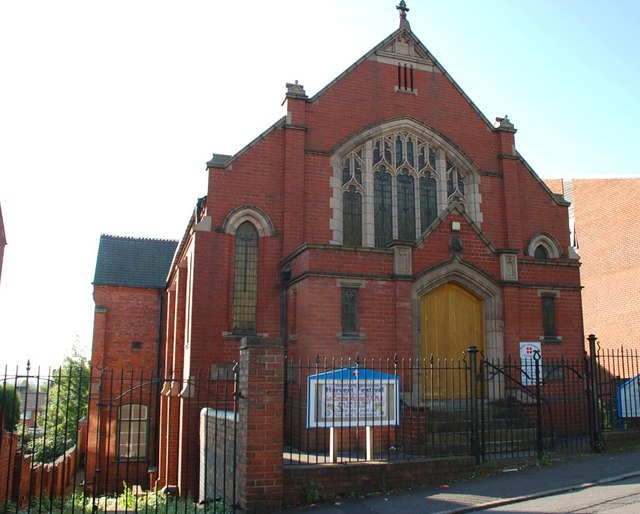
Trinity Methodist Chapel, Church Road

In more recent years, a mosque has opened on Cinder Bank to cater to Netherton's muslim community.

== Education ==
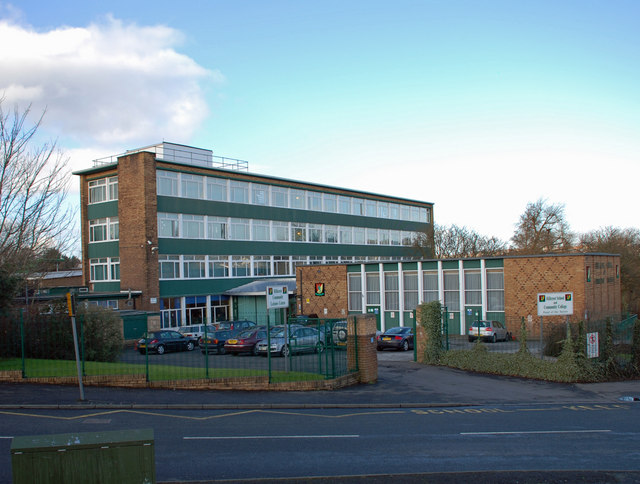
The Link Academy, Netherton

The first school in Netherton was a Church of England establishment built in 1836 at the corner of Halesowen Road and Church Road, providing education for children aged 5 to 11 years. The school was rebuilt in 1907 following problems with subsidence and remained in use until December 1988, by which time it was an 8–12 middle school and merged with a nearby 5–8 first school to form a new primary school. The old school building is still in existence and currently houses a furniture store.

Netherton's comprehensive school, The Link Academy (formerly The Hillcrest School), was considered one of the worst secondary schools in the West Midlands during the 1990s, but improved dramatically following the arrival of head teacher Maureen 'Mo' Brennan. She was made a Dame Commander of the Order of the British Empire in 2005 for her outstanding efforts, which saw the school become one of the most successful schools in the borough just five years after an OFSTED report had placed it in special measures. In 2002, it was mentioned in parliament for its substantial turn-around. Other schools in Netherton include Netherton C of E Primary School on Highbridge Road, Northfield Road Primary School, and Netherbrook Primary School on Chester Road.

Netherton is also home to Saltwells Education Development Centre, the Dudley EDC which was Saltwells Secondary School until 1986.

== Industry ==
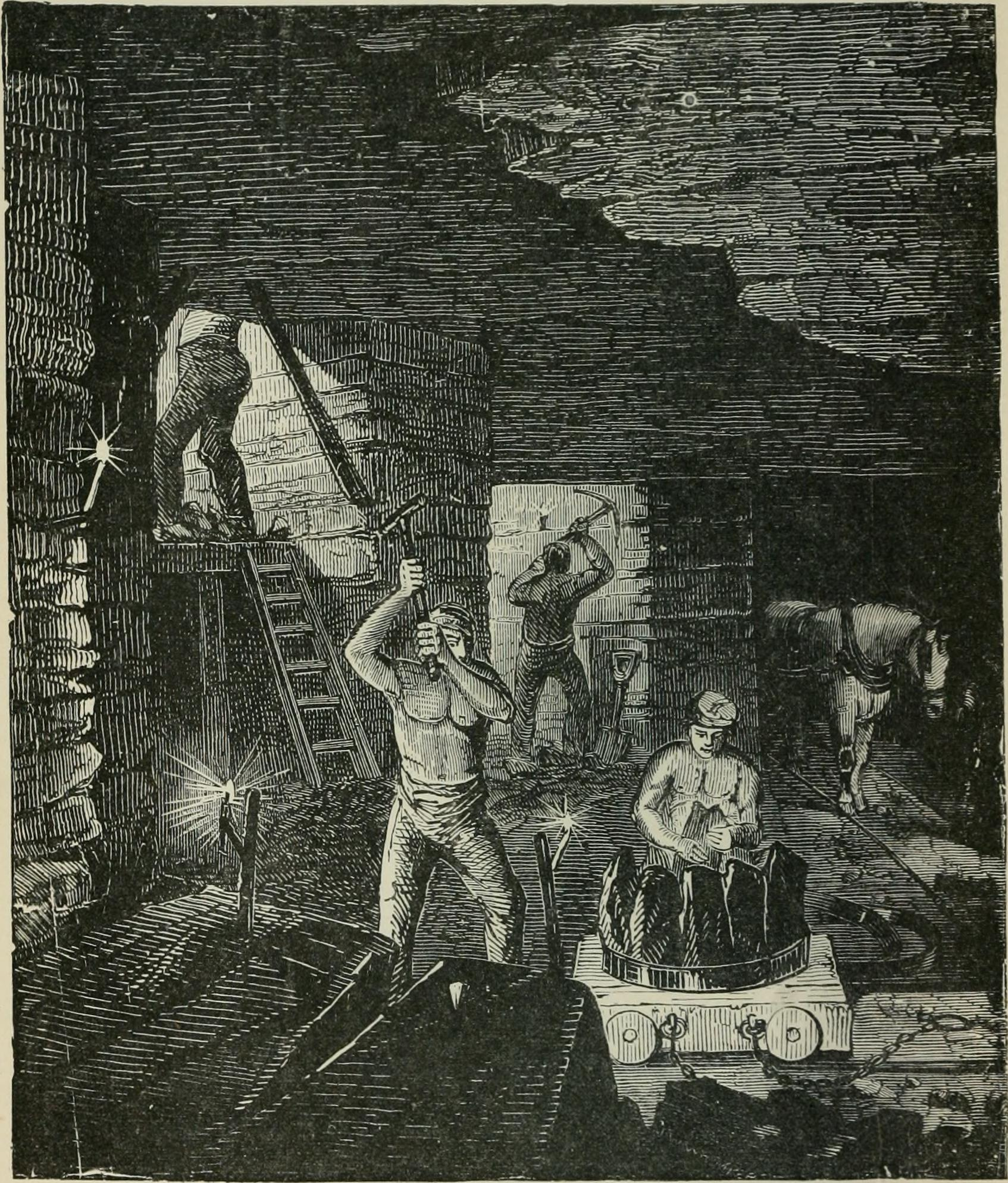
Coal mining in the thick seam at the Earl of Dudley's Saltwells Colliery

Sitiuted on the South Staffordshire coalfield and interspersed with layers of iron ore, fire clay and brick clay, Netherton has long been dominated by industry.

=== Mining ===
Mining in the Netherton area took place since at least the 14th century. According to the Rent Rolls of Lord Dudley and Ward, the income from coal mining on Knowle Hill (the former name for Netherton Hill) formed a large fraction of the total income of the Dudley Estate in 1701. In the 19th century mining was particularly extensive. Collieries included Baptist End, Dudley Wood, Netherton, Netherton Old, Saltwell and Yew Tree Hill. Mining was still being carried out as recently as the 1970s, when an open cast mine was situated on Netherton Hill.

=== Nailmaking ===
Nailmaking in Netherton had been recorded since the 16th century. The area became one of the Black Country's centres of the hand-made nail trade, which reached its peak around 1830. As the hand-made nail trade went into decline, mainly due to the availability of cheaper machine-made nails, wages for nailmakers were decreased, leading to industrial unrest such as the 'Blackcountry Nailer's Riots' of 1842 and the Nailmakers' Strike of 1852. The last type of nail to be made by hand were those used to shoe horses. The Midland Counties Express reported in 1904: 'a few horse-nailers at Netherton and about a dozen female workers at Cawney Hill are the only remaining representatives of the nail trade'. Some nailmakers in the area turned to chainmaking. A working chainshop is preserved in Mushroom Green.

=== Chain and anchor making ===
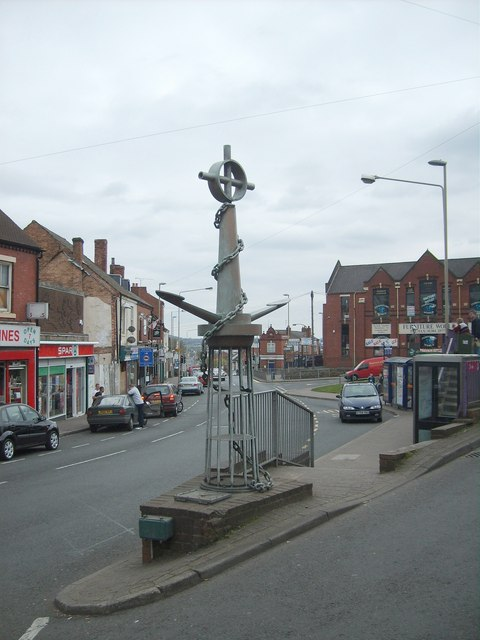
Sculpture commemorating the local anchor and chain industry in Netherton

Netherton chainmakers N. Hingley & Sons were famous for making the anchors for the ocean liner RMS Titanic. The firm's founder, Noah Hingley, started making chain cable for ships in nearby Cradley in 1820. The company N. Hingley & Sons was set up in 1837, and anchor manufacture commenced in 1848. The Netherton works were set up in 1852 on the banks of the Dudley No. 2 canal. The main anchor for the Titanic weighed fifteen and a half tons and, on completion, was hauled from the factory to the rail head at Dudley by 20 Shire horses. A replica of the anchor now stands in the old village square.

Hingleys also produced anchors for the Lusitania and a number of other ocean liners. Their success in international markets and use of the Netherton name for trademarked wrought iron products resulted in Netherton becoming widely known both in the UK and overseas. A sculpture of an anchor stands at the junction of Castleton Street and Halesowen Road, commemorating the local anchor and chain industry, and the anchor motif can be found in a number of places around Netherton (e.g. on benches in Netherton Park). An anchor was also featured on Dudley's former coat of arms, which is featured on public buildings throughout the area.

Immediately adjacent to the works of N. Hingley & Sons on the Dudley No. 2 canal was Lloyds Proving House, where chain was subjected to a variety of tests to show it was of suitable quality.

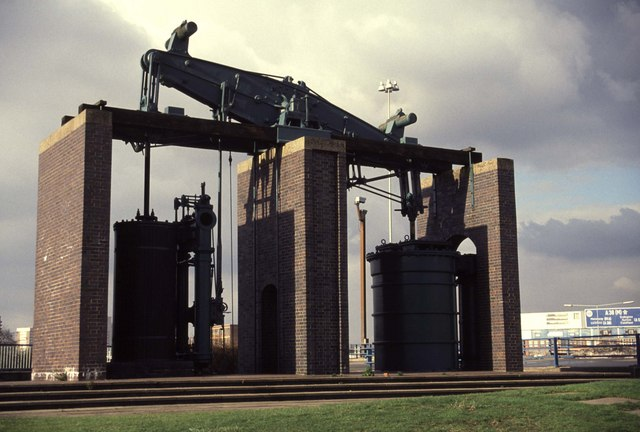
A Boulton & Watt blowing engine re-erected on the Dartmouth Circus roundabout (at 52.492537°N 1.888189°W), on the A38(M) in Birmingham. It was built in 1817 and used in Netherton, at the ironworks of M.W. Grazebrook.

=== Brewing ===
Brewing was a major industry in 19th-century Netherton. Some of the large scale brewers were William Hotchkiss at Castle Street, William Smith at Simms Lane, John Rollinson of St Andrew's Street, and Samuel Bagley at Cole Street. The largest, Netherton Steam Brewery, belonged to Thomas Plant. Plant's malthouse was on Raybould's Fold, and the brewery in St John's Street. The only brewing in Netherton today takes place at the Old Swan pub. However, two of the remaining Black Country brewers, Holdens and Bathams, have Netherton links. Edwin Alfred and Lucy Blanche Holden, founders of the Holdens brewing concern, had their first pub in Netherton; whilst Daniel Batham, son of Daniel and Charlotte Batham who had started the family beer production, brewed at the King William in Cole Street, before moving the brewery to its present location at the Vine on the Delph.

=== Other industries ===
One of the earliest manufacturing firms established in Netherton was Samuel Lewis & Co. Ltd., which was established in 1750. Other notable firms included H. & T. Danks, manufacturers of boilers; John Barnsley and Co., specialists in cranes and hoists; and Grazebrook's, which had furnaces for iron-making. The latter firm was established in 1800 by Michael Grazebrook.

=== Industry today ===
Though not on the same scale as historically, much industry remains in Netherton; for example, in the Washington Centre between Halesowen Road and Cradley Road, and in the Blackbrook Business Park, which was developed in the 1980s as part of the Dudley Enterprise Zone.

== Notable residents ==
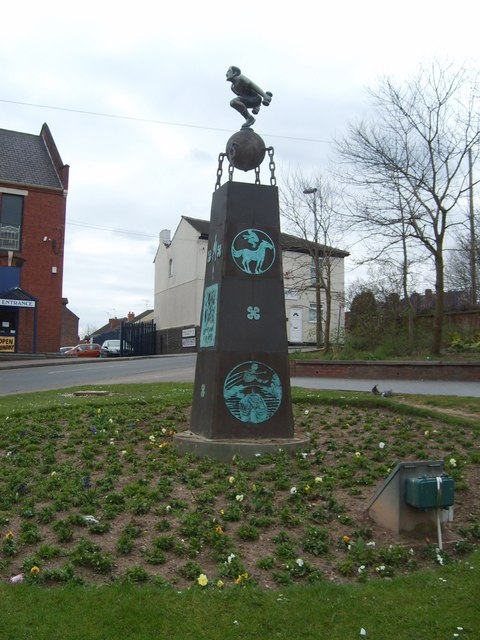
Statue of Joe Darby in Netherton

Netherton was the birthplace of spring-jumping champion Joe Darby, born at Windmill End in 1861. Not only was he a superb athlete but a showman as well, appearing before King Edward VII in Covent Garden, London. In 1887 he defeated W.G Hamlington, then the World Champion spring-jumper. A stylized statue of the athlete stands on the junction of Halesowen Road and Church Road. Some of his more famous exploits are written on plaques on the plinth of the statue.

Another notable resident was England footballer Joe Smith. Born in Darby End in 1890, he played for several local teams before signing for West Bromwich Albion in 1910. He put in 470 appearances for Albion, was a member of the 1920 side that won the First Division, and was capped two times for England. Other Netherton-born footballers include Tom Grosvenor (1908–1972), who played for Birmingham City and was capped 3 times for England; and Billy Wooldridge (1878–1945), who played for Wolverhampton Wanderers and represented the English Football League in two games against the Irish League.

Sammy 'Pigiron' Whitehouse was a strongman from Darby End, who worked unloading canal boats and in a foundry in the earlier part of the 20th century. He became well known locally for his feats of strength. The nickname 'Pigiron' was earned in 1921 when he won a 4-mile race from St. Thomas' Church through Netherton following the Halesowen Road, carrying a hundredweight (112 lb) of pigiron.

Theophilus Dunn, also from Darby End, was a notable 19th-century character, known locally as the 'Dudley Devil'. He was an astrologer and claimed magical healing abilities, charging a shilling for a charm to cure toothache. He also claimed to be able locate stolen property by using charms. In one story, he is said to have prophesied that a certain Mr. Hickman would die by being crushed by coal. As Hickman was not a miner he doubted the prophecy – but was later run over by a coal waggon and killed. Dunn later prophesied the downfall of William Perry (the boxer known as the 'Tipton Slasher') at the hands of Tom Sayers. The prophecy was given in the form of a rhyme with the final line: "Tom Little will mek it come true." (Tom Sayers was considerably smaller than Perry).

== Folklore, legends and customs ==
Like many villages in former times, Netherton had a local celebration known as a Wakes. It was held on the last Sunday in October. On May Day there were festivities connected with the 'Clubs' which met at the various pubs in the village. The 'Clubs', such as the 'Odd Fellows', 'Free Gardeners', 'The Druids', and 'Foresters' put on their regalia and paraded around the village. They met at noon for a special service at the Church before heading to their own taverns for dinner.

Cockfighting took place at a number of cock-pits: at Yew Tree Hills, Northfield Road, and the Bumble Hole. Mark Fletcher describes the court proceedings resulting from the arrest of people suspected of being involved in cockfighting in 1885. The cock-pit was stated to be at the rear of the 'Malt Shovel', Bumble Hole.

There are a number of stories and legends regarding the Baptist church in the locality. It is widely believed that original site of the Messiah Baptist Church was near the junction of Baptist End Road with Swan Street (where the White Swan pub is today), and that Oliver Cromwell passed by on one of his campaigns According to some sources, the church itself was destroyed during riots in 1715, and a new church was built on nearby Cinder Bank. It has also been stated that at Baptist End, the church adherents were baptised in a local canal, taking advantage of the warm water flowing into the canal from the local industry.

In Victorian times, a legendary character known as 'Spring-heeled Jack' was reportedly spotted at a number of locations. The creature was often described as having blazing eyes and had the ability to leap great distances. Joe Darby, the spring jumper from Netherton supposedly started a local 'Spring-heeled Jack' scare when he was seen practising leaping over a local canal at night time, using a miner's lighted helmet to see his way.
