= Edward Darby =

British flying ace

- Born: 7 March 1888; Liverpool, Lancashire, England
- Died: Unknown
- Military career
- Allegiance: United Kingdom
- Branch: Royal Navy; Royal Air Force
- Rank: Second Lieutenant
- Units: No. 5 Squadron RNAS; No. 202 Squadron RAF
- Awards: Distinguished Service Medal

Second Lieutenant Edward Darby DSM (born 7 March 1888, date of death unknown) was a World War I flying ace credited with six aerial victories. From 1910 to 1915, Darby worked as a civilian mechanic in Liverpool.

== Military career ==
Before his airborne experience, Darby served as a gunlayer in the 5 Wing of the Royal Naval Air Service, part of which became the No. 5 Squadron RNAS on April 26, 1916. On 5 August 1917 Darby was serving as an Air Mechanic 1st Class in No. 5 Squadron RNAS when he and pilot Robert Jope-Slade, in a DH.4, drove out of control an Albatros D.III over Snellegem, earning Darby's first aerial victory. Darby was subsequently awarded the Distinguished Service Medal on 14 September, and on 19 November was appointed a probationary observer officer.

On 17 April 1918 Darby was commissioned in the newly formed Royal Air Force as a second lieutenant (observer officer). He was assigned to No. 202 Squadron RAF, formerly No. 2 Squadron RNAS, on May 9, 1917, also flying the DH.4. With pilot Lieutenant A. L. Godfrey, Darby gained his second aerial victory on 4 June, destroying a Pfalz D.III off Zeebrugge. His third came on 27 June, with Lieutenant Laurence Pearson, driving down another D.III over Ostend. On 16 July he and Captain A. V. Bowater accounted for another D.III, driven down south of Ostend. His fifth and sixth victories came on 16 September, again with Lt. Pearson, driving down a Pfalz D.XII over Lissewege, and shooting a Fokker D.VII down in flames over Dudzele.

One September 28, 1917, Darby and his pilot, C. R. Moore, became lost in a storm over Nieuport, and were forced to land behind German lines, both being taken prisoners of war. Darby was repatriated in December 1918.

Darby finally left the RAF, being transferred to the unemployed list on 20 February 1919. A civil registry from 1939 lists his residence as being in Stretford and his occupation as a stone inspector.
