= Jeannie Darby =

American engineering professor

Jeannie Lynn Darby
- Education: University of Texas at Austin
- Scientific career
- Thesis: Depth filtration : measurements and predictions of particle-particle interactions (1988)

Jeannie Darby is an American engineer and professor at the University of California, Davis, specializing in Civil and Environmental Engineering. From 2005 to 2010 she was the Gerald T. and Lillian P. Orlob Professorship in Water Resources Engineering.

== Education ==
Darby received her bachelor's degree in Civil Engineering from Rice University in 1978, followed by a Master of Science degree from Tufts University in 1982. She earned her Ph.D. in 1988 from the University of Texas.

== Career ==
Darby joined the faculty at the University of California, Davis in the Department of Civil and Environmental Engineering in 1989. From 2004 to 2009, she served as Department Chair of Civil and Environmental Engineering. She held the Gerald T. and Lillian P. Orlob Professorship in Water Resources Engineering from 2005 to 2010. In 2022 she was selected as the associate dean for academic personnel and planning.

== Research ==
Darby is known for her work in the field of water treatment, covering topics ranging from water quality management to sustainable infrastructure design. Her research includes investigations of the application of UV disinfection as a water treatment options. She has researched iron-based adsorbents for arsenic removal from groundwater, and is developing technologies for nitrate removal from drinking water sources.

== Awards and honors ==
In 2001 the National Society of Professional Engineers awarded Darby the Engineering Education Excellence Award, and the American Society for Engineering Education awarded her with the Sharon Keillor Award for Women in Engineering Education. In 2017 Darby and Vivian Jensen received the Small Systems Division award for their paper Brine Disposal Options for Small Systems in California’s Central Valley.
