= Mildred Darby =

Anglo-Irish novelist

- Born: 18 March 1867
- Died: 5 January 1932 (aged 64)
- Occupation: Writer
- Writing career
- Genre: Gothic novels

Mildred Darby (née Dill; 18 March 1867 – 5 January 1932) was an Anglo-Irish novelist in the Gothic genre and owner of Leap Castle, considered the most haunted castle in Ireland partly due to her input.

== Biography ==
Mildred Henrietta Gordon Dill was the daughter of Richard Dill and Augusta Caroline Wale. She married Jonathan Charles Darby, son of Jonathan Darby and Caroline Graham. Jonathan Charles Darby was the heir to the Darby family and the last Darby to own Leap Castle. Together he and Mildred had five children.

Mildred Darby was interested in the supernatural and was a regular writer of Gothic novels. Her novel Paddy-risky was published in 1903. Since women writers of Gothic novels often published under alternative names, or anonymously, this book was published under her pen name of Andrew Merry. Her work was reviewed by the Spectator: "Paddy Risky" is a capital farce not unworthy of comparison with the best descriptions of country race-meetings in the "Recollections of an Irish R.M."

In 1910 she published her Gothic novel The Hunger. Her interest in the supernatural was quite common for people of the time and she regularly held séances in the castle. She described the atmosphere and things she claimed to see to the journal Occult Review in December 1908:

Suddenly, two hands were laid on my shoulders. I turned round sharply and saw, as clearly as I see you now-a grey ‘Thing’, standing a couple of feet from me, with its bent arms raised as if it were cursing me. I cannot describe in words how utterly awful the ‘Thing’ was, its very undefinableness rendering the horrible shadow more gruesome. Human in shape, a little shorter than I am, I could just make out the shape of big black holes like great eyes and sharp features, but the whole figure-head, face, hands and all-was grey-unclean, blueish grey, something of the colour and appearance of common cotton wool. But, oh! so sinister, repulsive and devilish. My friends who are clever about occult things say it is what they call an 'Elemental'.

The thing was about the size of a sheep, thin, gaunt and shadowy in parts. Its face was human, or to be more accurate, inhuman, in its vileness, with large holes of blackness for eyes, loose slobbery lips, and a thick saliva-dripping jaw, sloping back suddenly into its neck! Nose it had none, only spreading, cancerous cavities, the whole face being a uniform tint of grey. This too, was the colour of the dark coarse hair covering its head, neck and body. Its forearms were thickly coated with the same hair, so were its paws, large, loose and hand-shaped; and it sat on its hind legs, one hand or paw was raised, and a claw-like finger was extended ready to scratch the paint. Its lustreless eyes, which seemed half decomposed, and looked incredibly foul, stared into mine, and the horrible smell which had before offended my nostrils, only a hundred times intensified, came up to my face, filling me with a deadly nausea. I noticed the lower half of the creature was indefinite and seemed semi-transparent-at least, I could see the framework of the door that led into the gallery through its body.

A friend of the Darbys was Rex Ingram, who went on to be a director in the US and used many of the ideas of the Gothic novel in his work. Mildred Darby told him many of the ghost stories of the castle. Another visitor was St. John D. Seymour who wrote the True Book of Irish Ghost Stories (1914) and who documents various diverse hauntings.

The creature described by Darby as haunting the house is known as The Elemental. According to a letter Mildred Darby sent to Sydney Carroll:

The last appearance of the Elemental were on Nov 25th 1915 [...] On the gallery leaning with “hands” resting on its rail I saw the Thing – the Elemental and smelt it only too well. At the same moment my husband pulled up sharply about 10 feet from the Thing, and half turning let fly a volley of abuse at me ending up 'Dressing up a thing like that to try and make a fool of me. And now you’ll say I’ve seen something and I have not seen anything and there is nothing to see, or ever was.

The castle was burned in 1922. The family moved to England for a time and then to family in Doory Hall, County Longford to await the results of the compensation claims. Mildred H. Darby claimed to have lost drawers containing both printed and unpublished stories. She had sold Paddy-risky for cinema for $2,000 and expected to be able to sell others.

The stories and publicity around the castle and the descriptions of the hauntings have gone on to help label the castle as the most haunted castle in Ireland.

== Bibliography as Andrew Merry ==
- Under One Cover: Eleven Stories, Skeffington & Son, Sabine Baring-Gould, Richard Marsh, Ernest George Henham, Fergus Hume, Andrew Merry, Arthur St. John Adcock, 1898
- The Green Country, Grant Richards, Andrew Merry, 1902
- Paddy-risky: Irish realities of to-day Andrew Merry, G. Richards, 1903
- The Hunger: Being Realities of the Famine Years in Ireland, 1845 to 1848, Andrew Melrose, Andrew Merry, 1910
