= Mike Darby =

Australian rules footballer

Personal information
- Full name: Mike Darby
- Born: 19 June 1942
- Died: 3 March 2012 (aged 69)
- Original team: Ascot Vale Rovers
- Height: 185 cm (6 ft 1 in)
- Weight: 78 kg (172 lb)

Playing career^{1}
Years	Club	Games (Goals)
1961–62	North Melbourne	9 (0)
- ^{1} Playing statistics correct to the end of 1962.

Mike Darby (19 June 1942 – 3 March 2012) was an Australian rules footballer who played with North Melbourne in the Victorian Football League (VFL).
