= James Darby =

English cricketer

Personal information
- Full name: James Herbert Darby
- Born: 26 October 1865; Fareham, Hampshire, England
- Died: 7 November 1943 (aged 78); Fareham, Hampshire, England
- Batting: Right-handed
- Bowling: Unknown

Domestic team information
- Years: Team
- 1884–1897: Hampshire

Career statistics
Competition	First-class
Matches	4
Runs scored	78
Batting average	13.00
100s/50s	–/–
Top score	35
Balls bowled	70
Wickets	0
Bowling average	–
5 wickets in innings	–
10 wickets in match	–
Best bowling	–
Catches/stumpings	1/–
- Source: Cricinfo, 3 January 2010

James Herbert Darby (26 October 1865 – 7 November 1943) was an English first-class cricketer.

Darby was born at Fareham in October 1865. He made his debut in first-class cricket for Hampshire against Sussex at Hove in 1884. Following the 1884 season, Hampshire lost their first-class status and spent the next decade playing as a second-class county. Three years after Hampshire regained their first-class status, Darby returned to first-class cricket when he played against Warwickshire in the 1897 County Championship. He made two further first-class appearances in that season, against Yorkshire and Sussex. In four first-class matches, he scored 78 runs with a highest score of 35. Darby died at Fareham in November 1943, following a long illness.
