= Darby Steam-Digger =

Light traction engine

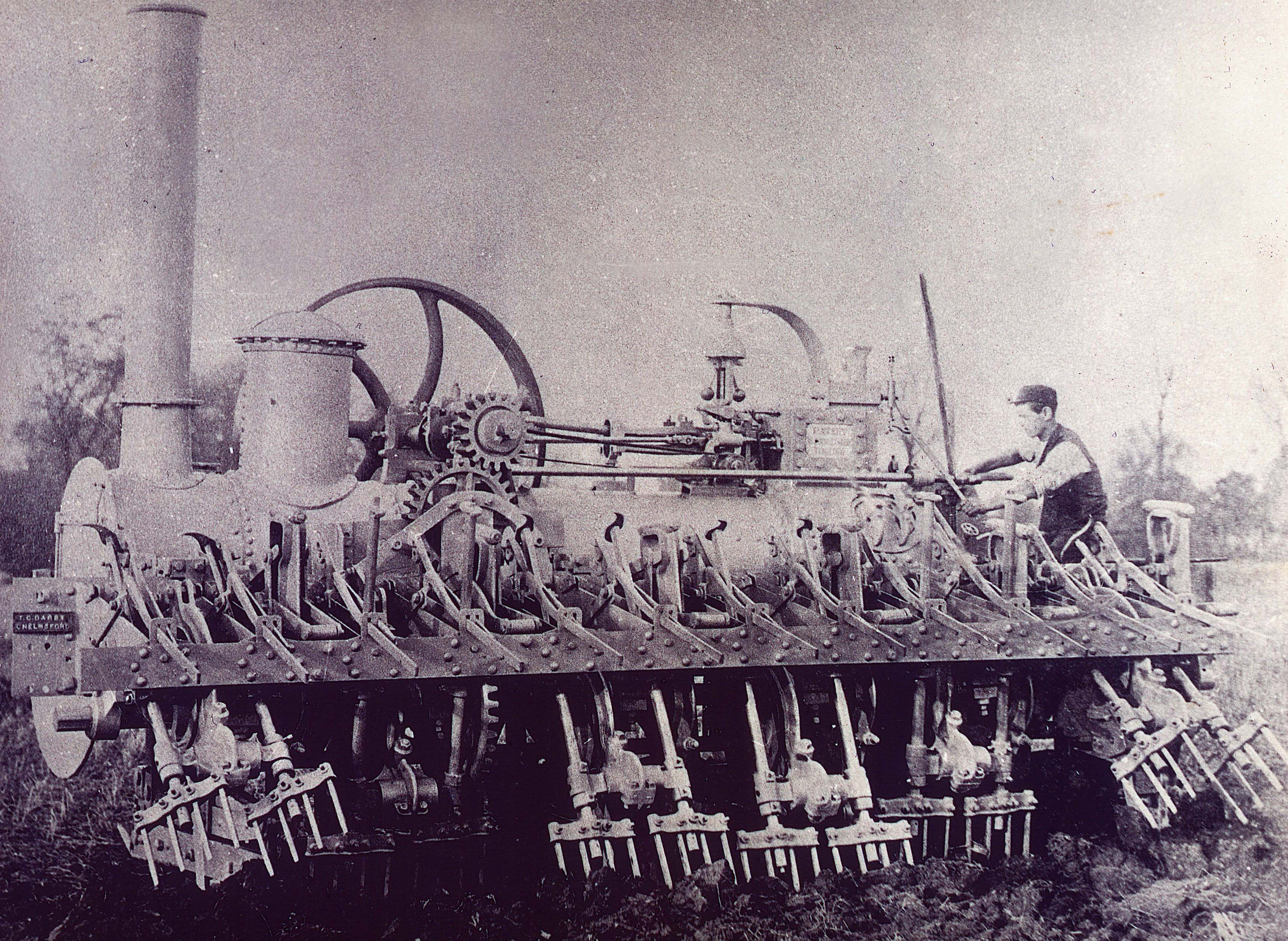
The Darby Steam-Digger

The Darby Steam-Digger, a light traction engine, was invented circa 1879 by farmer Thomas Darby and built at Lodge Farm Pleshey, near Chelmsford in Essex, England. Robert Hasler, seen driving the Digger, helped to build this first prototype. In 1900 the company moved to a 6-acre site known as Stileman's Works in Wickford, Essex. In mid-1906 the works and its contents were auctioned under the order of the executors of the late T. Dowsett (who was the first mayor of Southend, and an extremely wealthy man). This sale included six traction engines and 21 Darby Land Diggers.

== First version ==
In effect the machine was an early tractor designed mainly for ploughing, and could accomplish 1-acre (4,000 m^{2}) an hour (1 m^{2}/s) to a maximum depth of 14 inches (360 mm). This first digger was constructed on pedestrian principles and had six "feet" and really did walk over the fields. It jumped too much to be really successful. The digger was later modified to have wheels in place of the legs. This machine pre-dated the Ivel tractor built by Dan Albone of Biggleswade in 1902 which he started designing in 1896. The Ivel tractor is generally considered to be the first British tractor with an internal combustion engine.

Robert Hasler was born in Pleshey in 1856; he worked as an engineer for Thomas Darby for 26 years, then became the village blacksmith (following his father) until he retired in 1925. At the age of 19 he was badly kicked by a horse, and this necessitated one of his legs being amputated.

== Second version ==
The second version was known as the Darby Broadside Digger which was a larger machine which had eight legs and wheels and a double boiler having a smoke-box and chimney at each end.

== Third version ==
The third version was more like a conventional traction engine with the digger attached behind - it had spades that dug into the ground and turned the soil over.

This was built by Coopers of King's Lynn. One is thought to survive but it is hidden away. The factory is still known as "The Digger".
