= John Darby (printer) =

English printer (died 1704)

- Died: 1704
- Occupation: Printer

John Darby (died 1704) was an English printer.

He was associated with the Whigs and printed many works by Whig authors. These included Andrew Marvell's An Account of the Growth of Popery and Arbitrary Government in 1677–1678 and during the rest of the Exclusion Crisis he helped keep Whig arguments in circulation. Other notable works that came from his press include Algernon Sidney's Discourses Concerning Government and Edmund Ludlow's Memoirs.
