= Joseph Darby (jumper) =

English jumper

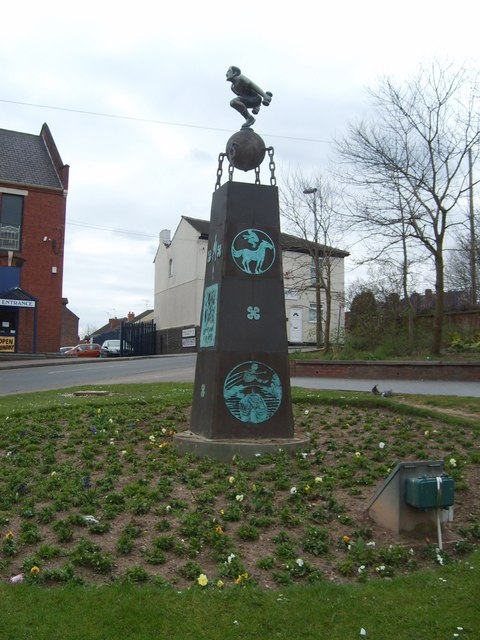
- Statue of Joseph Darby in Netherton

Personal information
- Born: 6 August 1861 Netherton, Dudley, Worcestershire, England
- Died: 22 December 1937 (aged 76) Dudley, Worcestershire, England
- Height: 5 ft 8¼ in
- Weight: 175 lb (79 kg)

Sport
- Sport: Athletics
- Events: standing high jump, standing long jump and multiple jumps from standing start.

Achievements and titles
- Personal best: sHJ – 12 ft 2 ½ in(1889)

Joseph Darby (6 August 1861 – 22 December 1937) was a renowned English jumper from the Black Country village of Netherton, in Dudley, Worcestershire. He specialised in spring jumping (jumping starting from a stationary position) often using weights in his hands to help propel him. After taking part in competitive jumping at venues in the Midlands and North of England in the 1880s, he went on to perform at theatres in London and Paris and crossed the Atlantic to exhibit in North America. He entertained crowds by performing trick jumps and earned money in wagers with competitors. Highlights in his career included defeating the American World Champion spring-jumper in 1887 and appearing before the future King Edward VII in Covent Garden, London. After finishing his jumping career, he became a publican in his hometown.

== Early life ==
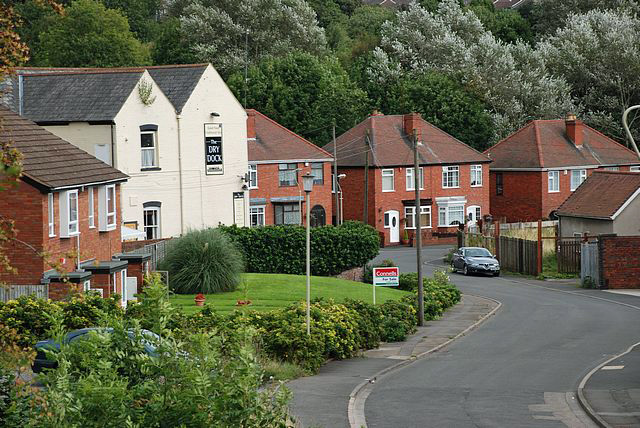
Windmill End, pictured in 2011

Joseph Darby was born in Windmill End, Netherton, on 6 August 1861. His parents were Abraham Darby, a maker of nails for shoeing horses, and Martha Darby (née Foley).

When interviewed in 1889 he said that he had only received ten months' schooling at the most "and only half-time at that." He also said that he started work at the age of seven, making nails. When asked when he started jumping he replied "I was always at it when a bit of a kiddy, jumping against the other lads, and I could always beat them fair and easy."

According to an interview he gave whilst on a tour in the U.S., he commenced his working life making nails for horseshoes, before working in a colliery and subsequently unloading boats.

== Early sporting career ==
At the age of 18 he took up athletics, firstly as a professional runner over distances of 100 and 120 yards. He reportedly had success as a runner, competing 22 times and only suffering one defeat. He took up competitive jumping when aged 20 or 21. He specialised in spring-jumping where he launched himself from a standing position. He often used dumbbell-shaped weights in his hands to help propel himself for the spring jumps.

In a promotional pamphlet produced by Darby or his agent, the first competitive jump listed is a defeat of T. Hartshorn of Netherton for a £20 wager. This competition took place at the Lea Brook Grounds, Wednesbury on 8 January 1883. The contest involved a sequence of 5 standing jumps and Darby beat Hartshorn by over 2 ft., covering a distance of 20 yards 1in.

Darby's next jumping competition took place on 14 May 1883, at the same sporting grounds as for his first competition, and was against W. Hughes of Kates Hill, Dudley. Darby again proved the winner in a contest where he took 15 "rising jumps" against his opponents 15 "rising hops".

Darby's third contest was against Kirk of Ilkstone, Derbyshire, again at the Lea Brook Grounds on 24 September 1883. In his third victory, this time for £40 stakes, Darby jumped 35 ft. 8in. in a sequence of three spring jumps.

Darby now took a break from competition, working as a collier and unloader of canal boats, only returning to jumping in November 1885 when he defeated W. Fillingham of Wigan, Lancashire for £100 at the Queen's Ground, Barnsley.

On 7 December 1885, Darby lost a match to Tom Pollitt of Openshaw at the Moorfield Grounds near Manchester. For the contest, involving two forward spring jumps, Pollitt jumped first and was given a 12in start. Darby was unable to reach his opponent's mark after three jumps and so Pollitt won the £20 stake money.

On 27 February 1886, Darby took on and beat John Holland of Middleton, the contest taking place at the Moorfield Grounds, Failsworth, near Manchester. For the contest, Darby took 7 forward stand jumps against Holland's "five run hops and a jump". At this time, Darby was being trained by T. Walker of the Windmill Inn. Darby won the contest by 12 inches.

Subsequent victories for Darby were recorded. On 26 April 1886, he avenged his previous defeat by Tom Pollitt. The event took place at the Moorfield Grounds, Failworth near Manchester for total stakes of £100. The competition involved 4 standing jumps, with Pollitt being given a yard start.

On 19 March 1887, he defeated William Brown of Leeds, Yorkshire, for £50, the jumping completion taking place at the Cardigan Grounds, Leeds. The competition involved Darby taking ten forward spring jumps against Brown's nine hops and a jump, Darby's winning margin being 3in despite Brown being given a 1-yard start.

On 30 April 1887, he defeated Bill Brown of Bradford for £50 at the Victoria Grounds, Wolverhampton, the event involving two backward jumps.

On 2 July 1887 he defeated Thomas Burrows, of Nelson, Lancashire, for £50 a-side. The competition took place at the Moorfield Grounds, Failsworth and involved Darby taking seven standing forward spring jumps against Burrows' six run hops and a jump. Darby won the contest by 3 ft 5¾in.

On 29 October 1887, Darby was beaten by Daniel Dearden of Haydock, at the Swan Inn Grounds, St. Helens. For the competition, involving three jumps, Dearden had the advantage of using weights whilst Darby jumped without. However, Darby was given a two feet start.

=== Defeat of the American jumper Hamilton ===
Between December 1887 and March 1888, he defeated George W. Hamilton, (Note: The American jumper's name is spelt Hamlington in some publications.) then the World Champion spring-jumper in three competitive matches. Hamilton, born in Frederica, New York on 28 October 1856, had jumped 14 ft 5½in with weights at Rome, Michigan, USA on 3 October 1879. The American had come to England with Buffalo Bill's Wild West Show, in which he performed under the guise of "Mustang Jack". The first meeting was at the Moorfield Grounds, Manchester on 24 December 1887. The match was for £100 a-side stake money and involved ten forward spring jumps with the use of weights. Darby won the match comfortably in front of around 600 spectators, leaping over 4 ft. 5in. beyond the American's mark. The second of these meetings took place at the Leabrook Grounds, Wednesbury on 21 January 1888. At this match, the jumpers competed for £100 a side, each jumper alternately performing two stand spring forward jumps. It was reported that Darby was trained for the competition by his own brother Abel of the Malt Shovel Inn, Dudley. Darby won this competition by a distance of 2 ft 6in. For the third meeting, which took place on 10 March 1888 at the Moorfield Grounds, Manchester, the American was given a 6-inch start for the contest which involved two stand spring forward jumps but he failed three times to match Darby's distance. Darby's feats led to him being presented with championship belts including one proclaiming him to be champion of the world, which was awarded at the Dudley Fetes in 1889.

Two of his championship belts and other memorabilia are on display at Dudley Museum

On 21 April 1888, Darby avenged his previous defeat by Daniel Dearden at a competition held at the Larkhill Grounds, Farnsworth. The event, for stakes of £50 a-side, involved three forward spring jumps. Darby jumped 39 ft. 2in. and Dearden was only able to land two inches behind Darby's mark despite being given a 2 ft start.

== Stage performer and sportsman ==
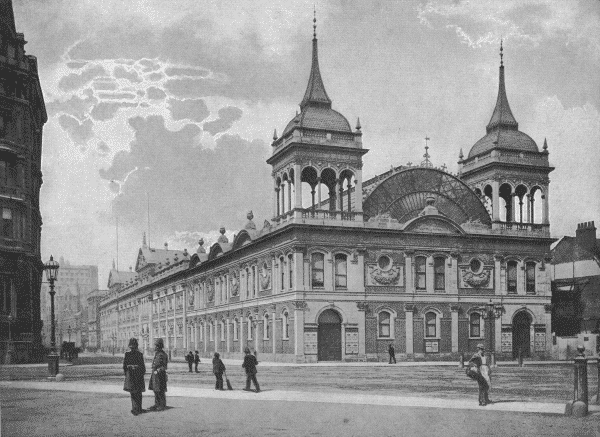
Joseph Darby topped the bill at the Royal Aquarium, London in November and December, 1888

On 6 February 1888, Joseph Darby appeared at Bingley Hall, Birmingham as part of a testimonial benefit evening given in honour of the boxer Jem Carney.

On 10 September 1888, Darby appeared in his home village at the Friendly Societies Gala on Netherton Cricket Ground in front of 4,000 people including the local MP, Brooke Robinson. After performing a number of trick jumps, Darby then broke the record for 20 successive spring jumps that had stood at 79yards 6in., although he only required 17 jumps to pass this distance, leaping 81 yards, 1 ft 6in in the process.

According to an interview he gave in a French newspaper, Darby's first stage appearance before a paying public took place in October 1888, when he jumped at the Canterbury Music Hall in London again as part of a performance given for the benefit of the boxer, Jem Carney. For the performance, which took place on 18 October 1888, in front of over 3,700 spectators, Darby took the stage after several boxing bouts had been completed and reportedly "gave the most marvellous display of jumping feats ever seen on a Metropolitan stage".

On 29 October 1888, Darby appeared at the Grand Circus, adjoining the Molineux Grounds, Wolverhampton. Despite losing his jumping clogs on the way to the venue, he still "succeeded in astonishing those present".

From 5 November 1888 to 12 January 1889, Joseph Darby performed at the Royal Aquarium, a place of entertainment in London. On his debut, he took to the stage clad in a white singlet and scarlet trousers before starting with a jump over a chair from a brick placed on end without knocking over the brick. As part of his show at the Royal Aquarium, he challenged all-comers to compete with him for a bet of between £50 and £1000. In the newspaper advertisement for his performance, 17 separate trick jumps were listed, including forwards, backwards and sideways jumps over chairs; jumping off and onto bricks placed on end without knocking them down; jumping onto and off a man's face without hurting him; jumping onto and off a seated man's head without hurting him; jumping onto a man's hat and off again without doing any damage and jumping over a horse. In addition he stated that he would break jumping records set by anyone in the world.

It was reported that during his performances at the Royal Aquarium, Darby suffered a serious injury whilst jumping over tables, snapping ligaments above and below the knee.

=== Awarded championship belt ===
On 11 and 12 June 1889, Joseph Darby performed at the Dudley Castle Fetes. After his display of jumping, he was awarded a belt by Alderman Walker of Dudley Council. The belt, made of silver and with enamelled pictures on it was stated to be of £70 value and was made by Messrs. Elkington and Co. Limited of Birmingham. The money for the belt was raised by subscription and included an enameled picture of Dudley Castle, crossed dumb-bells on ivy leaves, representations of Darby as a jumper, red cornelians mounted on gilded bosses, and the jumper's monogram.

In 1889, he wrote to the editor of the Sporting Life newspaper, challenging the jumper Jose Parker to a contest for stakes between £50 and £200, with the gate money to be used for the benefit of the Guest Hospital, Dudley. The two jumpers competed in May 1890 at Dudley Castle Grounds before a crowd estimated at over 20,000. Darby's jumping pupil Short also competed at the event, which involved a variety of stand jumps. Darby won all of the events.

In November 1889, it was reported that he had broken three jumping records at the Ashton-Under-Lyne Skating Rink towards the end of October. In the single stand jump without weights, he achieved 11 ft. 8½in., beating the record by 7½in. He also broke the record for two stand jumps and for the high jump by clearing 5 ft. 6in.

On 30 November 1889, a newspaper advertisement stated that he was playing to packed houses and that he had only one available open date for the rest of the year. His sole agent was stated to be John Taylor of Windmill End, Dudley.

In December 1889, Darby was being billed as the "Champion Jumper of the Word", the "Ninth Wonder of the World" and as the "Flying Man".

In 1890 it was reported that: "Darby goes through no exceptional training unless for a special contest. He keeps himself trim by a little boxing, careful dietary, and keeping clear of alcohol almost to the extent of teetotalism."

=== Performs in England, Ireland and Scotland ===
In early May 1890, Darby was performing at Dan Lowrey's Star Theatre in Dublin. Darby's shoes were kept on display at the theatre bar in order to show they contained no springs.

In the middle of May 1890, Darby performed at the Bradford and West Riding Gala held at Peel Park, Bradford.

On 28 May 1890, at a competition held in conjunction with the Dudley Castle Fetes, Darby jumped 14 ft 2in in a single jump with weights, beating the English record.

In June 1890, Darby performed at the annual sports meeting held at the Netherton Cricket Club's ground.

In late December of the same year he performed at Mr. Moss' Xmas and New Year Carnival held at Waverley Market, Edinburgh.

On 14 June 1891, Darby made a return to competitive jumping, defeating Temple Jones of Bolton at the Belle Vue Gardens, Stockton.

In February 1892, Darby was performing at Rowland's Circus, Wolverhampton, where his act included jumping 36 feet in three jumps ending with a jump over a chair placed on a table; jumping over a tank of water, lowering his feet to touch the surface of the water as he passed over the tank and springing over eight chairs placed back to back. It was at this venue where Darby performed one of his most famous trick jumps: that of clearing a full sized billiard table (minus cushions). In fact, an authentic billiard table was not available at the occasion, so a dummy table was erected. Darby was hampered in his attempt by lack of space and could only take two stand spring jumps prior to leaping the table, which he succeeded in doing on his fifth attempt.

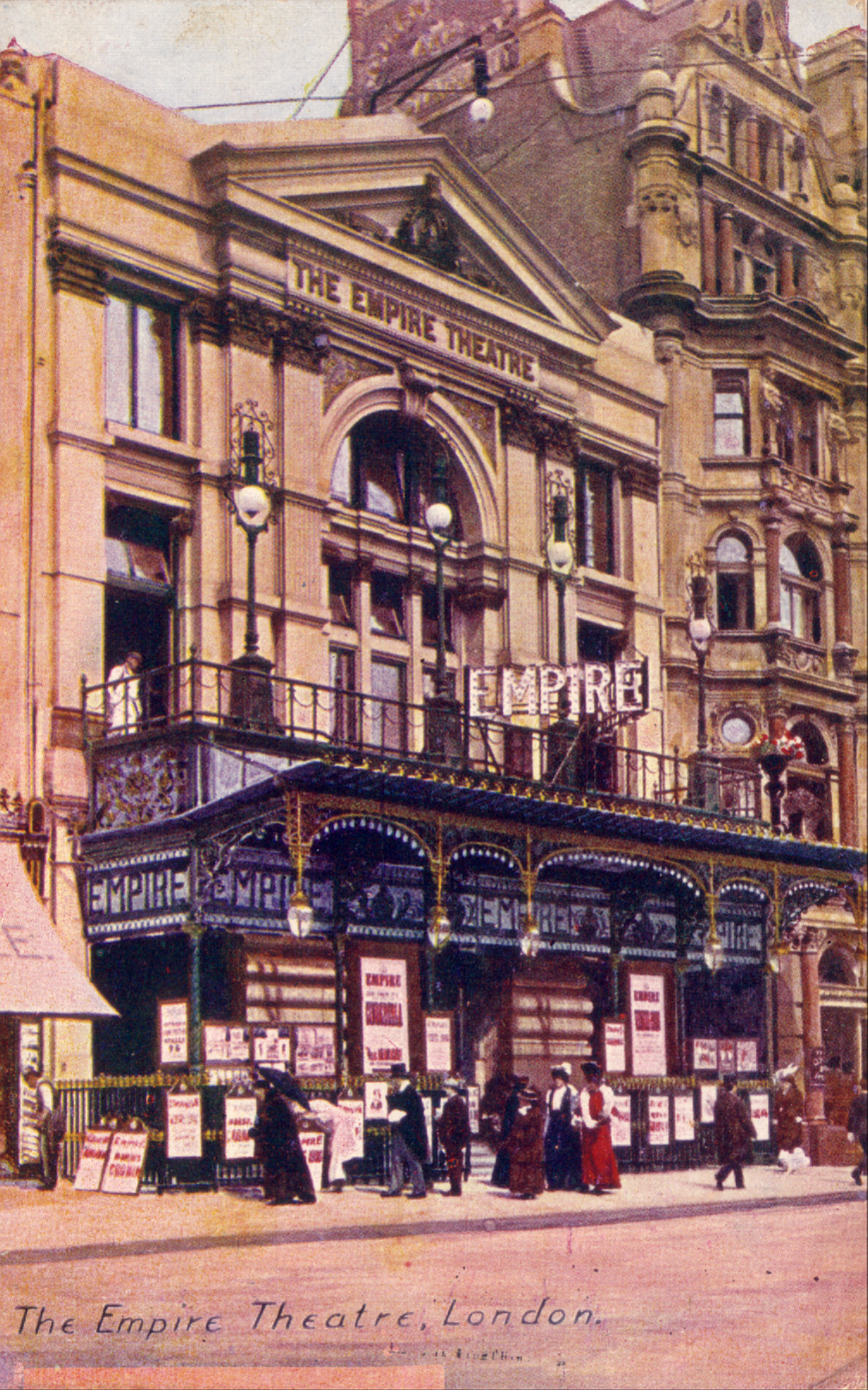
In 1892, Joseph Darby appeared at the Empire Theatre, Leicester Square on the same bill as the celebrated musical-hall performer Marie Lloyd

In October 1892 he performed as part of a variety show at the Empire Theatre, London alongside the celebrated musical-hall performer, Marie Lloyd. George Bernard Shaw attended one of the performances and wrote: "Now is it not odd that at a music-hall to which, perhaps, half the audience have come to hear Marie Lloyd sing Twiggy voo, boys, twiggy voo? or to see Mr Darby jump a ten-barred gate, you get real stage art". According to an American newspaper: "English athletes are just now flocking to the Empire theater, London, to witness the high and broad jumping feats of Joseph Darby, the champion jumper and holder of the championship belt." The same source reported: "one of his favorite tricks is to place six chairs in a row and spring from a brick at one end of the line to a corresponding brick at the other. His flying feats include a leap over a chair placed on a table and over eight chairs in a row, a length of eighteen feet. He goes over a horse seventeen hands high with his ankles tied. Among his phenomenal performances are a backward spring over three chairs and a leap over a tank of water ten feet long, during which he lightly skims the water with his foot. His most unique feat is a jump over a chair, alighting on a man's face and jumping back again without injuring his assistant. As the latter is generally a choice specimen of the London tough the escape of his cheek is not to be wondered at. Darby concludes his sensational performance with a leap over a six-foot hurdle lined at the top with a bristling row of spikes."

In November 1892, a newspaper reported that he had won over £30,000 in jumping matches.

In January 1893, an Australian newspaper acclaimed Darby with the words: "no athlete can boast of such a brilliant record of achievements in his own particular department as Mr Darby, who for the last eleven years can show an unbroken series of triumphs gained with the utmost ease from those pseudo-champion jumpers of all countries who have considered themselves foemen worthy of his steel." The same source stated: "Mr Darby is a married man, thirty-one years of age, and is living at a small village about two miles from Dudley, in Worcestershire, in the same house in which he was born and brought up."

On 22 July 1893, Darby took on another remarkable jumper of the age, John (Jack) Higgins of Blackburn. The competition was held at the Moorfield Ground, Failsworth and involved both athletes performing a "hop, two strides and a jump" for a stake of £100. On the day, Higgins broke the world record for this event and Darby was defeated.

=== Performs in France, Germany and North America ===
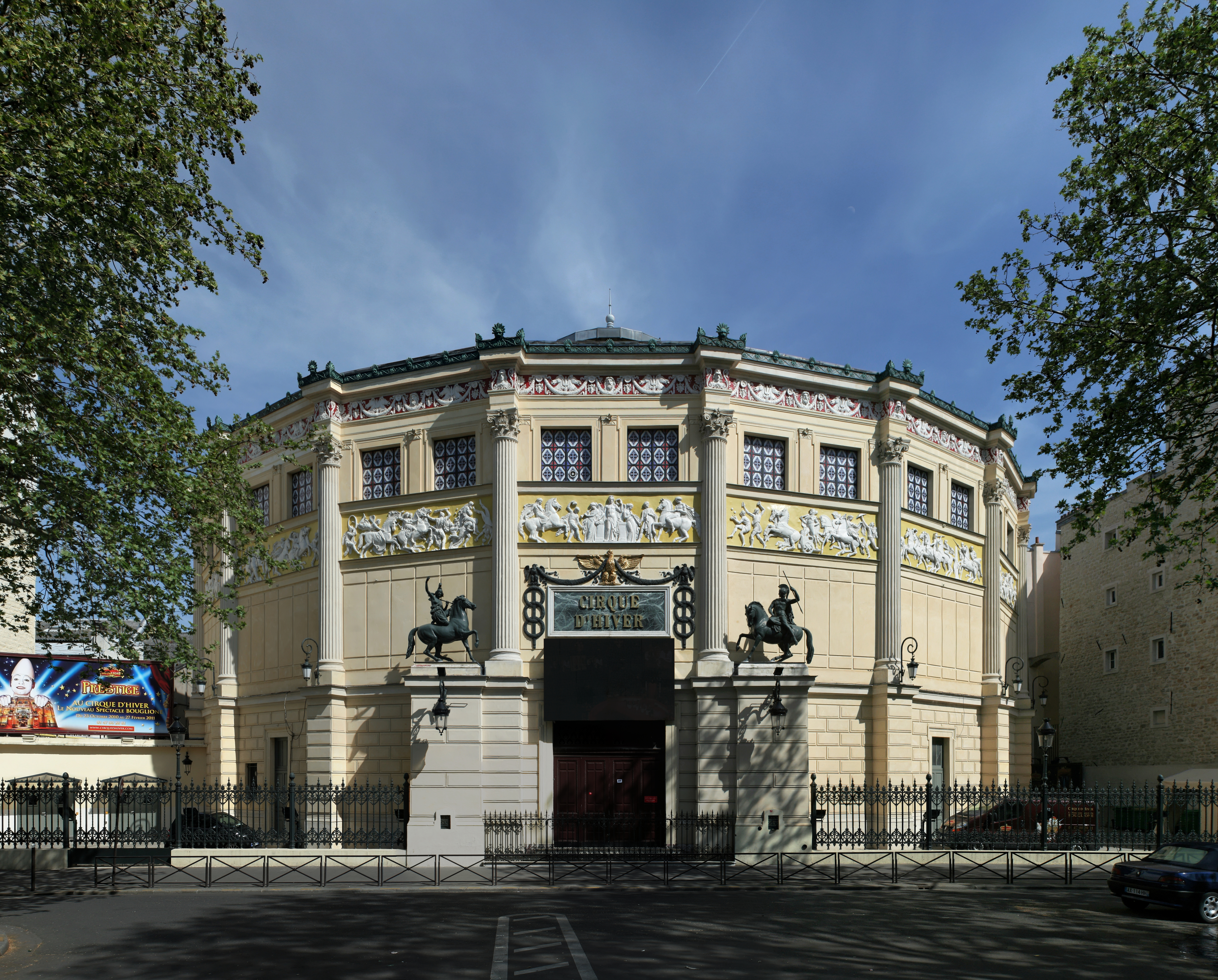
In October 1893, Joseph Darby performed at the Cirque d'Hiver in Paris

On 23 September 1893, it was reported that Darby was in his fifth week at an engagement at the "Winter Gardens" in Berlin

In October 1893, Darby performed at the Cirque d'Hiver in Paris.

Later in the same month, he was described as the 'greatest phenomenon in the jumping line in the world' by the Montreal Daily Witness as he set out on a tour of the US. The same source described him as being 5 ft 8¼ in tall with a 40 in chest, weighing 175 lb. In addition, it was stated that 'the muscle of his arm measures 15½ in, and the thick of the leg 28 in but the calf is remarkable for its iron quality rather than anything else'. He reportedly set out for the US on 21 October 1893. arriving aboard the RMS Umbria at New York on October 30. In November 1893, he issued a challenge to "jump any man either backward or forward with or without weights for from $5,000 to $10,000 a side".

In October and November 1893, Darby was performing with a troupe in the play "The Country Circus" at the Grand Opera House, Brooklyn. The opening night was on 30 October 1893. Later the troupe performed the play at other venues: on 26 December 1893, Darby performed at the Olympic, St Louis and in January 1894, the troupe had moved on to Washington, where they performed at Albaugh's.

Darby returned to England in February 1894, again taking the steamer Umbria for the crossing. After his arrival at Liverpool with his manager, Jack Jones, on 17 February 1894, Darby went on to Dudley where he received an "enthusiastic reception".

In April 1894, whilst performing at Ohmy's Grand Circus, Longton, Darby issued a challenge for all comers to compete for between £500 and £1000 a-side with a choice of between 1 and 20 jumps. Darby offered competitors a 5 ft start over 10 jumps and 10 ft start over 20 jumps.

In May 1894, Darby was performing at Hengler's Grand Cirque, Rotunda Gardens, Dublin

In June and July 1894, Darby was performing in Paris again, this time at the Cirque d'Été.

=== Second championship belt and sporting retirement ===
Darby announced his retirement from competitive jumping (although not from exhibitions) on 23 July 1894 after winning a competition held at Dudley Castle Grounds. The Manchester Sporting Chronicle awarded Darby a Championship belt as a result of winning this contest. The belt was presented at the conclusion of the two day sports fête by the Earl of Dudley.

=== Further performances ===
In March 1895, he interrupted a tour of France to appear at the Empire Theatre, Coventry, the stage having been specially strengthened for his act.

In a newspaper interview given in May 1895, Darby stated that he had performed in "France, Germany, Holland, in fact nearly all over the Continent". He also stated that he had performed in front of royalty in many nations, including the Prince of Wales. According to an obituary article, written much later, a special command performance had been arranged before the Prince of Wales by Lord Arthur Somerset at Evans' Rooms, Covent Garden.

In August 1895, Darby gave performances at Tudor's Circus in Cambridge.

In December 1897, Darby had a benefit performance at Walsall, taking on local jumper Arthur Boyce. For this match, it was decided that Boyce would jump in a forward direction without weights against Darby jumping backwards with weights. Before the match started, Darby entertained the crowds by leaping over a horse-drawn carriage. A newspaper reported on the event : "on Darby entering the arena he met with a magnificent reception. A covered brougham was brought from the nearest cab stand, and at the second attempt, amid deafening cheers, Darby was over like a bird." Darby went on to win the match.

In 1898, he featured in a short film made by Riley Brothers entitled 'Joe Darby in his Various Jumps'. The film showed Darby "leaping the horse - Jumping over a man and just touching his face - Jumping over water and just skimming the surface - Jumping over a large number of chairs placed near together - &c. &c."

On 30 August 1898, Darby suffered an injury whilst attempting to jump over a brougham at Scarborough, catching the top of the carriage as he passed over and falling forward onto his head.

In September 1898, Darby was back in Paris, performing at the Casino de Paris on a bill including boxers, dancers and cyclists.

=== Brief return to competitive jumping and final performances ===
On 12 November 1898, Darby briefly returned to competitive jumping when he took on Thomas Colquitt of St Helens at the Wellington Grounds, Bury, in front of 2000 spectators. The competition involved a sequence of 10 forward spring jumps without weights. Colquitt won the event and the £100 stake.

On the plinth of his statue in Netherton, it is recorded that on 19 November 1898 he was summoned for a 'Royal Command Performance' at Covent Garden where he performed in front of the Prince of Wales, the future King Edward VII.

In March 1899, Darby was again performing at the Cirque d'Hiver in Paris, where his performance included leaping over a horse-drawn carriage.

In August 1899, Darby was reported as appearing at the "Milford Flower Show and Sports", where his performance included jumping over a cab and over 14 chairs.

In July 1900, Darby performed again at the Milford Flower Show, when it was reported that he was unable to do one of his most popular jumps, leaping over a cab, because the vehicle did not arrive in time. It was also reported that his 9-year-old son made his debut at this event.

== Career after jumping ==
Despite Darby's fame, he never lived far from his birthplace in Netherton. In 1900 he was listed by a local trade directory with the profession of "Champion Jumper", living at 23 High Street, Netherton.

In later life he became the landlord of the Albion Inn, Stone Street, Dudley. He advertised on 9 June 1900 that he had taken over this pub and he was listed as being a "Licensed Victualler" there from 1901 onwards. In September 1900 it was reported that he had entered a lion's cage set up on Dudley Market Place in order to settle a bet of £10.

In 1934, Darby attended the civic reception given to the Dudley-born Wimbledon tennis champion, Dorothy Round.

He died in Dudley on 22 December 1937.

== Jumps ==
Joseph Darby performed his jumps at a number of venues including sports grounds, circuses and concert halls. He received money for performing, often from betting on the outcome of competitions with other jumpers. The jumps themselves involved forwards and backwards spring jumps (often multiple jumps) and high jumps. In addition to competitive jumping, Darby developed a repertoire of "trick jumps" for entertainment purposes. Some of these jumps were over obstacles such as chairs at regular spacings. Others required dexterity such as taking off or landing on a brick. He also developed the ability to briefly touch down his feet before his actual landing, which made possible some of his more famous "trick jumps". For one such trick jump, a volunteer would lie on the ground in the path of the jump and Joseph Darby would appear to land on and jump off the person's face. Another such trick jump would involve jumping over a tank of water and briefly touching the surface of the water with his shoes.

To achieve jumps of greater distances or heights, Darby would sometimes employ dumb-bell shaped weights held in both hands. These could be used to provide extra momentum. It was reported in 1893 that he was using weights of 9 lb each. It was also reported that he made his jumps wearing steel-tipped clogs, albeit "very thin and beautifully made" ones. However it was reported that when jumping in a backwards direction he wore pumps.

Darby's single forward spring-jump of 12 ft 2 ½ in, achieved without weights on 24 October 1889, stands comparison with the best achieved since then. The world (amateur) record for this event when it was still an Olympic sport in the early 20th century was 3.47m (about 11 ft 4 ½ in) achieved on 3 September 1904 by Ray Ewry.

Some of his most famous achievements include: jumping over a full sized billiard table, a six-foot high jump performed with ankles tied, and leaping over a horse 13 hands high.

=== Long and high jumps ===
Joseph Darby's jumping record can be found in a number of sporting annuals from his era. In the Police Gazette Sporting Annual for 1897, Joseph Darby is listed as holding the following professional jumping records:

Standing High Jump — 6 ft, with ankles firmly bound together, achieved on 13 June 1892.

Standing High Jump with weights — 6 ft 3 in, at the third stand jump, achieved on 6 November 1891.

Standing Back Jump — 12 ft 11 in, achieved on 14 September 1891.

Standing Wide Jump (with weights) — 14 ft 9 in, achieved on 19 September 1890;

Standing Wide Jump(without weights) 12 ft 2 ½ in, achieved on 24 October 1889.

Running High Jump — 6 ft 5 ½ in, achieved on 5 February 1892

Longest Flying Jump (third of three stands) — 16 ft 4 in, achieved on 8 November 1888.

Two Standing Jumps (with 19 lb weights) — 28 ft, achieved on 6 November 1891.

Three Standing Jumps with weights — 42 ft 6 in, achieved on 4 March 1892;

Three Standing Jumps (without weights), 35 ft 11 in, achieved on 6 November 1891.

Four Forward Spring Jumps (with weights) — 56 ft 2 in, achieved on 19 August 1889.

Five Forward Jumps (with weights) — 76 ft 3 in, achieved on 19 August 1889.

Five Forward Jumps (without weights) 61 ft 5 ½ in, achieved on 28 May 1890.

Seven Standing Jumps (with weights) — 96 ft 4 in, achieved on 2 Julv 1887.

Ten Standing Jumps (with weights) — 137 ft 7 in, achieved on 10 August 1889.

Six Back Spring Jumps (with weights) — 58 ft, achieved on 13 June 1892.

Stand, Two Hops and Jump (with weights)— 36 ft 7 in, achieved on 14 March 1891.

Stand, Five Hops and Jump — 71 ft 3 ½ in, achieved on 11 June 1892.

Three Backward Jumps — 30 ft 9 in, achieved on 26 October 1894.

=== Trick Jumps ===
The Pittsburgh Press in November 1893 listed the following jumps in Darby's repertoire:

Jumps over twenty chairs placed ten feet apart.

Jumps over six chairs in one jump.

Clears two chairs 18 ft apart.

Jumps off one brick, end up, over a chair, lands on another brick end up, and backwards without knocking the bricks down.

Jumps on to a man's face while lying down and off again without hurting the man.

Jumps 36 ft in three successive jumps and in the third jump lands on a man's back, whilst he is lying across the edge of two chairs, and off again without hurting him.

Jumps off one brick, end up, over a horse 15 hands high.

Darby's leap over a full sized billiard table lengthwise in Wolverhampton was mentioned in several editions of the Guinness Book of World Records. For this jump he took a running start and leapt from a 4 in wooden block, clearing the 12 ft long, 2 ft 10 in high table in one bound. This was achieved on 5 February 1892.

In 1893, a Canadian newspaper reported that: "he has thirty-nine feats in his performance or act, the most sensational of which is his great water jump, representing a jump from England to America. In accomplishing this feat he will alight on the water and off again without wetting the upper leather of his boots. This marvellous feat has never been accomplished by any artist in this world." More detail of this jump was given in an Australian publication: "a tank is set in the middle of the stage, and is filled to the brim with water. Mr Darby takes a flying leap, and as he passes over the water be descends slightly. By this downward motion he, as it were, alights on the top of the water, and flies off again without wetting the upper leather of his boots." When asked how he managed this feat, he replied: "I really don't know, it comes naturally to me, though when I think of it myself it seems almost an impossibility."

== The 'Spring-heeled Jack' Legend ==
Joseph Darby has been linked to the Spring-heeled Jack legend. In Victorian times, the legendary character known as 'Spring-heeled Jack' was reportedly spotted at a number of locations in Britain, including the Black Country. The creature was often described as having blazing eyes and had the ability to leap great distances. Joseph Darby supposedly started a local 'Spring-heeled Jack' scare when he was spotted practising his jumping by leaping over a local canal at night time, using a miner's lighted helmet to see his way.

== Commemoration ==
Joseph Darby is commemorated by a statue in the centre of his native town of Netherton. The statue shows Darby in a crouched position about to leap holding weights in either hand. It is mounted on a plinth which describes some of his exploits. The statue, designed by Steve Field and fabricated by D.R. Harvey, was installed on 29 November 1991.

There is an exhibition of Joe Darby memorabilia in Dudley Museum at the Archives, including his championship belts. Joseph Darby is also commemorated in a bronze plaque set into the pavement of Dudley's marketplace as part of the "Dudley Time Trail" designed by Dudley borough artist, Steve Field.

A radio play, entitled, "The Astounding Joseph Darby" written by John Edgar and directed by Nigel Bryant was broadcast on BBC Radio 4 on 4 July 1991.
