= Church of St Andrew, Netherton =

St Andrew's, Netherton
- Parish Church of Saint Andrew
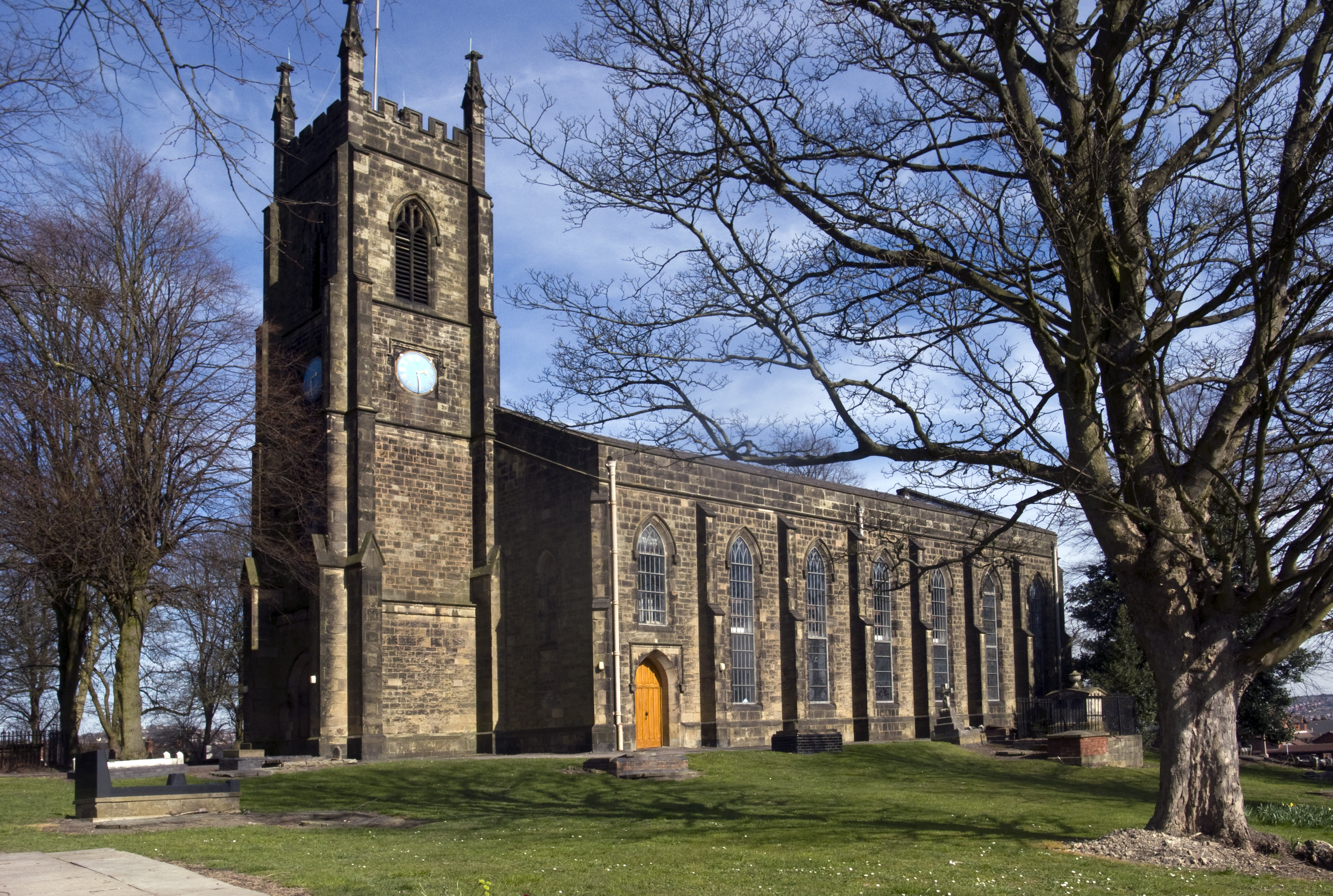
- St Andrew's church is situated on top of Netherton Hill
- St Andrew's, Netherton
- 52.4908°N 2.0925°W
- OS grid reference: SO 93820 88098
- Location: Netherton, West Midlands
- Country: England
- Denomination: Anglican
- Website: www.forgechurches.com/st-andrews-netherton

History
- Status: Parish church
- Founded: 1830
- Dedication: Saint Andrew

Architecture
- Functional status: Active
- Heritage designation: Grade II Listed
- Designated: 1 August 1997
- Architect: Thomas Lee
- Style: Early English
- Years built: 1827-1830
- Construction cost: £8,000

Specifications
- Materials: Gornal stone, brick

Administration
- Province: Canterbury
- Diocese: Worcester
- Archdeaconry: Dudley
- Parish: Netherton; St Andrew

Clergy
- Bishop(s): Martin Gorick, Bishop of Dudley
- Vicar: Richard Hackett

The Church of St Andrew, Netherton is an Anglican parish church situated in Netherton in the Metropolitan Borough of Dudley. The building was designed by Thomas Lee and it opened in 1830. In 1844 it became the parish church for Netherton.

== History ==
Netherton, like many Black Country industrial areas contained many non-conformist chapels. It did not have an Anglican church until 16 July 1830, when St Andrew's was consecrated and opened by the Lord Bishop of Worcester. The foundation stone of the church had been laid by Dr. Booker, the Vicar of Dudley, on 30 November 1827. The building, designed by Thomas Lee, was a Commissioners' church funded by parliament. It was constructed in the Early English style and cost £8000 to complete. The land on which the church was built was donated by the Earl of Dudley. The churchyard contains the mass unmarked graves of the victims of cholera that struck Dudley in 1831 and 1832.

It was originally just a chapel of ease to Church of St Thomas, Dudley, only becoming Netherton's parish church on 1 December 1844. The first incumbent vicar was the Rev. F. S. Bradshaw, appointed in 1845.

The church underwent restoration in 1862. Furnishings added in the late 19th century and early 20th century include a font, an alabaster reredos, a pulpit, a wrought iron screen and a lectern.

In February 1908, a pinnacle was blown over causing £300 worth of damage to the west end of the church.

A vestry was added to the east end of the church in 1938.

The building is Grade II listed.

== Situation ==
St Andrew's is situated on Netherton Hill at the highest point in Netherton. The church is surrounded by the gravestones of many of the former residents of the area. The main entrance is from Highbridge Road.

== Description ==
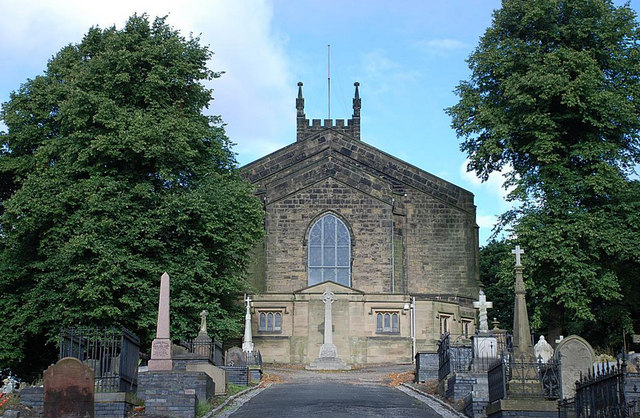
View of the church from the entrance on Highbridge Road

The church has been described as "a very good example of an almost unaltered Commissioners' church". It was constructed in Early English style. It is of brick construction with Gornal stone (sandstone) facing and a slate roof. A tower with four pinnacles stands at the west end of the church.

Inside, the church is 98 feet in length and 54 feet in width with a gallery on the north, west and south sides. The organ, supplied by T. H. Harrison of Rochdale is at the north east end of the gallery. The gallery is supported by iron pillars.

Furnishings include the original wooden box pews. The oak altar, designed by the vicar, S. J. Marriot, was installed on New Year's Eve, 1887.

The clock, supplied by Bensons of London and installed in the tower, was partially funded by sports events held at the nearby Netherton Cricket Ground.

== Diocese ==
The church is part of the Diocese of Worcester. It is under the authority of the Bishop of Dudley, Martin Gorick and the Venerable Nikki Groarke, Archdeacon of Dudley. The incumbent vicar is Rev Richard Hackett.
