= Ocker Hill =

Residential area in the West Midlands, England

Coordinates: 52.542°N 2.040°W

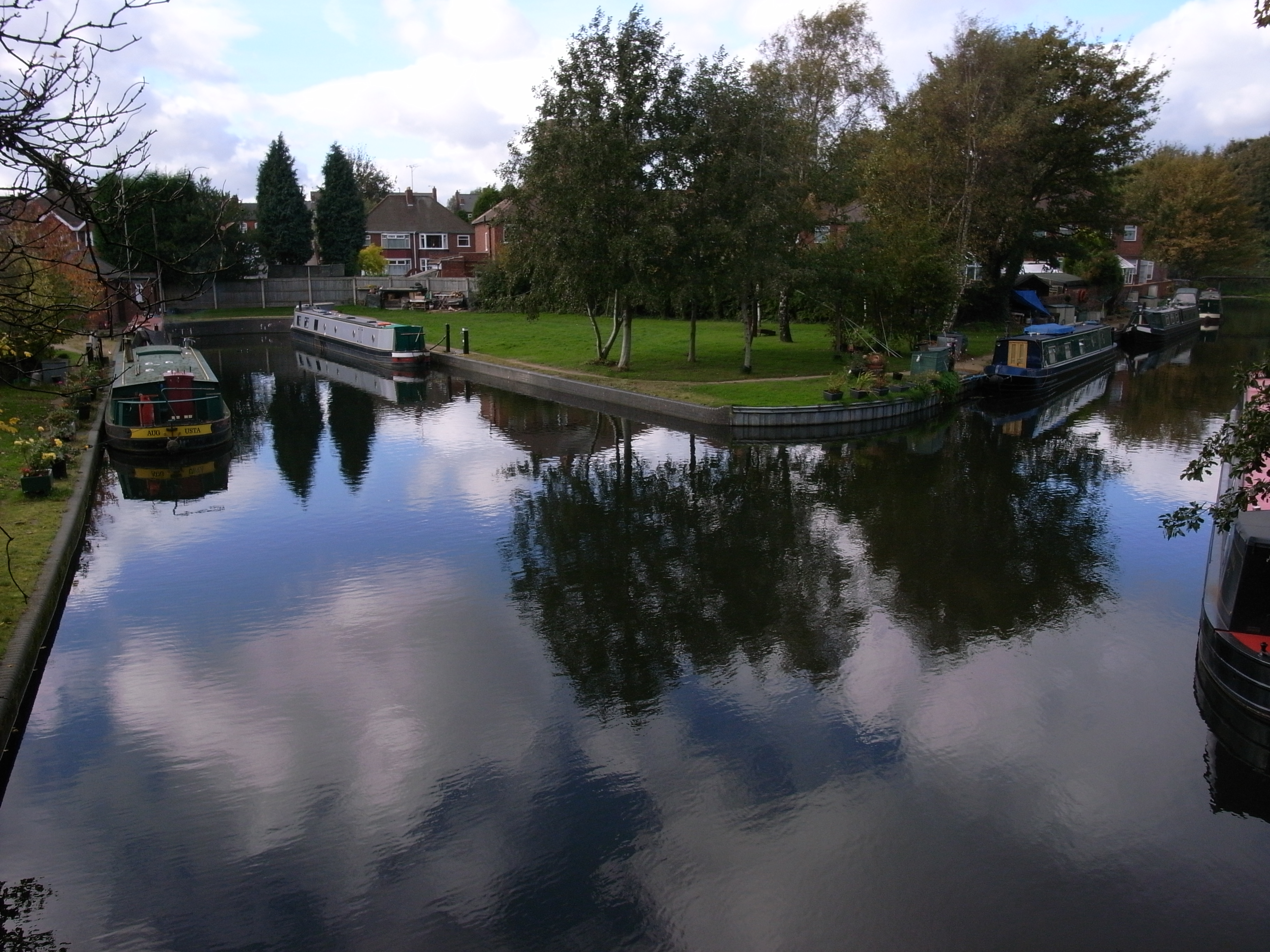
Canal moorings on the Ocker Hill Tunnel Branch, the lower of two canals built towards the pumping station at Ocker Hill

Ocker Hill is a residential area straddling the border of Tipton and Wednesbury in the West Midlands of England.

== Details ==
It is situated in the northern part of the town, on the Leabrook Road, between Dudley and Wednesbury. The area was first developed during the first half of the 19th century as Tipton became extensively developed for industry during the Industrial Revolution. It is split between the three Sandwell council wards of Princes End, Great Bridge, and Wednesbury South.

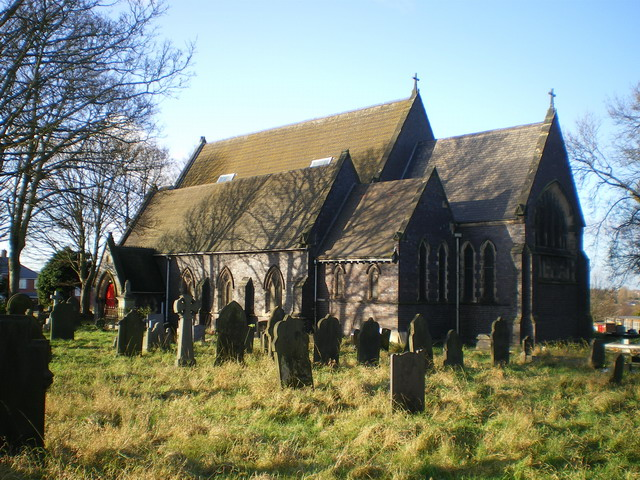
St Mark's Church

St. Mark's parish church was built in 1849 to serve the newly developed area, and is still in existence today.

A landmark in Ocker Hill was the Ocker Hill Power Station electric power station off Leabrook Road, which included three cooling towers. The cooling towers were recognisable for miles around, but they were levelled in 1985. Housing has since been built on the site. The original power station, fired by coal, opened in 1902 and closed in 1977.

Ocker Hill railway station opened in 1864, serving the short Princes End branch line, between the Bloomfield area of Tipton and the township of Wednesbury. The station closed in 1890, only to re-open five years later. But the station closed again in 1916 as a wartime economy measure and never re-opened, though the line remained open to goods trains until 1981. The trackbed between Ocker Hill and Princes End was converted into a pedestrian walkway in 1988, in works which saw a tunnel infilled and a railway overbridge demolished.

The final stub of the line, connecting Wednesbury to Ocker Hill Power Station, remained open until February 1991. The power station itself closed five years later.

Ocker Hill has been served by a junior school since the 1850s, although the original building was replaced by the current one in the 1970s. The infant school dates from the 1930s. There was a secondary school at the site until the opening of Willingsworth High School in 1958 - this school is now known as Gospel Oak School.

A landmark water pumping station, one of the first of its kind, was opened at Ocker Hill in 1784 to re-circulate water from the nearby Walsall Canal. The Ocker Hill Tunnel Branch brought water to the pumps through a tunnel. It was then pumped up the Ocker Hill Branch of the Birmingham Canal (the Wednesbury Oak Loop). It was in use for 164 years, finally closing in 1948. However, it was not demolished until 1960, when the site was cleared for the development of Bolton Court, a development of three multi-storey tower blocks as well as two maisonette blocks. The first tenants moved there in 1964 and the complex was completed in 1965. After the demolition of the nearby cooling towers, Bolton Court became been Ocker Hill's most recognisable and distinctive landmark. The first tower block was demolished in about 1990 to be replaced by low rise housing. The two maisonette blocks were demolished in 2007. The remaining two tower blocks were demolished in 2011.

A reminder of the area's rural past survived until as recently as the 1920s. Moat Farm, situated to the west of Ocker Hill in the direction of Princes End, was built in the 17th century and stood for some 250 years until it was finally demolished to make way for the new Moat Farm council estate (nicknamed the "Lost City" as it was hemmed in by a railway, canal and acres of derelict land when first built) which was the birthplace of the former Wolverhampton Wanderers and England footballer Steve Bull in 1965. Moat Farm quickly earned its reputation as arguably Tipton's worst housing estate, but improvement took place in the 1990s which saw the existing properties modernised, while a few houses have been demolished since that time, as was the Drayton public house in about 1980, having only been built some 25 years earlier.

The famous Tipton Harriers running team has a strong connection to the Ocker Hill area of the town: the Harrier public house, opened on Powis Avenue in the 1950s, was named in the team's honour.

The Walsall Canal passes around the eastern side of Ocker Hill. Ocker Hill is referred to as "Ocker Bonk" in local dialect, the word "bonk" meaning "bank."
