= Wednesbury Town railway station =

Former railway station in the West Midlands, England

Wednesbury Town
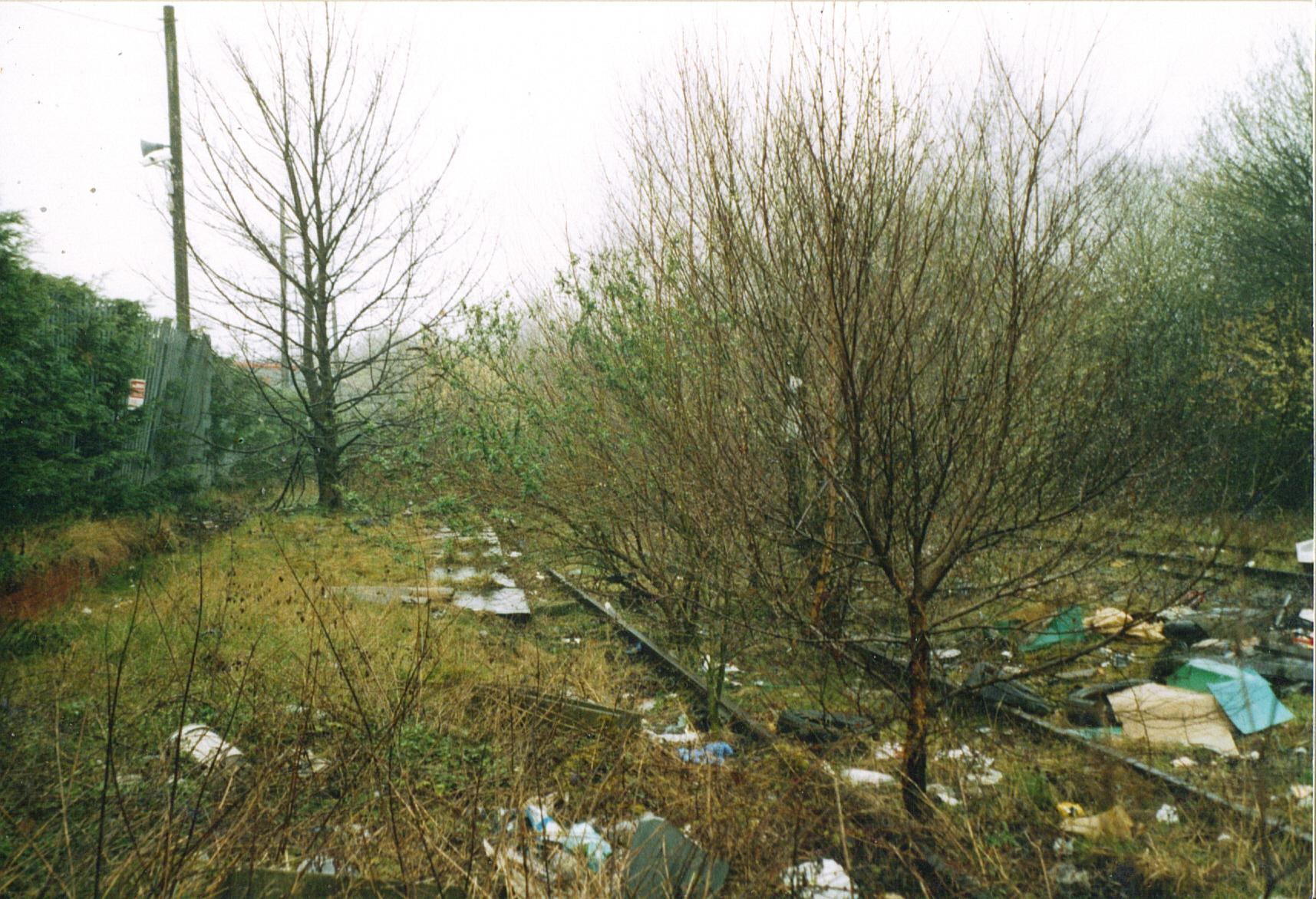
- Station site in 2003

General information
- Location: Wednesbury, Sandwell; England
- Coordinates: 52.5486°N 2.0222°W
- Grid reference: SO986945
- Platforms: 2

Other information
- Status: Disused

History
- Original company: South Staffordshire Railway
- Pre-grouping: London and North Western Railway
- Post-grouping: London, Midland and Scottish Railway

Key dates
- 1850: Opened as Wednesbury
- 1950: Renamed as Wednesbury Town
- 1964: Closed to regular passengers
- 1970: Closed to diverted trains, specials and railtours
Location

Wednesbury Town railway station served the market town of Wednesbury, in the West Midlands, England; it was a stop on the South Staffordshire Line.

== History ==
The station was opened in 1850; it was built and served by the South Staffordshire Railway, which later became London, Midland and Scottish Railway (through amalgamation of the London and North Western Railway). The line had reasonable passenger usage until about the early 1880s, when it began to slump at several stations, leading to the line becoming a largely freight only operation in 1887. It would remain open for goods traffic, which was considerable at this time, as the district had become highly industrialised in the then heyday of the Black Country's industrial past.

The station also served as the terminus of the Darlaston Loop, which ran from Walsall to Wednesbury via Darlaston and branched off on the present-day Walsall-Wolverhampton Line. It closed to passengers in the 1880s, then to freight and excursion trains in the 1960s. It is now a footpath between Darlaston and James Bridge, but is built on towards Wednesbury Town.

As the local industry declined and road transport became more common, the station entered a post-World War II decline.

The station was known as Wednesbury, until it was renamed Wednesbury Town in 1950 during nationalisation. British Rail closed the station through the Beeching Axe in 1964, due to decline in freight and passenger custom.

While the electrification of the West Coast Main Line was underway, the former Great Western Railway line did see a large increase in its traffic and a reopening of the station appear likely. Once reopened, the diverted trains were removed and the additional services quickly reduced. The last London Paddington to Birkenhead Woodside express train ran on the line in March 1967 and, after 1970, it was normally only used by goods trains.

Preceding station	Disused railways	Following station
Walsall; Line closed, station open	London and North Western Railway; South Staffordshire Railway	Great Bridge North; Line and station closed
Darlaston; Line and station closed	London and North Western Railway; South Staffordshire Railway	Great Bridge North; Line and station closed
Ocker Hill; Line and station closed	London and North Western Railway; Princes End branch line	Terminus

== The site today ==
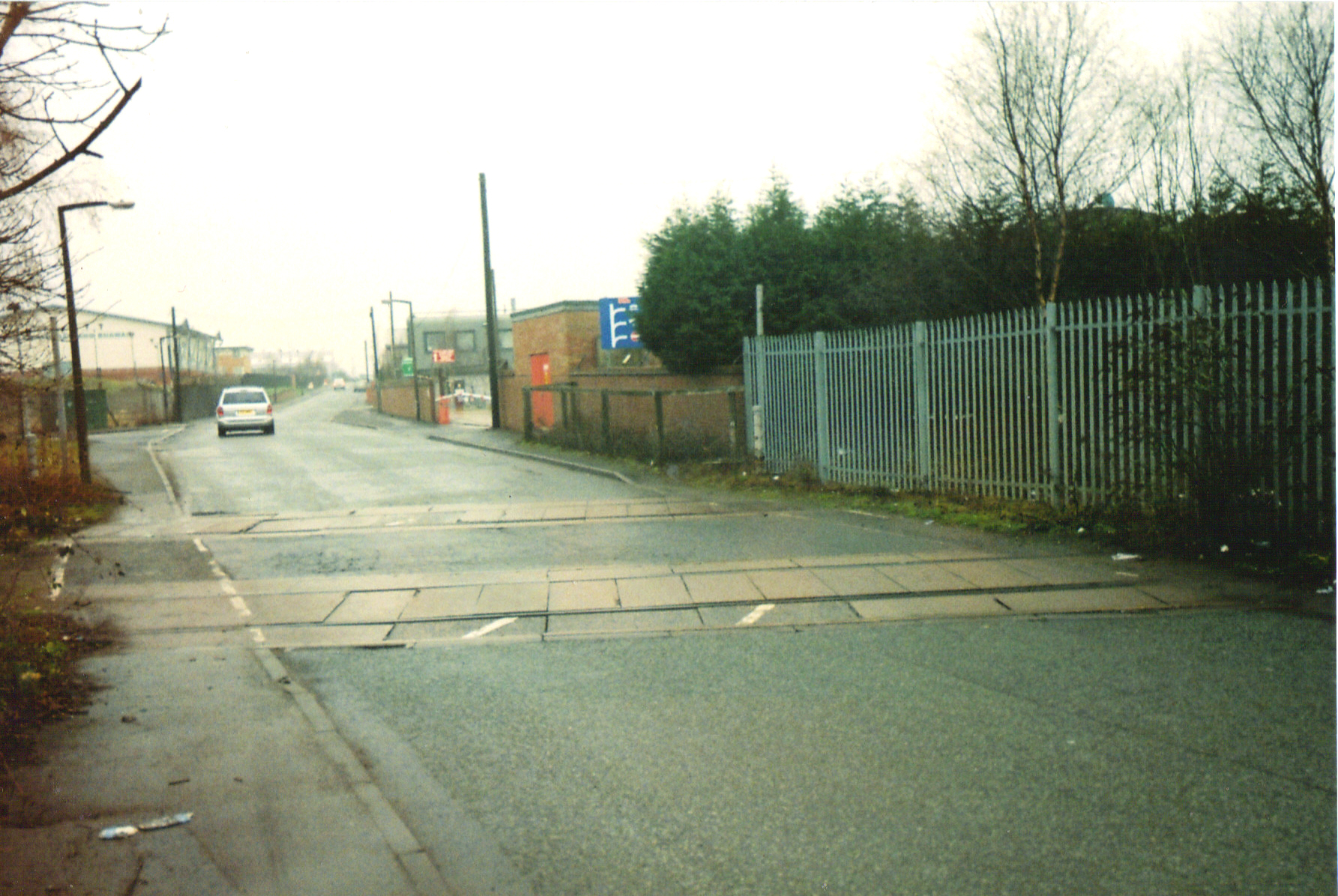
The railway crossing outside the station site in 2011

The station buildings were demolished shortly after their closure, but the platform remains intact more than 50 years later. The signal box was still in use when the Walsall-Round Oak section of the line closed in March 1993, but it was destroyed by arsonists in 1995. The level crossing was fenced off around the same time in order for the Midland Metro to be built across the line nearby, although the fence was later vandalised and the line between Wednesbury and Great Bridge is often used a route for pedestrians and dog walkers.

The station ruins were fenced off and partly built over by a growing Biffa waste disposal plant by 2010. The plant was built during the 1990s on one of the station car parks, while the buildings of several small enterprises occupy the other side.

== Midland Metro ==
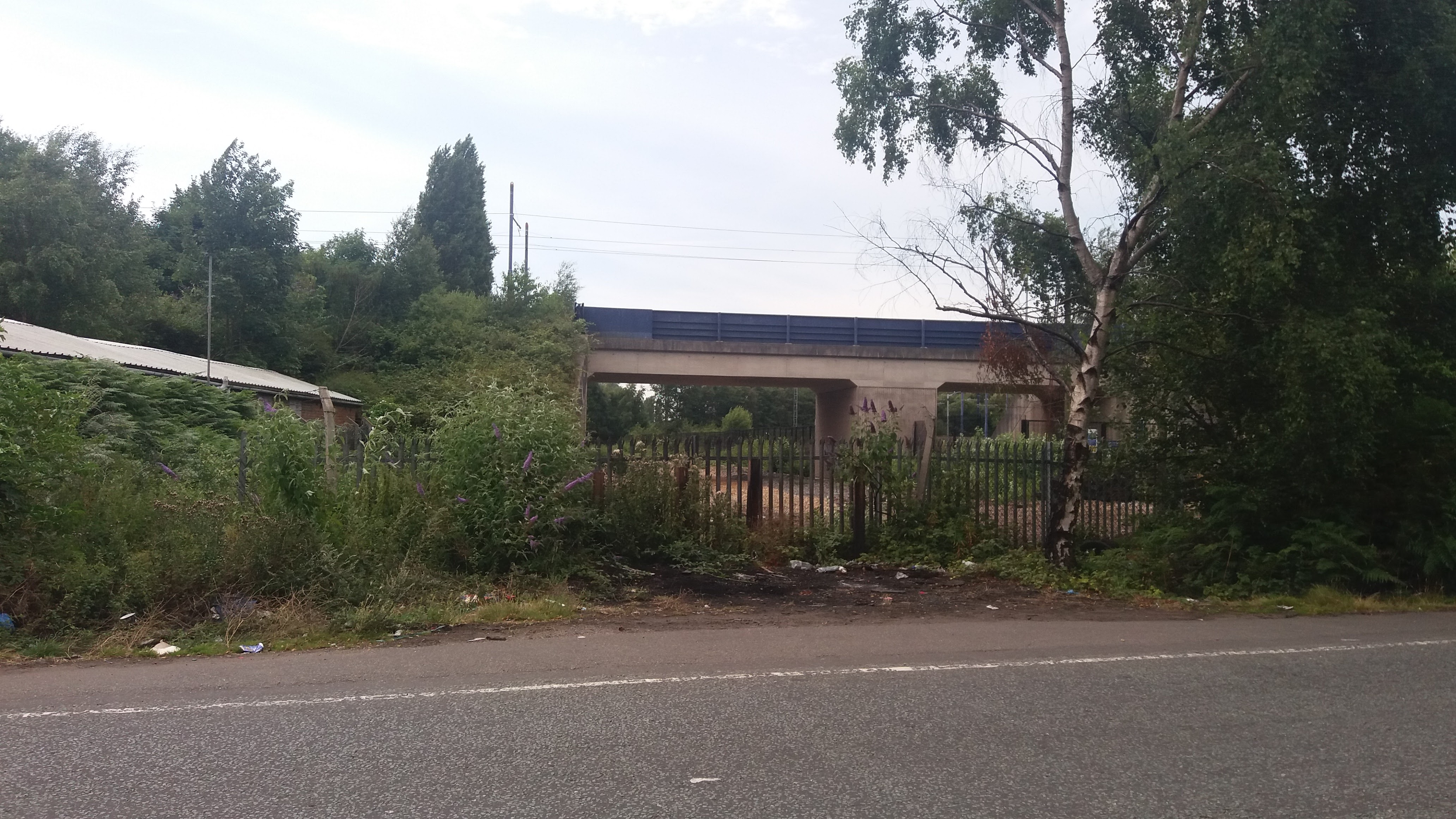
Looking across the former level crossing towards the site of the future metro extension from Wednesbury Great Western Street tram stop and freight traffic from Walsall and Round Oak

A £1.1 billion, 15-year-long regeneration project will see the station become part of the local tram network with the line reopening between Walsall, Dudley Port, Dudley and the Merry Hill Shopping Centre for trams on one track and for freight on the other. Freight trains would continue on past Brettell Lane and onto the main line at Stourbridge Junction.

In March 2011, the business plan for the reopening of the line between Stourbridge and Walsall was submitted to Network Rail. Trams would run along the South Staffordshire line through Wednesbury and Dudley, sharing the line with freight trains.

Former Mayor of the West Midlands, Andy Street, pledged to reopen the line in his campaign; however, there is still no timeline for implementation.
