= Great Bridge North railway station =

Former railway station in the West Midlands, England

Great Bridge North
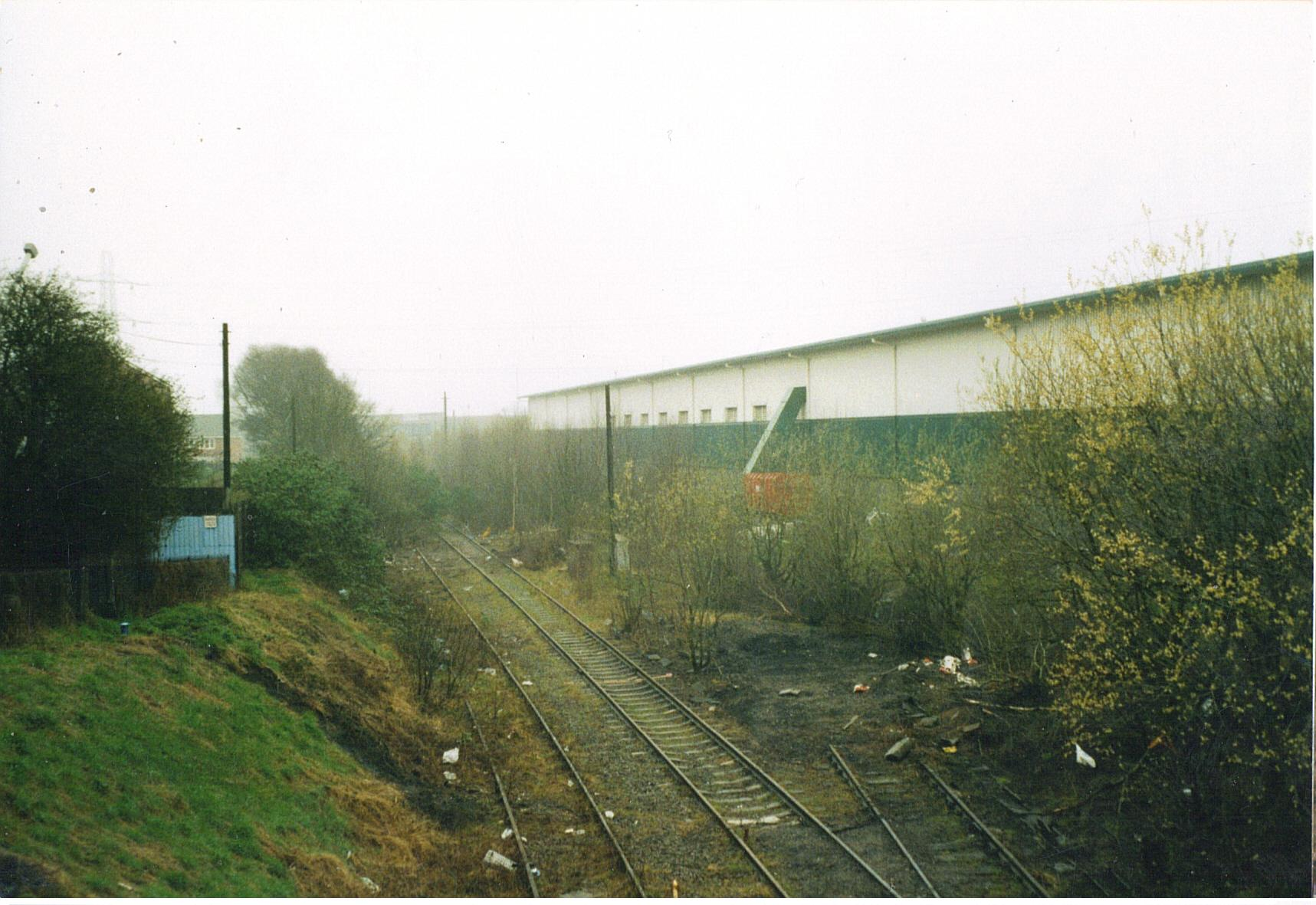
- The former station site, 2005

General information
- Location: Great Bridge, Sandwell; England
- Coordinates: 52.5331°N 2.0356°W
- Grid reference: SO976927
- Platforms: 2 (3)

Other information
- Status: Disused

History
- Original company: South Staffordshire Railway
- Pre-grouping: London and North Western Railway
- Post-grouping: London, Midland and Scottish Railway

Key dates
- 1850: Opened as Great Bridge
- 1950: Renamed Great Bridge North'
- 1964: Closed to passengers
- 1972: Closed outright
Location

Great Bridge North railway station was a stop on the South Staffordshire Line that served the suburb of Great Bridge, in the town of Tipton, West Midlands, England.

== History ==
The station was built in 1850 and was initially served by the South Staffordshire Railway. The South Staffordshire Railway was later absorbed by the London and North Western Railway, which amalgamated with several other railways in 1923 to create the London, Midland and Scottish Railway. The station shared the name Great Bridge with its Great Western Railway counterpart built in 1866; North was appended to the name of the station just after nationalisation.

Passenger usage declined in the early 1880s and the line became mainly freight in 1887. It remained open for goods traffic as the district became highly industrialised in the heyday of the Black Country's industrial past. Local industry declined after World War II, as road transport became more common.

British Rail closed the station to passengers through the Beeching Axe in 1964, but it continued as a freight station for local factories until 1972. Goods trains continued to pass through the site of the station until 1993.

Preceding station	Disused railways	Following station
Wednesbury Town	South Staffordshire Railway; Later LNWR, then LMS, finally BR; South Staffs Line (1850-1964)	Dudley Port
Walsall or Terminus	BR, then Freightliner; South Staffs Line (inc. Dudley-Stourbridge Junction to 1962) (1852-1964)	Dudley Freightliner Terminal

== The site today ==
By 1993, no sign of the station or the goods yard remained. The site is now derelict and mostly fenced off.

== Midland Metro ==
In March 2011, a plan was submitted by Dudley Council to Network Rail to reopen the South Staffordshire Line, with passenger and freight trains between Stourbridge and Walsall.

Developments in 2017 raised hopes that passenger rail services would be restored over the entire line from Stourbridge Junction to Wednesbury, albeit in two sections. Between Brierley Hill and Wednesbury, work started to clear vegetation to prepare the route for a Metro line to be constructed, subject to a grant from the Government.

In March 2019, the West Midlands Combined Authority gave the final go-ahead for the cash to finance the Wednesbury to Brierley Hill rail link.

As at March 2025, the Wednesbury to Brierley Hill extension is expected to be delivered in two phases. The first phase to Dudley town centre is expected to open for passenger services in autumn 2025. Construction for the second phase to Merry Hill, in Brierley Hill, is expected to ramp-up concurrently, with finishing works for phase one in 2025.

== Gallery ==
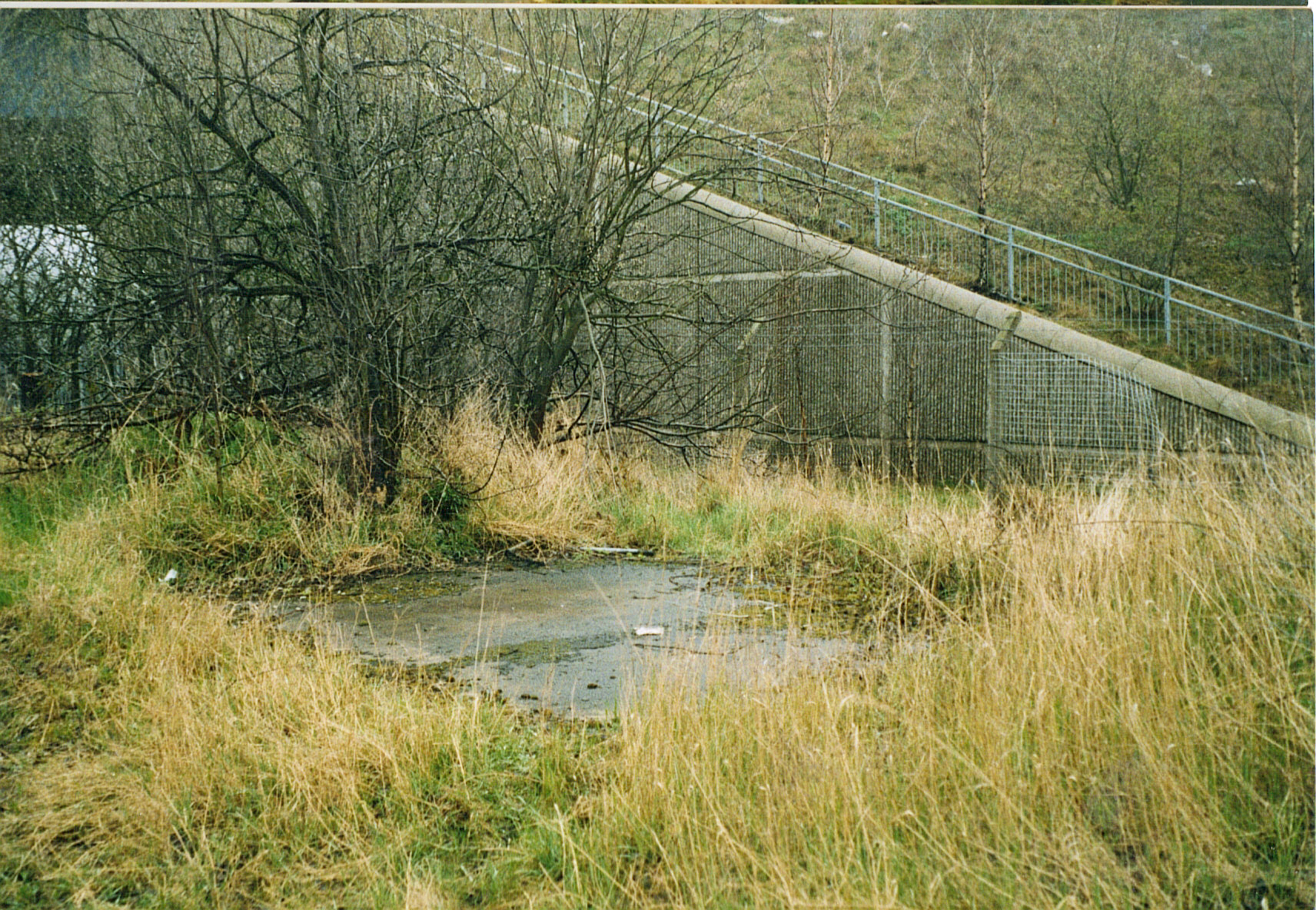
The site of the signal box, 2001.

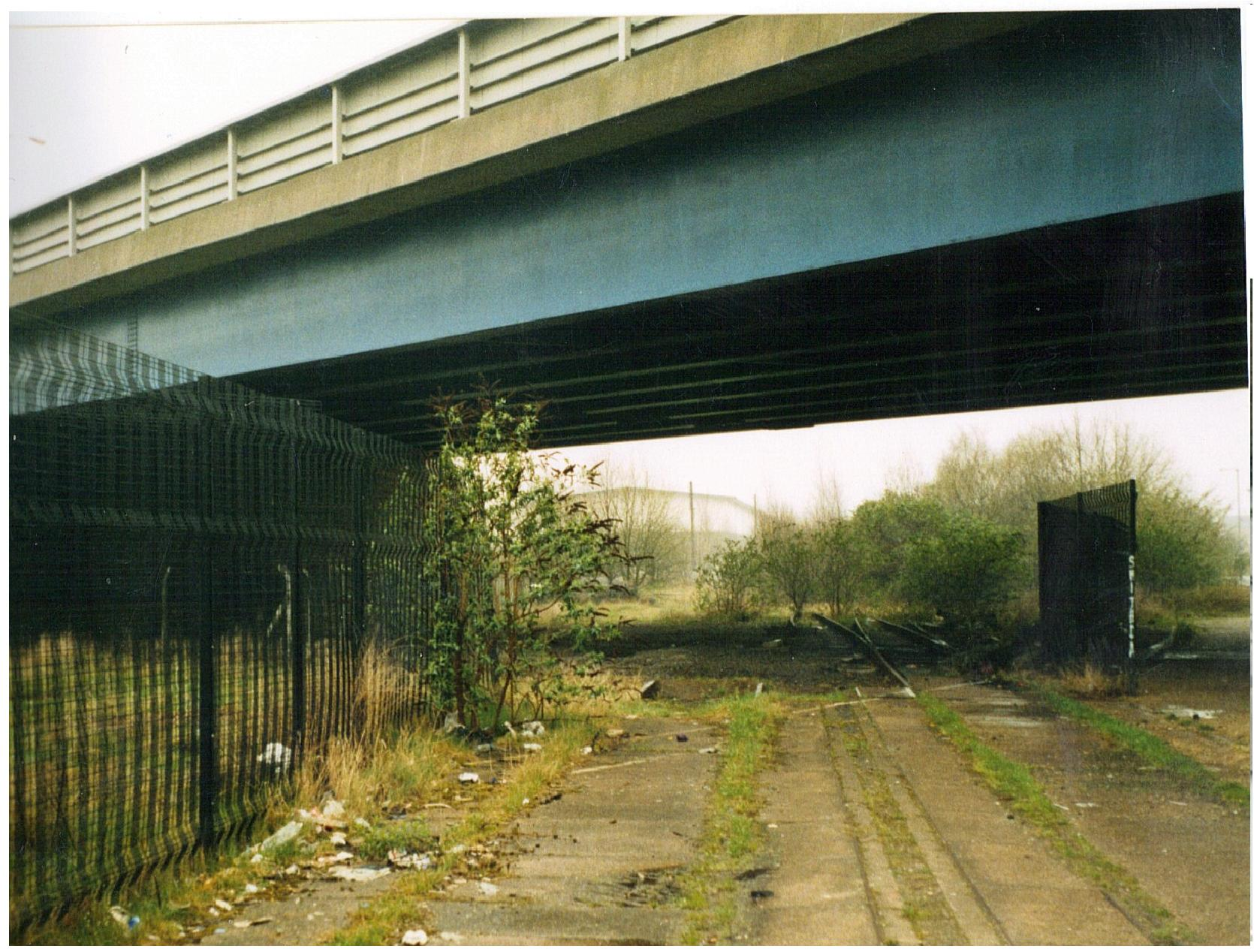
Great Bridge North station site, looking down from the crossing and past the signal box, 2003

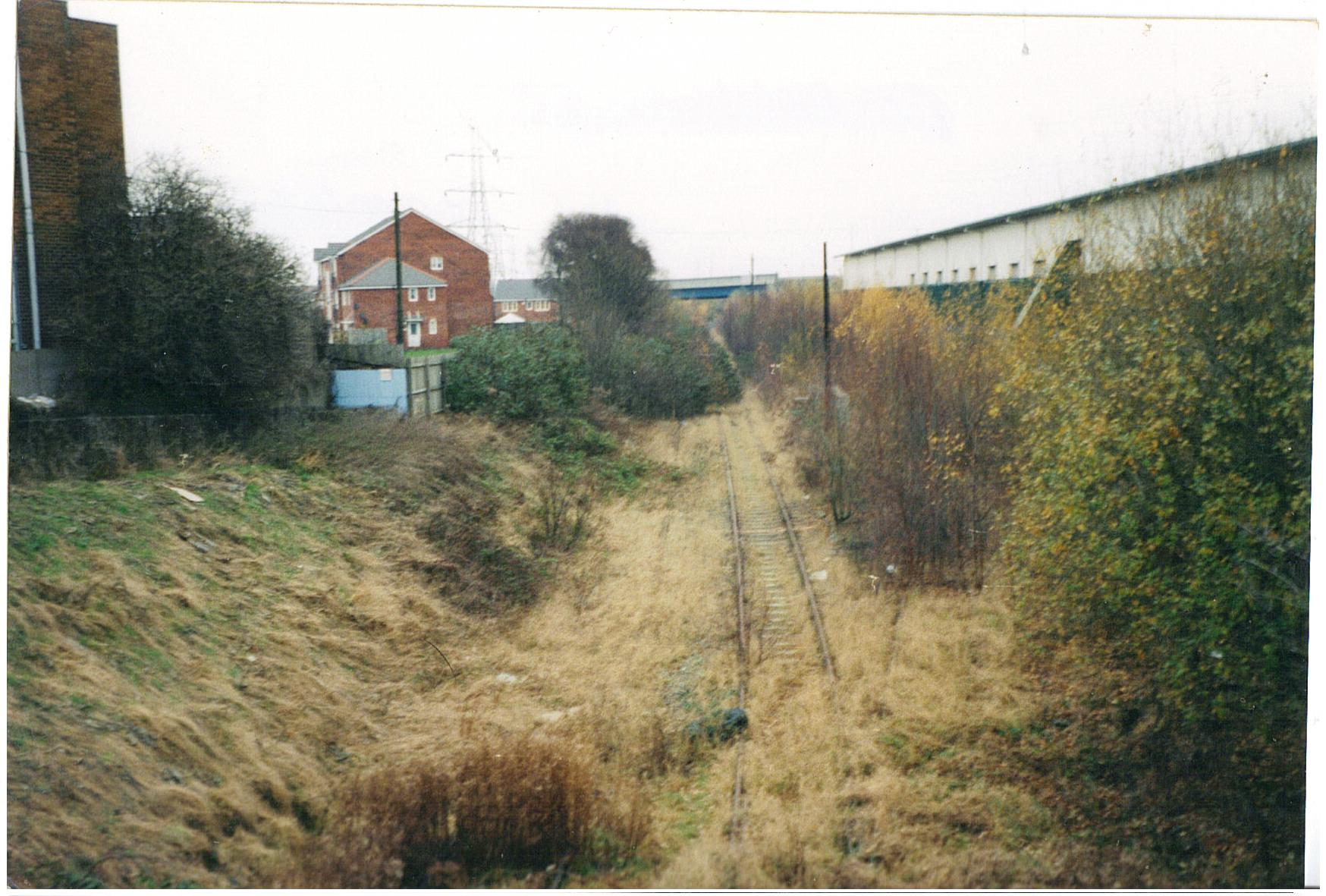
The former station site, 2003

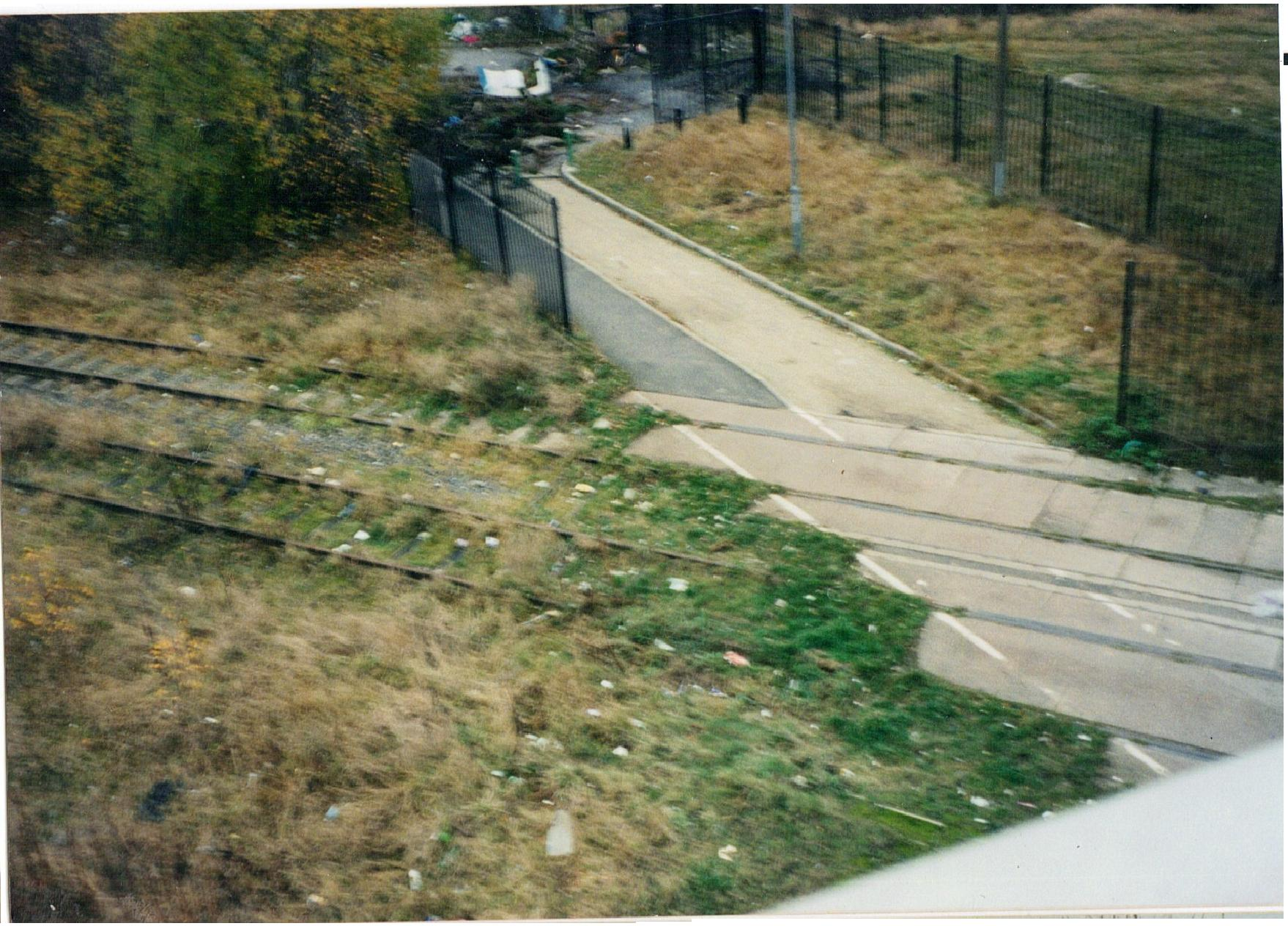
The road crossing by the signal box, 2003.

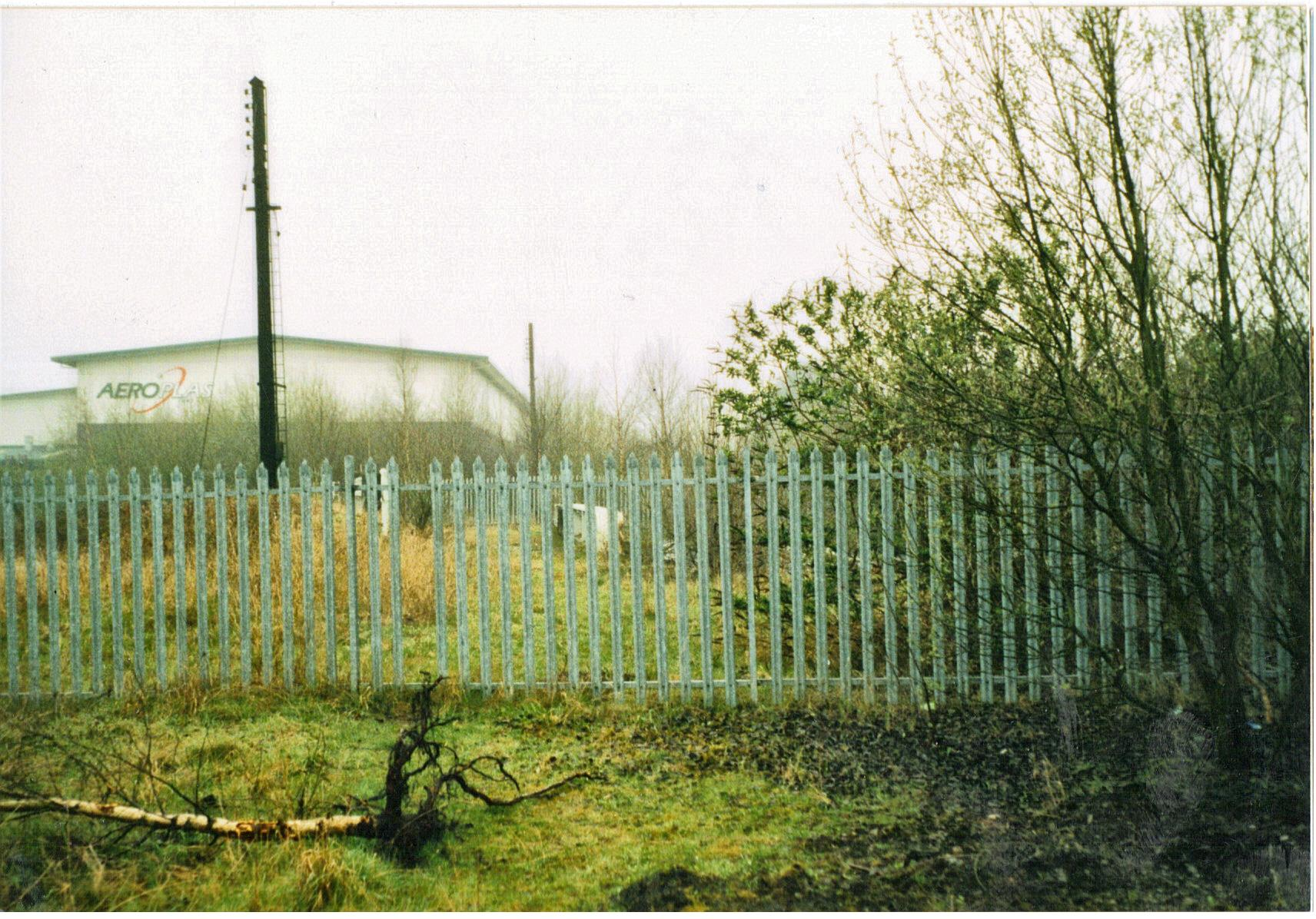
The station site, walking down from the crossing and past the signal box, towards the modern warehouse in 2003. The canal bridge is fenced off and collapsing.

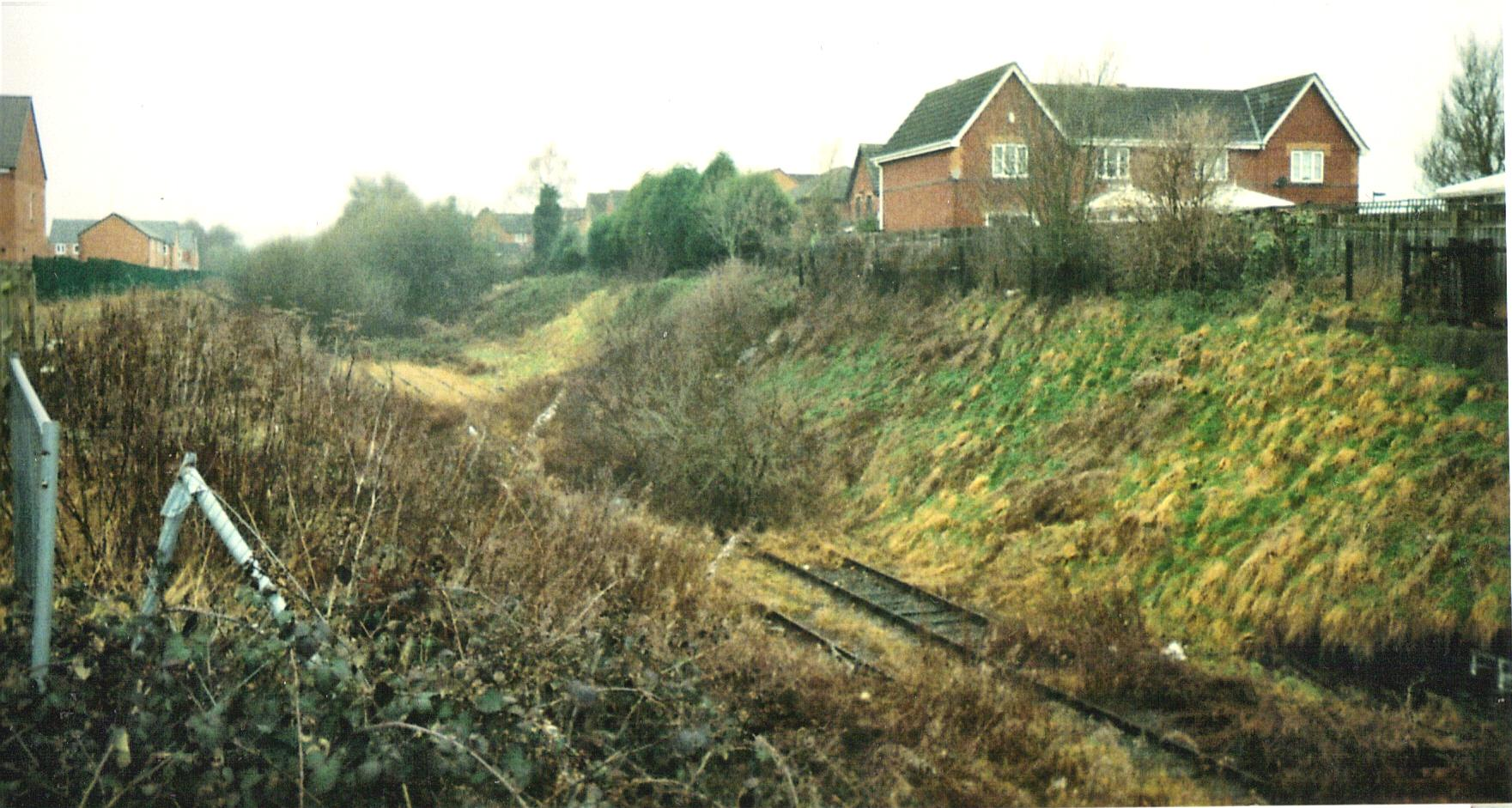
The former siding and platform entrance, 2011

== See also ==
- Round Oak Steel Terminal
- Dudley Freightliner Terminal
