= Dudley Freightliner Terminal =

Former intermodal terminal in the West Midlands, England

Coordinates: 52.517°N 2.0745°W

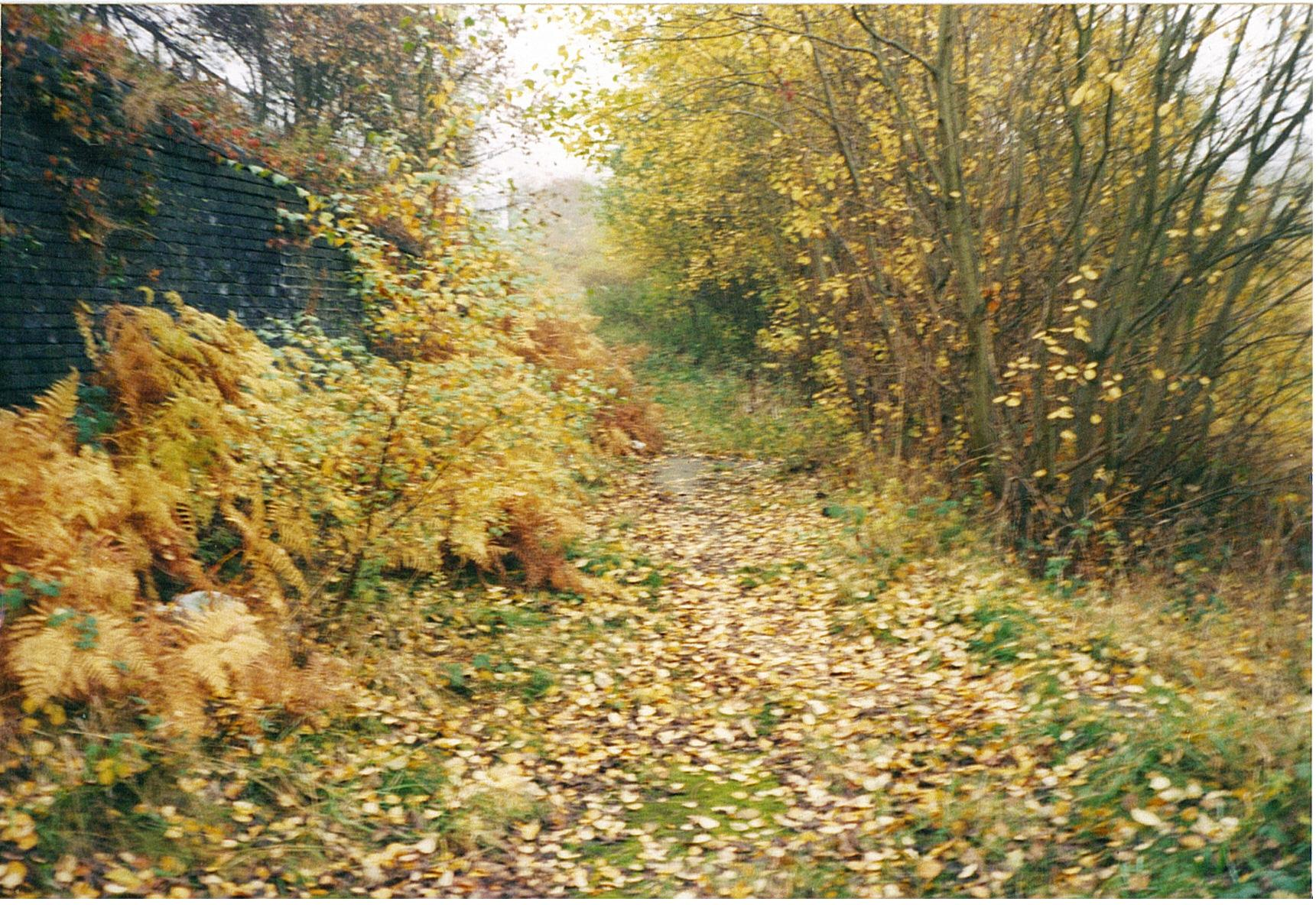
- The former Dudley signal box's remnants in 2003

General information
- Location: Dudley, Dudley Metropolitan Borough Council; England

Other information
- Status: Disused

History
- Post-grouping: British Rail, then Freightliner

Key dates
- 1967: Opened
- 1989: Closed

Dudley Freightliner Terminal was opened on the site of Dudley railway station in November 1967, as one of Freightliner's first rail terminals. It was an instant financial success and by 1981 was one of the most profitable Freightliner terminals in Britain, but Freightliner announced plans to close it and transfer the staff to the less successful Birmingham terminal. These plans were shelved in 1983 but resurfaced in 1986, with the terminal finally closing in September 1989. Trains continued to pass the site of the Freightliner terminal until the Wednesbury to Round Oak section of the South Staffordshire Line and Oxford, Worcester & Wolverhampton line closed in March 1993.

== History ==
The station platform became the depot platform, but with no buildings save for the odd shed. A concrete strip was built over one of the Tipton Five Ways lines to act as a footing for a large gantry crane that had its other footing on the old platform. The old signal box was at the Blower's Green end of the station and was demolished in 1967 and replaced by a modernized one beside the main road embankment. The sidings near the Castle side embankment were replaced by the manager's office, a staff room and some sheds.

The Freightliner equipment was removed within months of the terminal's closure, and most of the concrete surface was removed later in the 1990s. The adjacent signal box was closed on 5 June 1988 and damaged in an arson attack the following year, being dismantled in the early 1990s.

== Today's usage ==
Plans for a waste reception centre to be developed on the site were unveiled in 1997, but these were quickly shelved. There were later plans for housing and even a new football stadium to be built on the site, but none of these plans ever materialized and the site remained derelict for more than 20 years. In 2014, part of the land was developed for a road link between Dudley Zoo and the Black Country Museum, as well as parking facilities for visitors to these attractions.

== West Midlands Metro ==
A 15-year-long regeneration project will see the station become part of the local tram network with the line reopening between Walsall, Dudley Port railway station, Dudley railway station and the Merry Hill Shopping Centre for trams. Goods trains would continue on past Brettell Lane railway station and on to the mainline at Stourbridge junction, although the trams would only reach Wednesbury to the north and Brierley Hill to the south. The closed section of railway through Dudley is expected to re-open by 2025, as a combined West Midlands Metro tram route, and the capacity for heavy rail line at a later date.

When the Midland Metro opens, the route will involve trams leaving the traditional line near the former terminal site and passing through Dudley town centre before rejoining the line at the southern mouth of the Dudley Railway Tunnel.

Part of the terminal site is already occupied by a new car park serving Dudley Zoo. The site was cleared of vegetation and the old track in 2017, along with other locations along the disused line, with full scale work beginning towards the end of 2019. Several bridges along the route are being completely rebuilt, while Parkhead Viaduct is undergoing renovation rather than reconstruction due to its listed status.

== Historic imagery of the site ==
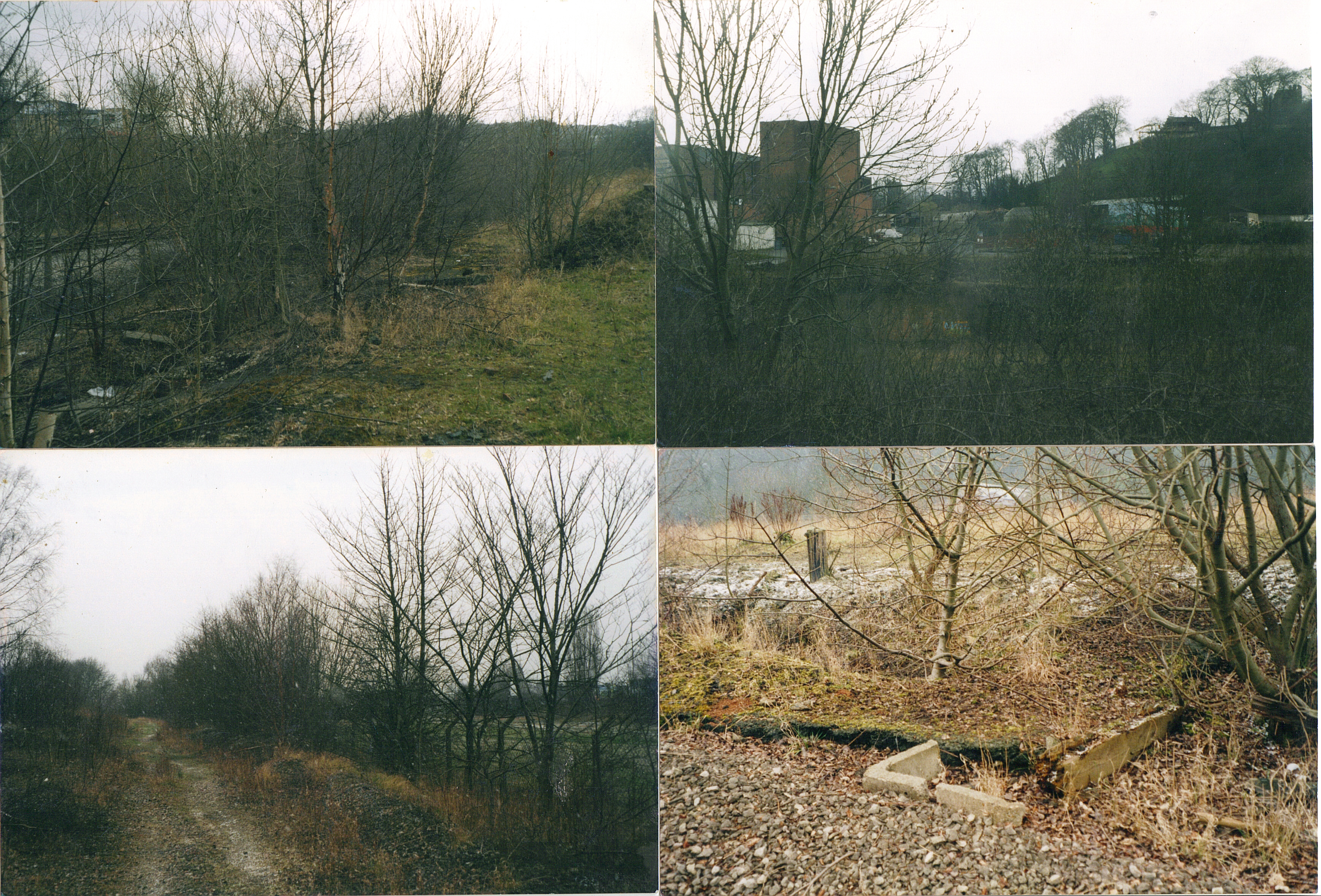
The depot in 2001

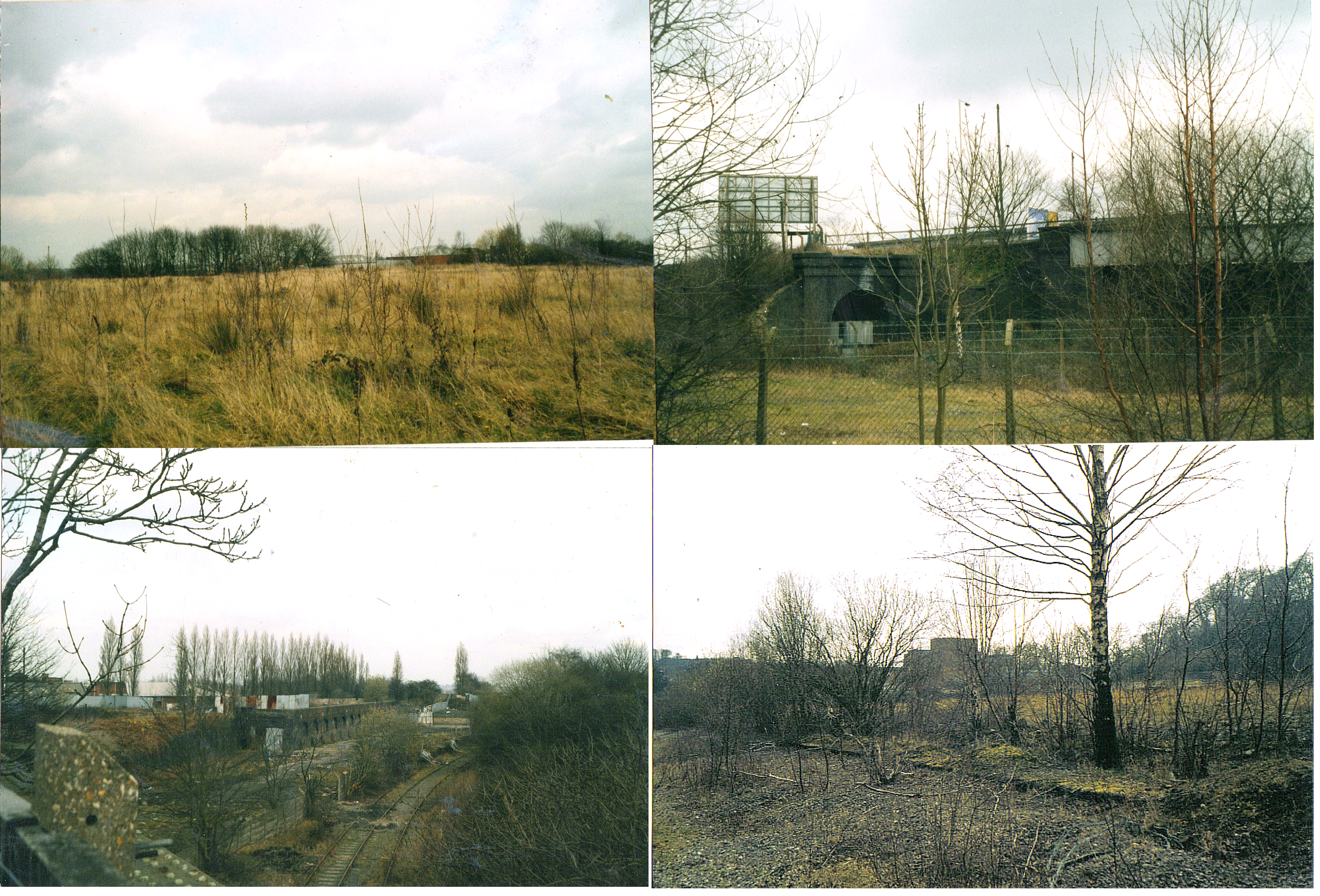
The depot in 2001

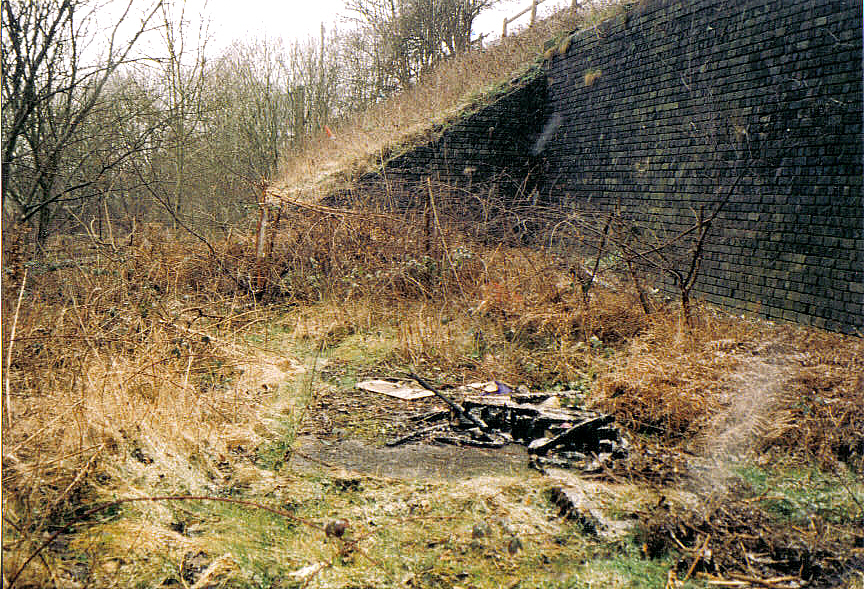
The former Dudley Freightliner Terminal signal box's remnants in 2002.

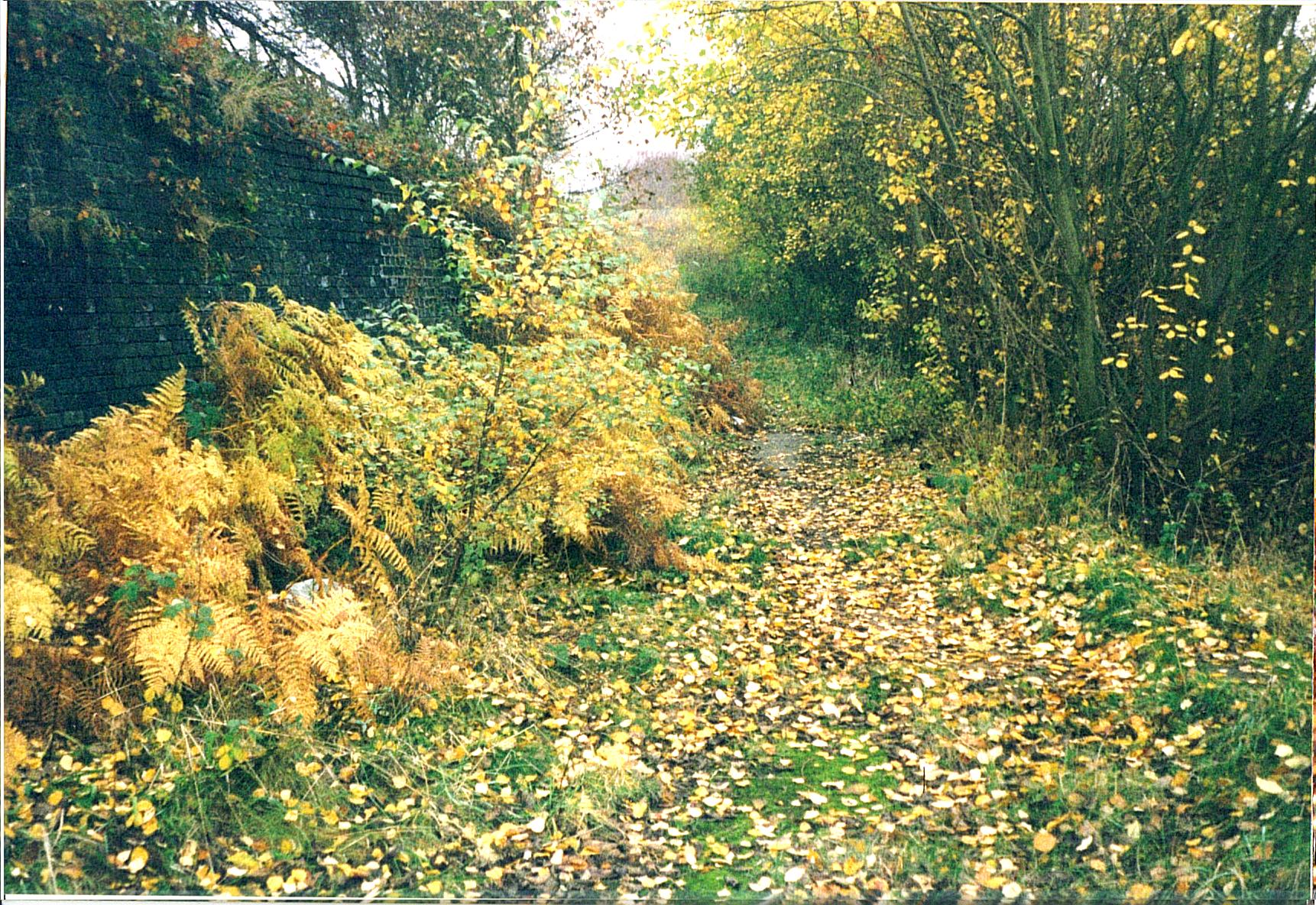
The former Dudley Freightliner Terminal signal box's remnants in 2002, more than 10 years after it was closed and destroyed by arsonists.

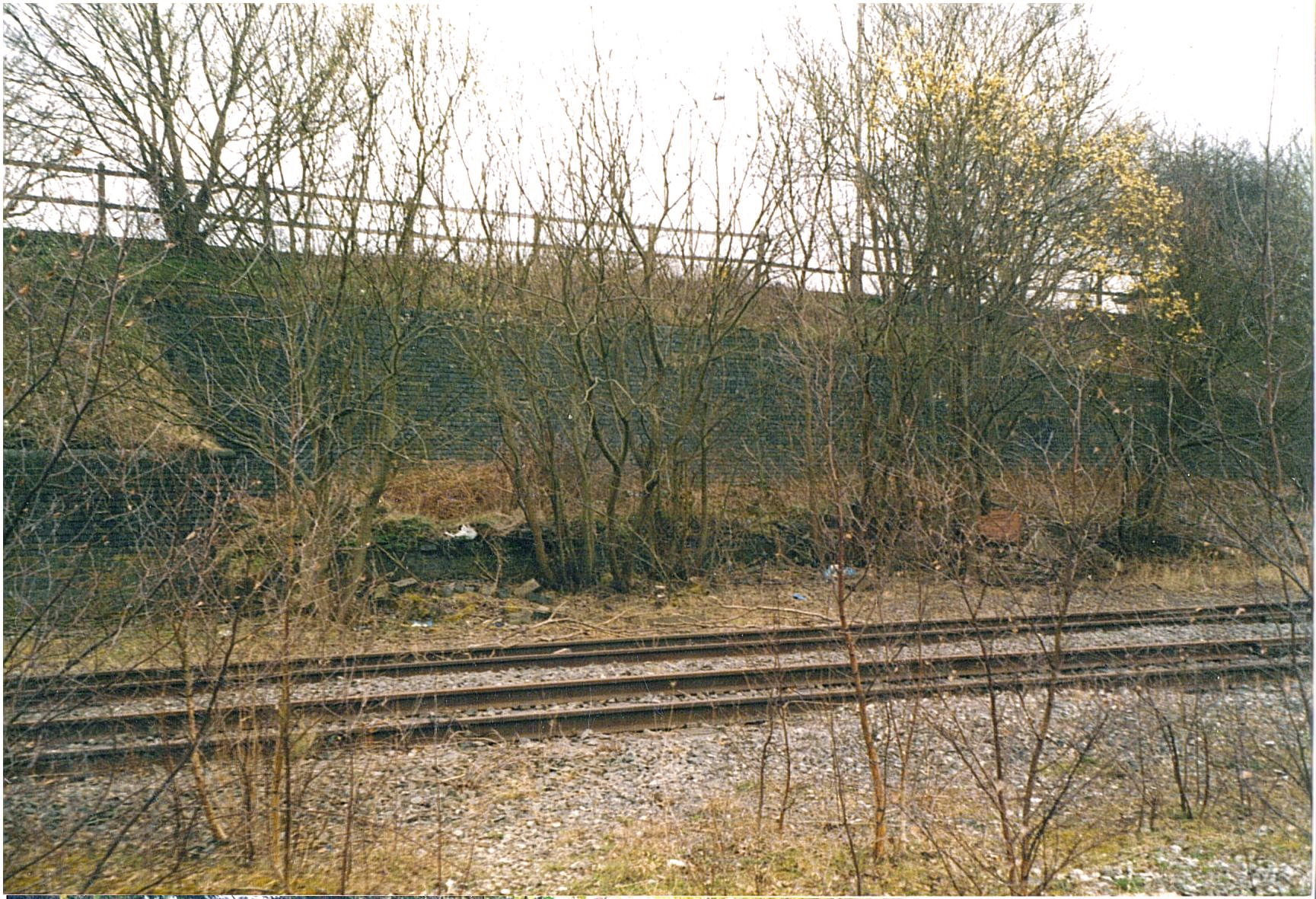
The former Dudley Freightliner Terminal signal box's remnants in 2002.

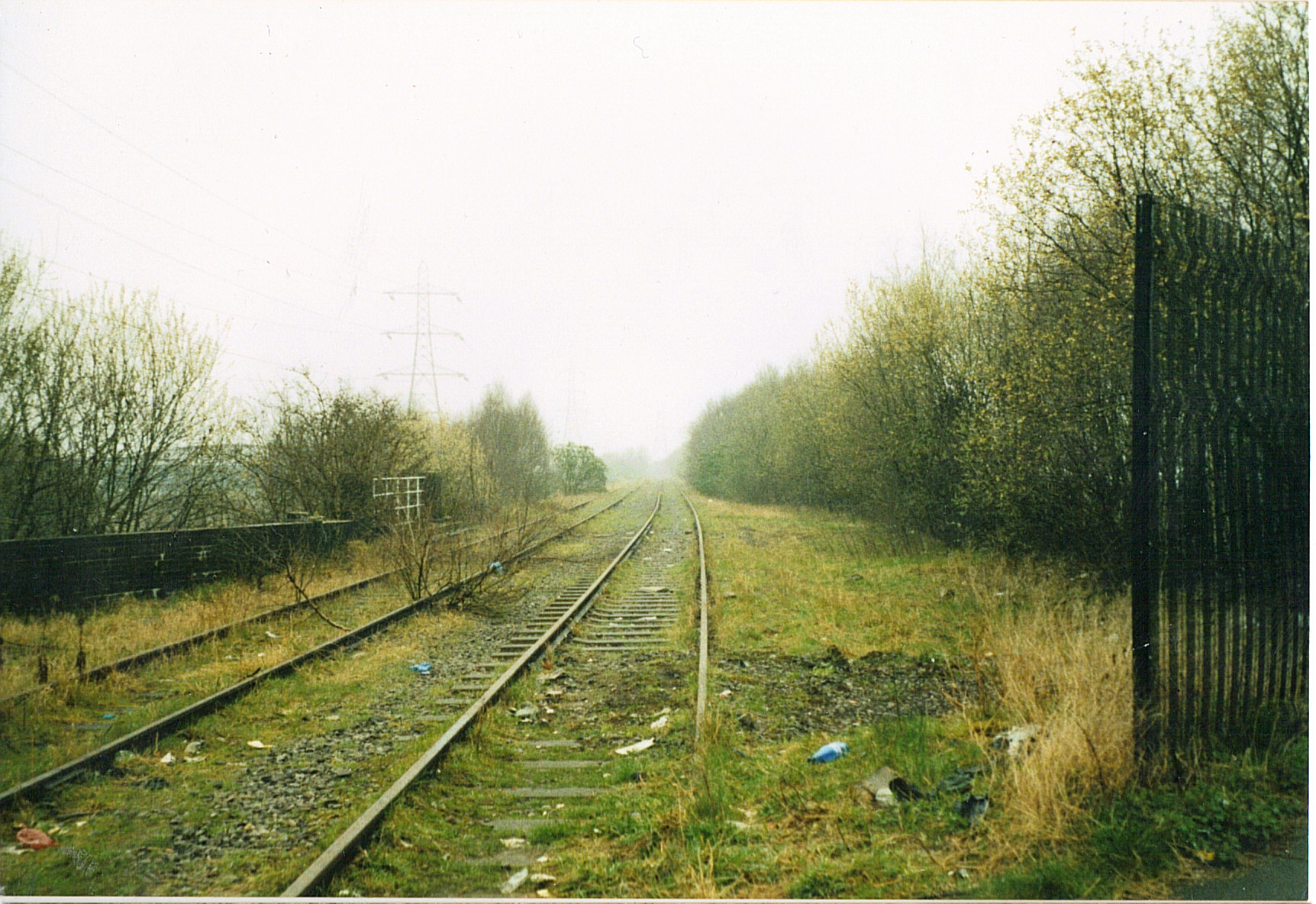
The closed old railway lines that once ran between Dudley port and Dudley's Freightliner depot in 2001.

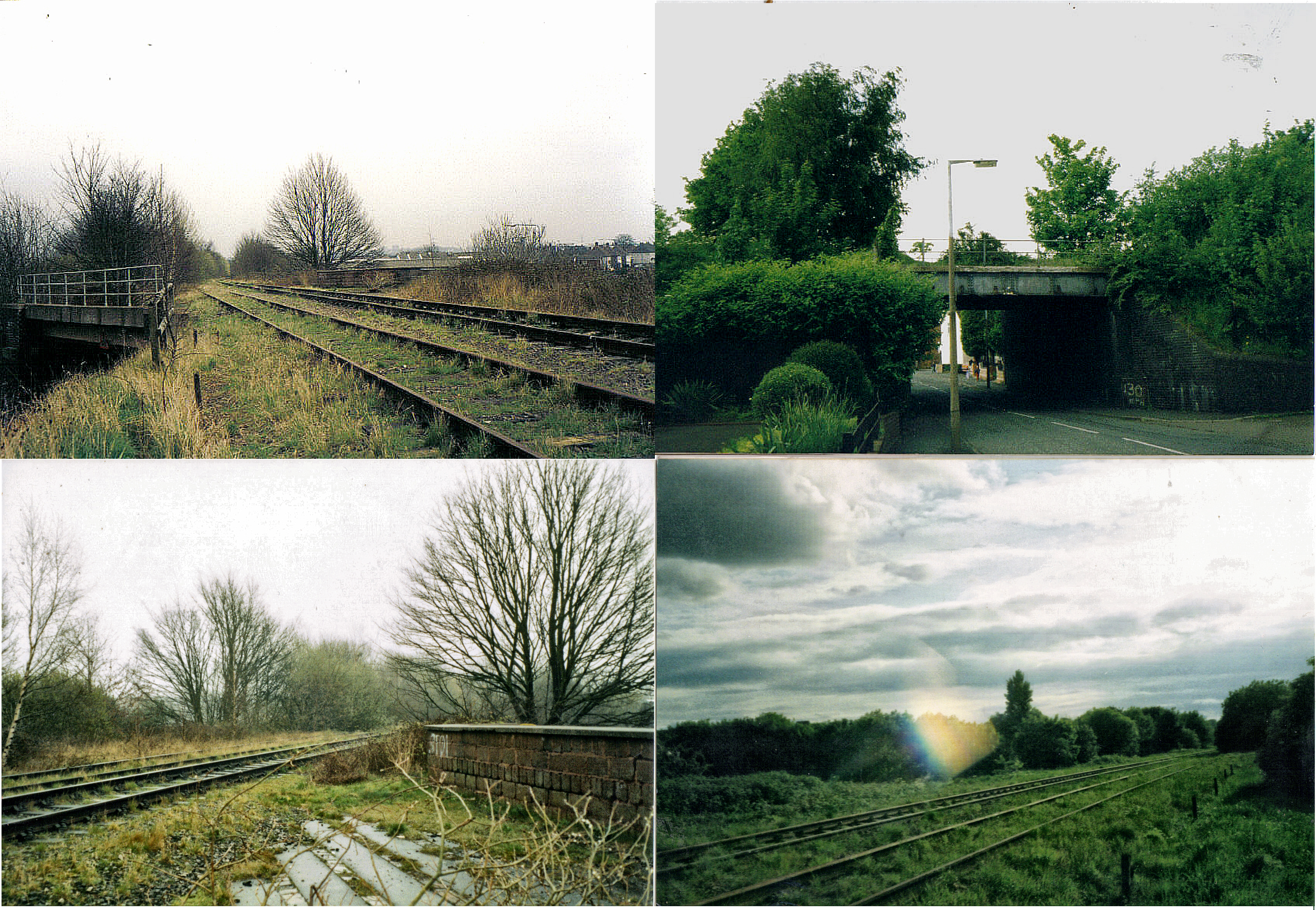
The closed old railway lines that once ran between Dudley port and Dudley's Freightliner depot in 2001.

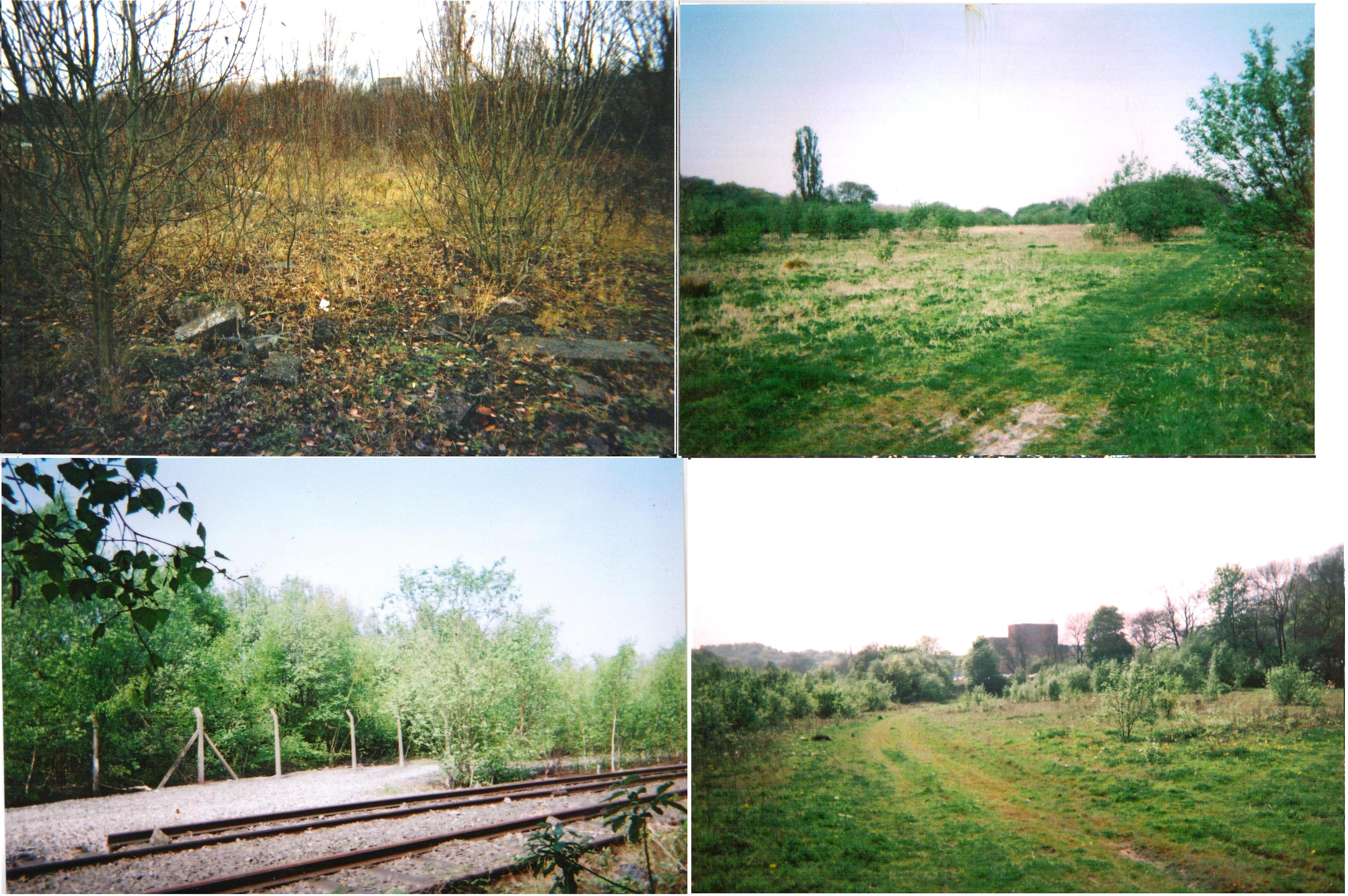
Clockewise- 1/ The former Dudley station signal box. 2/ The end of the former station-come-depot goods yard. It was a rubbley field from 2000 to date (2011). 3/ The former sidings by the castle. 4/ A view from the base of the Freightliner signal box across to the former station come depot. The tracks are the line from Dudley Port to Netherton, but the path is trackbed of the line to Tipton Five-ways.

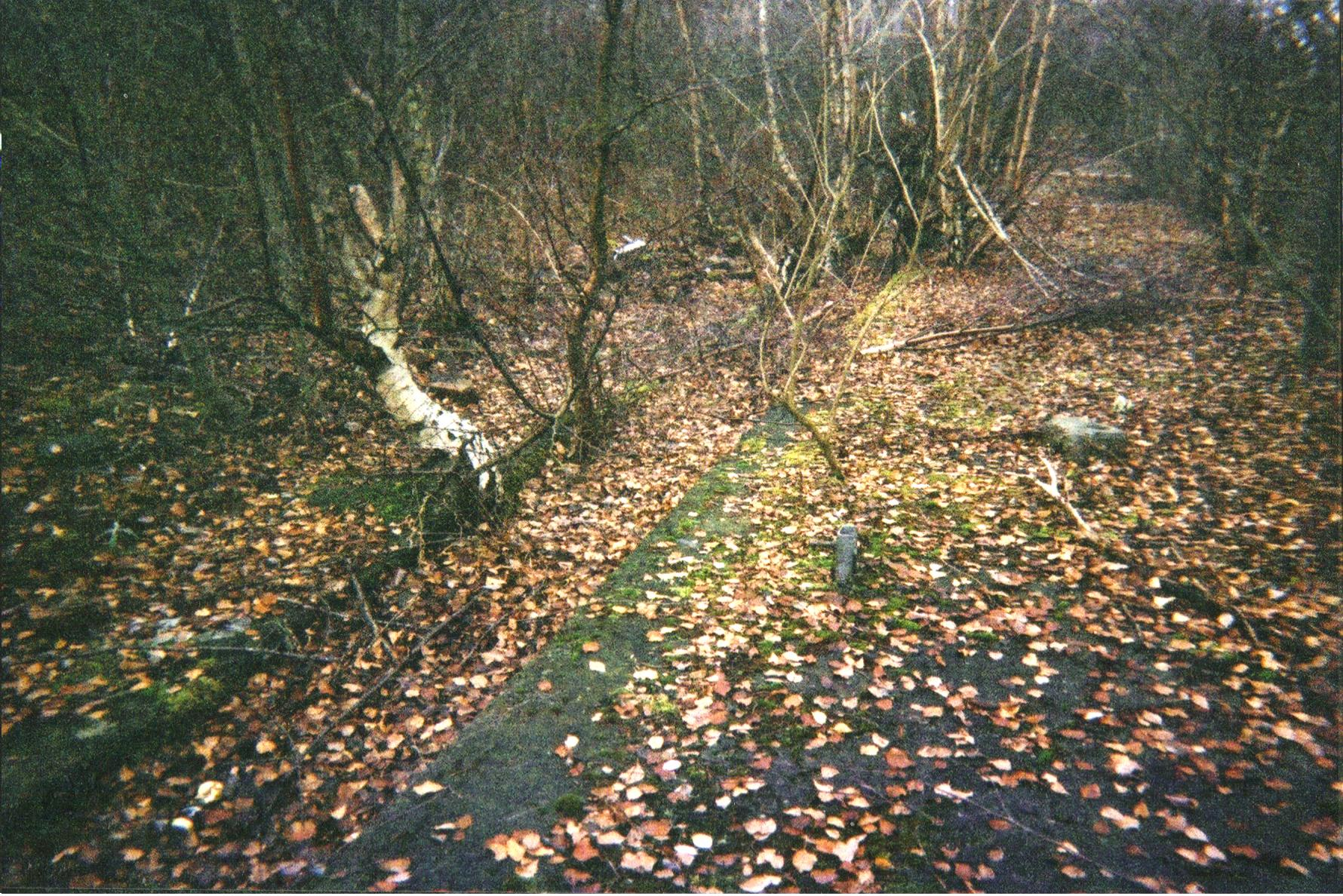
Dudley Town's former station platform in 2011 with an old channel carved in it. The channel is for a former gantry crane at the Freightliner depot that Later covered the station platforms and goods yard.

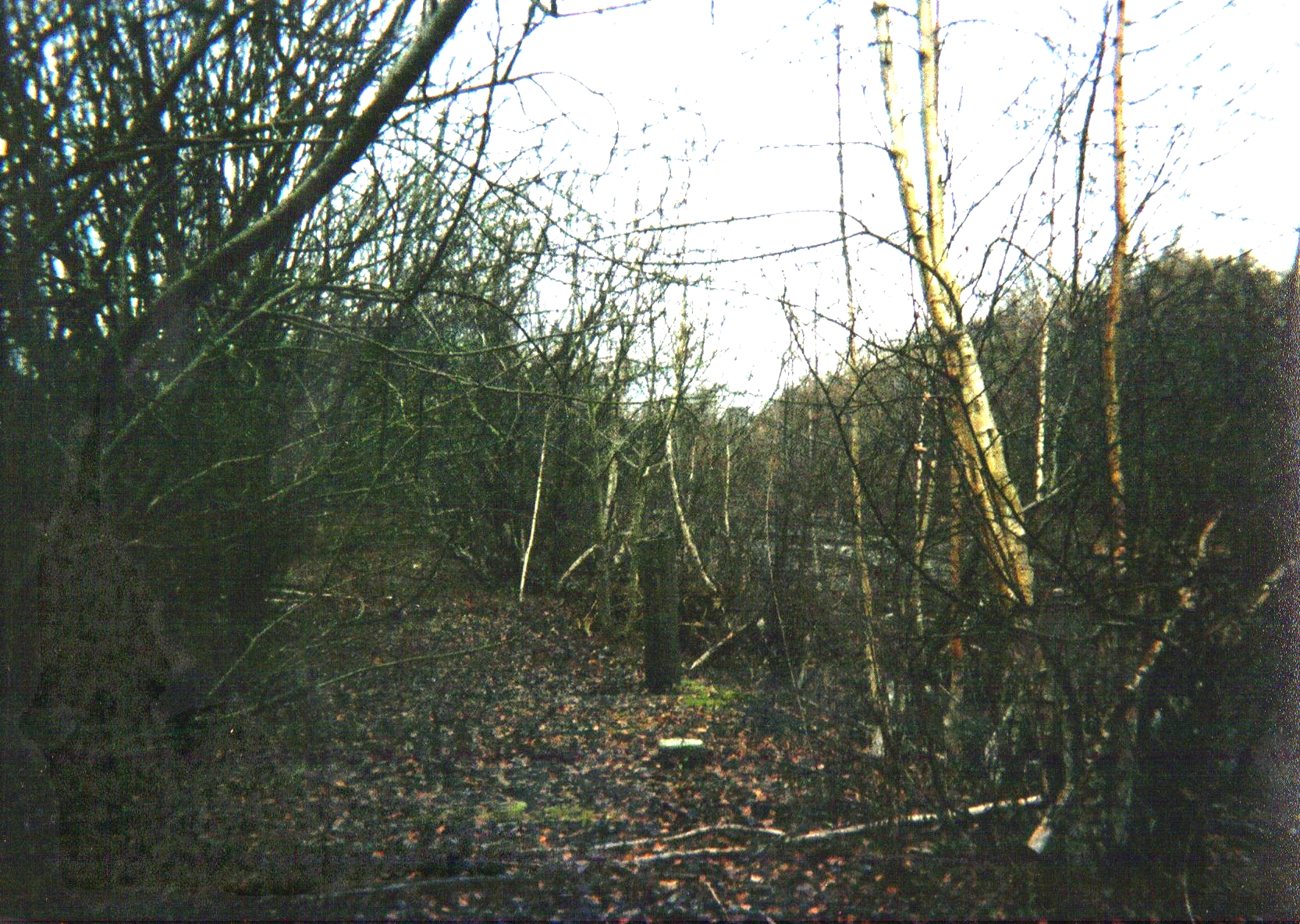
Dudley Town's former station platform in 2011. There is a channel (out of shot) in it for a former gantry crane at the Freightliner depot that later covered the station platforms and goods yard.

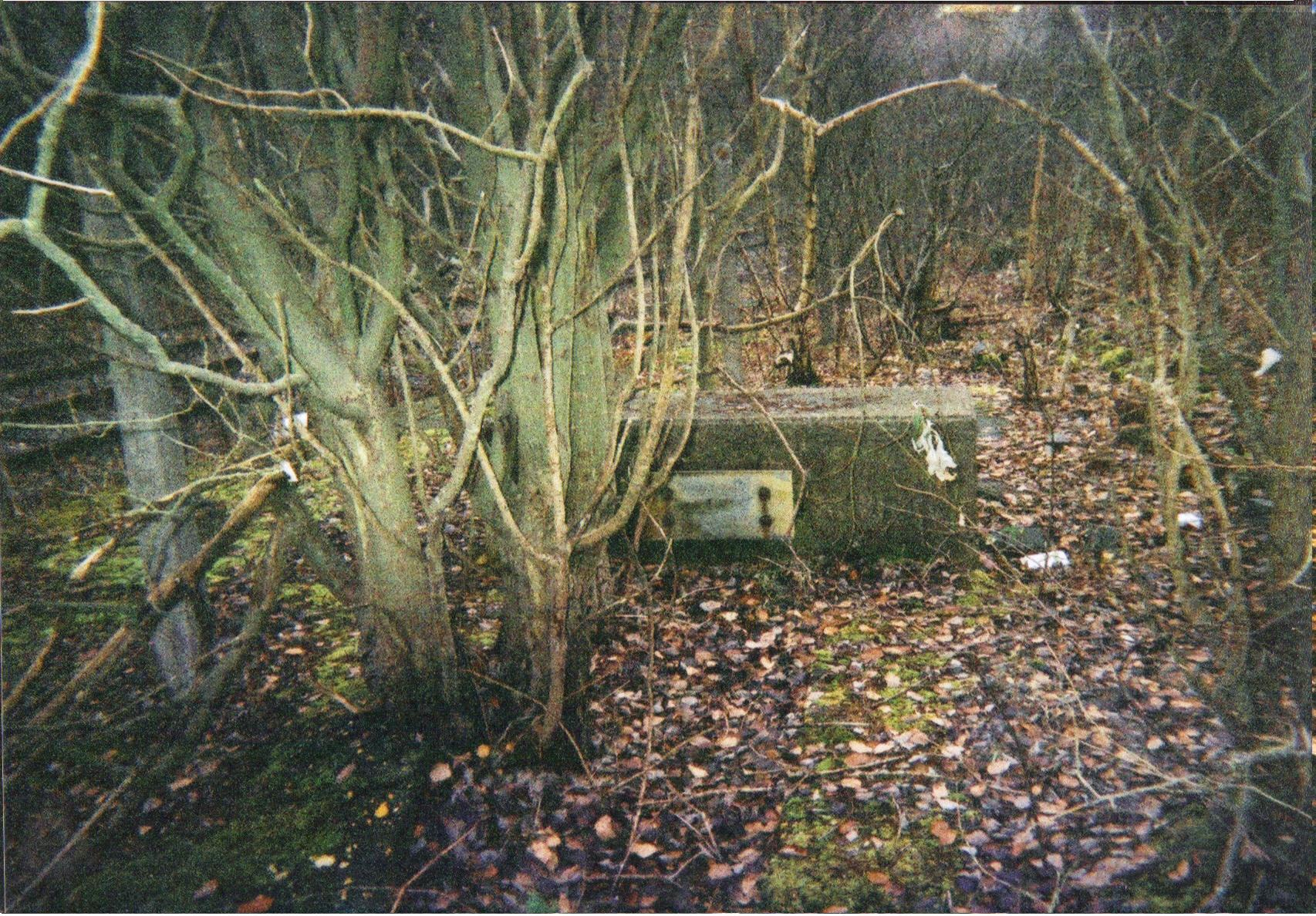
Dudley Town's former station platform in 2011 with buffers and an old channel carved in it. The channel and buffer beams were for a former gantry crane at the Freightliner depot that Later covered the station platforms and goods yard.

Preceding station	Disused railways	Following station
Great Bridge North railway station or Terminus	British Rail, then Freightliner; South Staffs Line (inc. Dudley-Stourbridge Junction to 1962) (1852-1964)	Stourbridge Junction railway station or Terminus

== See also ==
- Round Oak Steel Terminal
- Great Bridge North railway station
- Wren's Nest quarry
