= Ocker Hill Power Station =

Former power station in England

- Country: England
- Location: Tipton
- Coordinates: 52.54°N 2.03°W
- Status: Decommissioned
- Construction began: 1901
- Commission date: 1902
- Decommission date: 1977
- Owners: Midland Electric Corporation (1902–1927); West Midlands Joint Electricity Authority (WMJEA) (1927–1948); British Electricity Authority (1948–1955); Central Electricity Authority (1955–1957); Central Electricity Generating Board (1958–1977)
- Operator: As owner
- Cooling towers: 3
- Cooling source: Recirculating water

Power generation
- Units operational: 2 × 34 MW + 2 × 30 MW (steam); 4 × 70 MW (gas turbines)
- Units decommissioned: All
- Nameplate capacity: 280 MW (gas turbine)

Ocker Hill Power Station was situated at Ocker Hill in Tipton, Staffordshire, at a point where the Walsall Canal intersected the L&NWR Wednesbury to Princes End railway line. It was opened in 1902 by the Midland Electric Corporation for Power Distribution (MEC) and supplied electricity at 7 kV two phase 50 Hz to much of the Black Country. At the time of its building it was stated by the Stourbridge County Express that it was planned to be the largest power station in England. Although this may have been the original intention, it was never achieved.

== History ==
The original plant comprised two Ferranti 800 kW reciprocating steam alternators and a 1500 kW Ferranti/Yates and Thom machine. Steam was provide from eight Babcock and Wilcox boilers each has an evaporative capacity of 12,000lb/hr. Because of the rapid advance in the design of steam turbines, no more reciprocating machines were installed, and by 1906 a Willans/Dick Kerr steam turbine had been installed to meet the growing load, the first of fifteen turbines to be installed during the life of the station.

By 1923 the plant comprised 1 × 800 kW and 1 × 1,500 kW reciprocating engines and generators, and 3 × 1,500 kW, 3 × 3,000 kW and 2 × 5,000 kW turbo-alternators, these were supplied from the boiler plant which produced a total of 492,000 lb/hr (62.0 kg/s) of steam. Electricity was generated at 7000 volts, 2-phase, 50 Hz AC, with distribution at 7000, 2700, and 200 volts. In 1923 the station generated 38.858 GWh of electricity, some of this was used in the plant, the total amount sold was 33.482 GWh. The revenue from sales of current was £271,812, this gave a surplus of revenue over expenses of £139,070. In 1928 a new 10,000 kW English Electric turbo alternator set was commissioned.

19 MW of plant was removed from service during 1952/53.

== Joint Electricity Authority ==
In 1927, ownership passed to the new West Midlands Joint Electricity Authority (WMJEA), and with the building of the National Grid in the early 1930s it became a "selected station". In 1948 it became part of the newly created British Electricity Authority (later to become, by reorganisation the Central Electricity Authority (CEA) and then the Central Electricity Generating Board (CEGB). It closed in 1977, as a result of the mid-1970s recession, which also claimed many other serviceable stations.

In 1951, the station achieved brief fame in the technical world by being the first to run a large alternator, whose turbine was disabled, as a so-called "synchronous condenser", which enabled the generation of lagging reactive current in order to boost voltage at a weak point in the system. As it was deprived of its driving turbine, the alternator was run up to speed by using its rotor damping winding as a squirrel cage, the stator being fed from another turbo running at reduced speed and voltage. When the rotor had come up to speed, excitation was applied to achieve synchronism.

Originally equipped with reciprocating steam engines, during its long life a total of eighteen generating sets were installed and in turn replaced with larger units or scrapped. The final equipment was of fairly typical 1940's design with eight Babcock stoker-fired boilers using the range system, feeding two British Thomson-Houston 34 MW sets and two Richardsons-Westgarth 30 MW sets, running at 650 psi and 875 °F (468 °C) superheat. Two of the cooling towers were unique, nationally and probably globally, in having the control room, 33 kV switchgear, relay room, garages and main stores beneath them. The station was coal-fired throughout its life, although small quantities of more unusual low-cost fuels were burned, including coke, sawdust, and at one period chicken droppings. Fuel was delivered originally by canal and later by rail, with small quantities by road. Although in later years the station was small in comparison with modern stations, it was extremely successful, and had a high availability, load factor and thermal efficiency when compared with most stations similar in design and age. It was the first station in the country to use the innovative "Taprogge" system of on-load condenser tube cleaning. For thirteen years, from 1959 to 1971, the load factor never dropped below 50%, well above that of the system as a whole. In 1968-1970, Ocker Hill had the highest load factor of any CEGB stoker-fired station, and the third highest thermal efficiency. During periods of plant shortage, it repeatedly carried overloads of up to 20%.

== Operations ==
The electricity generating capacity and output of the power station are shown in the table.

Ocker Hill electricity capacity and output
Year	1946	1947	1948	1950	1954	1955	1956	1957	1958	1961	1962	1963	1967	1971	1981	1982
Installed capacity, MW		41.7	79	69	56	56	56	112	112	128	128	128	128	128	280	280
Electricity output, GWh	22.88	31.3	184.2	262.6	125.548	250.304	211.731	285.643	277.433	454.5	467.6	472.4	628.58	401.396	5.606	20.076
Thermal efficiency, %		12.73	119.72	20.97	23.72	23.86	23.68	23.61	28.87	23.81	23.35	23.39	24.02	22.59	16.98	23.19

Electricity output in GWh

=== Gas turbine plant ===
In the 1970s a gas turbine plant was installed at Ocker Hill. This comprised four GEC Gas Turbine Quad Olympus 70 MW gas turbines with a capability to deliver 280 MW of electricity. In the year ending 31 March 1981, the plant delivered 5.61 GWh of electricity, just 0.2 per cent of its capability. The gas turbines were intended only for peak-lopping and emergency use, hence the low load factor. Units 6 & 7 were decommissioned in 1996 and units 5 & 8 in 1999.

=== Demolition ===
The buildings and cooling towers remained unused on site for a number of years. The buildings were dismantled and the towers were demolished in controlled explosions, No. 3 on 18 August 1985 and Nos. 1 and 2 on 15 September. The site is now a housing estate, built in the mid-1990s, and the Black Country Spine Road runs through the former site of the coal plant. A small industrial estate was built on part of the site in the 1990s, including a road which follows the route of the former Princes End Branch railway line, which closed as a through route in 1981 (although the passenger stations along the route had been closed in 1916 due to wartime economy measures). The final stub linking the gas turbine power station to the South Staffordshire Line remained open until 1991, two years before the South Staffordshire Line itself closed.
