= Gospel Oak School =

Location
- Bilston Road; Gospel Oak; Tipton, West Midlands, DY4 0BZ; England
- Coordinates: 52°33′00″N 2°02′50″W

Information
- Type: Academy
- Motto: Transforming Learning, Transforming Lives.
- Opened: 1958 (Willingsworth) 2008 (RSA Academy) 2021 (Gospel Oak School)
- Local authority: Sandwell
- Department for Education URN: 135599 Tables
- Ofsted: Reports
- Principal: Ross Trafford
- Gender: Co-educational
- Age: 11 to 19
- Enrolment: 1,195
- Colours: Black and Red
- Website: www.gospeloakschool.co.uk

Gospel Oak School (formerly The Royal Society of Arts (RSA) Academy and Willingsworth High School) is one of the new academies opened in England.

The school's history dates back to September 1958, when Willingsworth Secondary Modern School to serve the Ocker Hill and Princes End areas of Tipton, replacing a smaller secondary modern at Ocker Hill and gaining comprehensive status in September 1969, when it became Willingsworth High.

It became the RSA Academy in September 2008 and moved into its current buildings in September 2010, with the old buildings being demolished the following spring. It was one of the seven schools in the RSA Family of Academies, all in the West Midlands, of the Royal Society of Arts.

In September 2021, the school was renamed Gospel Oak School after the Royal Society of Arts renounced their association with the school.

== Senior staff ==
The Principal of the Academy is Mr Ross Trafford. Helen Tanner is Senior Vice Principal.

== School building ==
The school is housed in the same building that originally housed the RSA Academy from September 2010 to its rebranding in September 2021. This building was constructed by Willmott Dixon. A new block, located to the rear of the existing building, was constructed to house additional students the academy would be taking on following the closure of a local school nearby. This building was completed in 2019 and was constructed by Interserve.

== School day ==
The Academy operates a different school day from other schools, with lessons being 60 minutes long. Therefore there are five lessons per day. The Academy also follows a 5 term year, with 2 week holidays at the end of terms 1-4 and a 6 week summer holiday.

== Debatemate ==
The Academy takes part in the Birmingham area Debatemate. The aims of the scheme are to mentor pupils in debating and therefore improve their public speaking skills, literacy skills and general knowledge. Gospel Oak School compete in two of the Debatemate competitions; the Urban Debate League and the Debatemate Cup formerly known as the Richard Koch Cup.

== Derelict buildings fire ==
On the evening of 11 October 2010, the disused school buildings of the former Willingsworth High School were set on fire and around fifteen fire engines were sent to deal with the fire. Luckily nobody was hurt in the incident, and the police believed it may have been committed by the same arsonists who started a fire hours later at Wilkinson Primary School in nearby Bilston. The building's shell was demolished within the next six months.
