= Princes End branch line =

UK railway branch line

The Princes End branch line was a railway located in the West Midlands of England, which opened in September 1863 and survived as a through route for nearly 120 years.

Its route began on the West Coast Main Line railway just north of Tipton town centre and terminated approximately two miles away on the South Staffordshire Line just south of Wednesbury town centre.

It featured two stations. Princes End railway station opened in 1863 before closing in 1890. It re-opened in 1895 but closed in 1916 as a wartime economy measure and never re-opened, as happened with Ocker Hill railway station. However, the line remained open to goods trains, providing a useful link to Ocker Hill Power Station following its opening in 1897.

Following several years of declining use due to deindustrialisation of the local area, it finally closed in April 1981, although the final stub connecting Wednesbury to Ocker Hill Power Station remained open until February 1991, finally signalling the end of the whole line 128 years after its opening.

The section of disused line between Princes End and Ocker Hill was converted into a public walkway in the late 1980s.
