= Ocker Hill railway station =

Disused railway station in Ocker Hill, West Midlands

Ocker Hill

General information
- Location: Ocker Hill, West Midlands; England
- Coordinates: 52.5433°N 2.0393°W
- Grid reference: SO974939

Other information
- Status: Disused

History
- Original company: London and North Western Railway
- Pre-grouping: London and North Western Railway

Key dates
- 1 July 1864: Opened
- 1 November 1890: Closed
- 1 July 1895: Reopened
- 1 January 1916: Closed
Location

Ocker Hill railway station served the area of Ocker Hill, West Midlands, from 1864 to 1916 on the Princes End branch line.

== History ==
The station was opened on 1 July 1864 by the London and North Western Railway. Nearby was Ocker Hill Power Station, which opened in 1897. The station closed on 1 November 1890 but reopened on 1 July 1895, before closing permanently on 1 January 1916. The site is now a retirement home.

Preceding station	Disused railways	Following station
Princes End; Line and station closed	London and North Western Railway; Princes End branch line	Wednesbury Town; Line and station closed
