= Princes End railway station =

Disused railway station in Princes End, West Midlands

Princes End

General information
- Location: Princes End, West Midlands; England
- Coordinates: 52.5421°N 2.0618°W
- Grid reference: SO959938

Other information
- Status: Disused

History
- Original company: London and North Western Railway
- Pre-grouping: London and North Western Railway

Key dates
- 14 September 1863: Opened
- 1 November 1890: Closed
- 1 July 1895: Reopened
- 1 January 1916: Closed
Location

Princes End railway station served the area of Princes End, West Midlands, from 1864 to 1916 on the Princes End branch line.

== History ==
The station was opened on 14 September 1863 by the London and North Western Railway. It closed on 1 November 1890 but reopened on 1 July 1895, before closing permanently on 1 January 1916. The signal box survived into the 1980s.

Preceding station	Disused railways	Following station
Tipton; Station open, line closed	London and North Western Railway; Princes End branch line	Ocker Hill; Line and station closed
