= Anglesey Sidings =

Railway sidings in Staffordshire, England

The Anglesey Sidings is a former sidings terminal located on the South Staffordshire Line, Staffordshire, England, and served for a time as an oil terminal. The sidings are located on the other end of the A5 Watling Street in Brownhills near the border of Lichfield.

== History ==
The sidings were built to connect the South Staffordshire Line to the coal fields at Chasewater and Cannock Chase. This branch ran down Wharf Lane and connected near the present-day Chasewater Railway. They are named after the Welsh island of the same name, as the landowner Henry Paget, 1st Marquess of Anglesey who lived at Beaudesert Hall, gave permission for the site to be developed.

== Decline ==
The sidings were closed to Chasewater and Cannock Chase in the late 1960s. The sidings at Brownhills remained in use until 1984 when the section from Angelsea Sidings to Ryecroft Junction closed to all through traffic. The section through Hammerwich continued to serve the sidings for an oil terminal until 2001/02 when the entire line was closed. It was then left mothballed.

== Present day ==
Today, the branch at Wharf Lane has since become a public footpath. The section from Brownhills to Lichfield is now mothballed and out of use. It remains under the ownership of Network Rail. The section towards Walsall is now a leisure greenway.
