= Dudley Railway Tunnel =

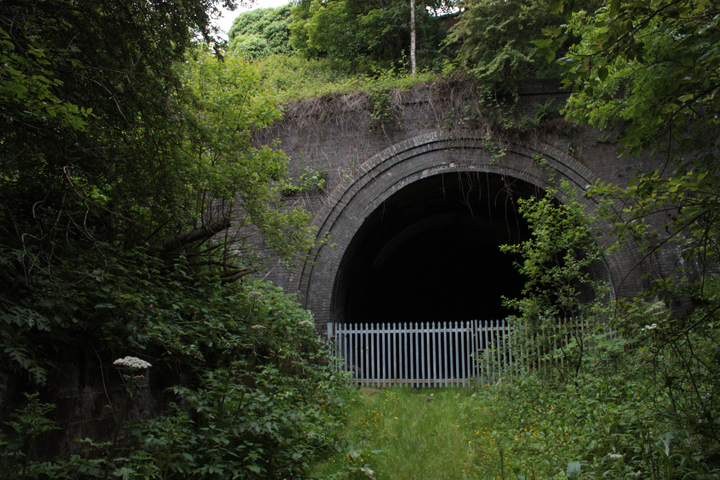
- The northern portal in 2011
- Interactive map of Dudley Railway Tunnel

Overview
- Line: Oxford-Worcester-Wolverhampton
- Location: Dudley, West Midlands, England
- Coordinates: 52.508392°N 2.078701°W
- OS grid reference: SO 94755 90058
- Status: Disused
- Start: Dudley railway station
- End: Blowers Green railway station
- No. of stations: 2

Operation
- Opened: 1850
- Closed: 19 March 1993

Technical
- No. of tracks: 2

Dudley Railway Tunnel is a railway tunnel located near to the former Dudley railway station in Dudley, West Midlands, England. It was opened in 1850 to allow the Oxford-Worcester-Wolverhampton Line between Stourbridge and Wolverhampton to pass for several hundred yards beneath a hilly area of Dudley which would have been difficult if not impossible to have constructed a railway through. At Dudley the OWWR and South Staffordshire Line to Walsall met.

The tunnel was regularly used by passenger trains until 1964, when the town's station closed along with the remaining passenger stations on the line, although goods trains were still allowed to use the line. It finally closed to all trains on 19 March 1993, when the section of railway between Walsall and Brierley Hill was closed after some 150 years in use. A cable laying train passed through the tunnel on 1 July 1993 - nearly four months after the line was officially closed.

The railway line through Dudley is scheduled to reopen from late 2024 as part of an extension to the West Midlands Metro, although the Metro route would not include the railway tunnel. By 2022, however, it was being used be used for test purposes by the Very Light Rail National Innovation Centre. The reutilised line will also be designed to carry freight trains for possible use in the future.

== Coordinates ==
Point	Coordinates (links to map & photo sources)
Northern portal	52.511631°N 2.075440°W
Midpoint	52.508392°N 2.078701°W
Southern portal	52.505303°N 2.082759°W
