= Brierley Hill railway station =

Disused railway station in the West Midlands, England

Brierley Hill
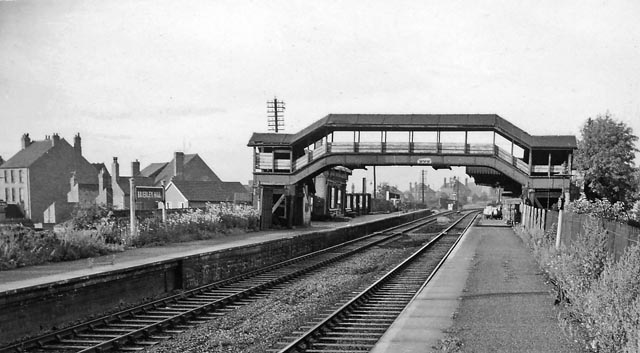
- The station in 1962

General information
- Location: Brierley Hill, Dudley Metropolitan Borough; England
- Coordinates: 52.4841°N 2.1273°W
- Grid reference: SO914873
- Platforms: 2

Other information
- Status: Disused

History
- Original company: Oxford, Worcester and Wolverhampton Railway
- Pre-grouping: Great Western Railway
- Post-grouping: Great Western Railway

Key dates
- 1858: Opened
- 30 July 1962: Closed
Location

Brierley Hill railway station served the town of Brierley Hill, in the West Midlands (historically Staffordshire), England. It was a stop on the Oxford-Worcester-Wolverhampton Line

== History ==
The station was opened in 1858. Two railways served the station: originally the Oxford, Worcester and Wolverhampton Railway and the South Staffordshire Railway, which later became the Great Western Railway and London, Midland and Scottish Railway (through amalgamation of the London and North Western Railway) respectively.

British Rail closed the station in 1962.

Preceding station	Disused railways	Following station
Round Oak	Oxford, Worcester and Wolverhampton Railway; Later Great Western Railway, then British Rail; Oxford-Worcester-Wolverhampton (1852-1962)	Brettell Lane
Round Oak	South Staffordshire Railway; Later LNWR, then LMS, finally BR; South Staffs Line Dudley-Stourbridge Junction section (1852-1962)	Brettell Lane

== The site today ==
The station's pedestrian entrance from Station Road is still in situ, though it has long been blocked off by a fence.

Goods trains still use the track where the station once stood, on their way to the nearby Round Oak Steel Terminal.

== Midland Metro development ==
In March 2011, a plan was submitted by Dudley Council to Network Rail to reopen the South Staffordshire Line, with passenger and freight trains between Stourbridge and Walsall.

Developments in 2017 raised hopes that passenger rail services would be restored over the entire line from Stourbridge Junction to Wednesbury, albeit in two sections. Between Brierley Hill and Wednesbury, work started to clear vegetation to prepare the route for a Metro line to be constructed, subject to a grant from the Government.

In March 2019, the West Midlands Combined Authority gave the final go-ahead for the cash to finance the Wednesbury to Brierley Hill rail link.

As at March 2025, the Wednesbury to Brierley Hill extension is expected to be delivered in two phases. The first phase to Dudley town centre is expected to open for passenger services in autumn 2025. Construction for the second phase to Merry Hill, in Brierley Hill, is expected to ramp-up concurrently, with finishing works for phase one in 2025.
