= Princes End =

Area of Sandwell, England

Coordinates: 52°32′31″N 2°03′54″W

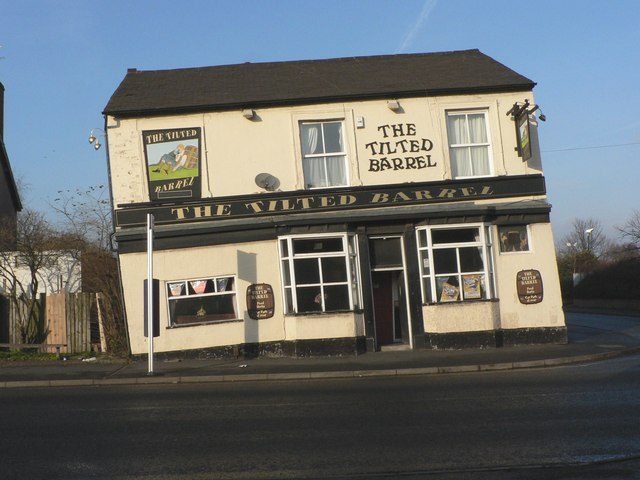
- View of Tilted Barrel Public House

- Location within the West Midlands
- Population: 14,391 (2011.Wards)
- OS grid reference: SO95679377
- Metropolitan borough: Sandwell Metropolitan Borough
- Metropolitan county: West Midlands
- Region: West Midlands
- Country: England
- Sovereign state: United Kingdom
- Post town: Bilston
- Postcode district: WV14
- Dialling code: 01384
- Police: West Midlands
- Fire: West Midlands
- Ambulance: West Midlands
- UK Parliament: Tipton and Wednesbury

Princes End is an area of Tipton, West Midlands, England, near the border with Coseley (of which approximately half of the area was part of until 1966), which was heavily developed during the 19th century with the construction of factories. The population of the Sandwell ward taken at the 2011 census was 12,981. Several hundred terraced houses were built around the same time to accommodate the factory workers. Many council houses were built in the area between 1920 and 1980, as well as many private houses.

== Neighbourhood ==
The centre of Princes End is situated on the A4037 Dudley - Wednesbury main road. It includes shops, flats and houses.

The established residential area of the Tibbington Estate and Ocker Hill area including the Glebefields Estate and Moat Farm Estates "Lost City" are part of Princes End Ward for Voting purposes only but not actually in Princes End itself.

Wednesbury Oak, originally a small settlement on the main road leading towards Wednesbury and Walsall, was expanded in the 1950s and 1960s with the development of a large private housing estate, which was originally in the Urban District of Coseley.

== Railway ==
Princes End had two railway stations, but neither are in existence now. One was Princes End and Coseley railway station, which was situated on the line between Dudley and Bilston. It closed in 1962 under the Beeching Axe and by the end of the 1960s the line was in total disuse.

The other station, Princes End railway station, closed in 1916 under a wartime economy measure, although the line - which ran to Wednesbury - remained open to goods trains until 1981, with the final stub leading up to Ocker Hill Power Station remaining open until 1991.

The former section of line between Princes End and Ocker Hill also marks the divide between Princes End and The Tibbington Estate, The Glebefields Estate and Moat Farm Estates "LOST CITY" That come under Ocker Hill and was converted into a public walkway at the end of the 1980s.

== Industry ==
Bloomfield Road has been home to the Angle Ring factory since 1951. The factory's buildings and land have been gradually expanded over the years, taking over a section of the Dudley to Bilston railway which closed in 1968. Opposite the Angle Ring factory stood the British Rolling Mills, which opened in the 19th century and remained in use until 2005 as part of Brymill. The buildings, including the offices and laboratories built in 1959, were demolished in the autumn of 2006 and gave way to housing. However, one of the more modern Brymill factory and office units still stands and although currently disused, has been retained for eventual sale due to its age.

== Bloomfield Infants School ==
Bloomfield Infants School was opened on Bloomfield Road in 1873, later becoming an annexe of Princes End Infants School. However, it closed in July 1967 after 94 years in use as a school and was briefly annexed into Princes End Infants School, but this was short-lived and the building was closed in the early 1970s and demolished a short time afterwards. The site of the school is now a scrapyard, which expanded in 2000 when the neighbouring Kings Arms public house (closed in the mid 1990s) was demolished.

== Unemployment ==
In the 2001 census, it was revealed that 10.9% of economically active people in Princes End were unemployed - more than double the national average at the time. The figure rose substantially after 2007 due to the Late 2000s recession, but was falling by 2015 as the economic recovery accelerated.

== Boundary changes ==
Although the bulk of Princes End was situated within the Tipton borders, until 1966 a significant percentage of the area formed part of Coseley urban district council until 1966, when the borders were rationalised and the whole area became part of West Bromwich borough (which most of Tipton had become part of) and from 1974 Sandwell, which was formed by a merger of West Bromwich and Warley. The historic boundary of Coseley and Tipton had seen at least one building in Princes End being divided between the two towns.

== See also ==
- List of closed railway stations in Britain
