= South Staffordshire line =

Former railway line in England

The South Staffordshire line is a partially mothballed and active former mainline that connects Burton-upon-Trent to Lichfield in Staffordshire and formerly then to the West Midlands towns of Walsall, Wednesbury, Dudley and Stourbridge. However, Dudley and Stourbridge were already joined to the Oxford, Worcester and Wolverhampton Railway's (OW&WR) line just north of Dudley Station. It in essence, continued to Stourbridge (Dudley and Stourbridge were later to become part of the West Midlands conurbation) along with Wednesbury and Walsall.

== History ==
The line was opened by the South Staffordshire Railway on 1 May 1850. This was soon to become part of the London and North Western Railway as far as Dudley station, which, in 1860, was opened as a joint venture with the OW&WR itself later to become amalgamated into the Great Western Railway. This station was built ten years after the original connection, however, and trains on the South Staffordshire line ran from Walsall to Stourbridge fairly early on. Dudley provided a useful change point for passengers from Walsall and Stourbridge to Wolverhampton, though this wasn't utilised to quite the effect the OW&WR had hoped, due to the similar connection at Dudley Port by the SSR with the Stour Valley Line – which today forms part of the West Midlands section of the West Coast Main Line.

To the north of Dudley Port, a link to the Birmingham Snow Hill- Wolverhampton Low Level route was added sometime between the inauguration of the line and the opening of Great Bridge South railway station in 1866. All three of the above – Dudley Port, Great Bridge and Wednesbury – were completed in 1850, and the line was then opened accordingly. All other stations on the route – from Lichfield to Walsall – were in operation from 1849.

== Route ==
The line began in Burton, it then continued to Lichfield Trent Valley running on a small section of the present-day Cross City Line. It then branched off south of Lichfield City towards Walsall via Hammerwich, Brownhills, Pelsall and Rushall. It then continued towards Dudley via Wednesbury, Great Bridge and Dudley Port. Dudley served as the terminus although some services continued onto Stourbridge on the Oxford, Worcester and Wolverhampton Railway. This allowed passengers to change for the other lines on the route at Lichfield, Walsall, Dudley and Stourbridge. The line also had sidings on certain parts of the route. Including at Angelsea Sidings, a branch to Wednesbury via Darlaston and sidings at Great Bridge and Dudley Freightliner Terminal.

== Landmarks ==
Just before Stourbridge, the OW&WR crossed (and continues to cross) the massive Stambermill Viaduct which is one of the local area's most significant landmarks. It also crossed Parkhead Viaduct just south of Dudley and for several hundred yards passed through Dudley Railway Tunnel. Another landmark on the route is a restored bridge over the M6 Toll at Brownhills which was built during the opening of the M6 Toll

== Places served by the line ==
The line officially began at Wychnor Junction, north of Lichfield, and ran through what is now Lichfield Trent Valley. Trains then continued through to Lichfield City itself. From there, a plethora of stations along the route were served. The line continued through to Walsall and a low-level station at Dudley Port. This was technically the terminus of the line but it was connected to the OW&WR's line which ran through Dudley itself from 1860. It went on to serve other stations at the south-western extremity of the Black Country at Stourbridge Junction.

The towns and villages the line formerly served before joining the OW&W railway were:

- Burton
- Branston
- Barton-under-Needwood and Walton-on-Trent
- Alrewas
- Lichfield
- Hammerwich (also served Burntwood)
- Angelsea Sidings
- Brownhills
- Pelsall
- Rushall
- Walsall
- Darlaston
- Wednesbury
- Great Bridge
- Dudley Port
- Dudley

== Services ==
Services began at Burton and terminated at either Walsall, Dudley or Stourbridge. There was also a Derby to Wolverhampton service that also ran on the line via the northern end at Walsall to Lichfield. When the section to Dudley closed to passengers in 1964, the Burton section continued to see a rapid decline in use from passengers, resulting in the section to Burton closing to passengers in 1965.

== Closure ==
=== Burton-Lichfield-Walsall (Northern Section) ===
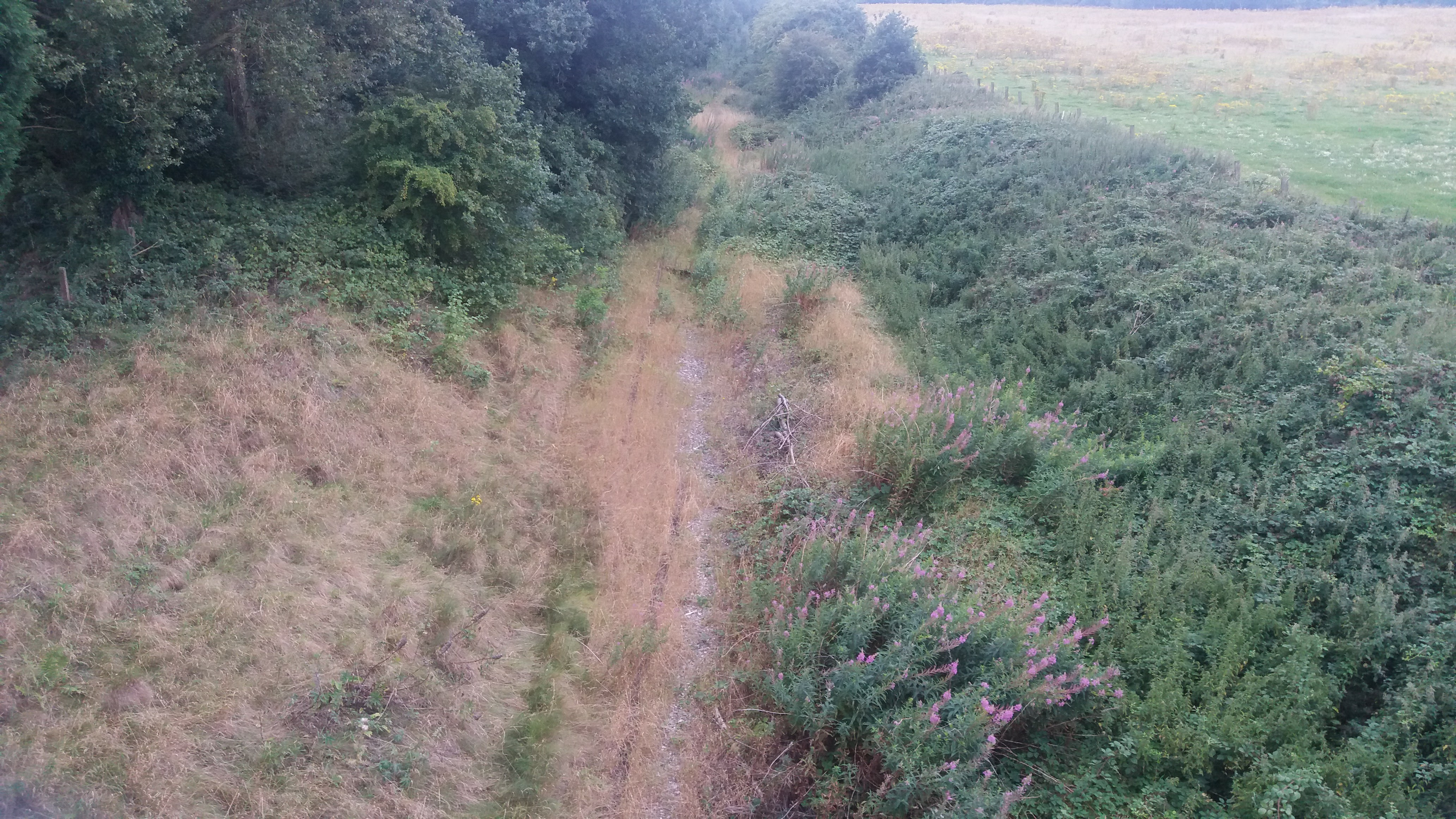
Track still in situ looking towards Brownhills at Hammerwich.

Freight used the northern section of the line after closure to passengers and continued to do so until the section from Angelsea Sidings to Ryecroft Junction was closed to all traffic when the last train ran along the line 1984 and the track being lifted two years later. A stub from Angelsea Sidings to Lichfield City continued to see usage to serve an oil terminal at Newtown, Brownhills until 2001, when the stub was closed and mothballed by Network Rail.

The section from Lichfield to Burton is still open for freight traffic and depot returning trains. The line sees one passenger service a week though is used for diversions.

=== Walsall-Dudley-Stourbridge (Southern Section) ===
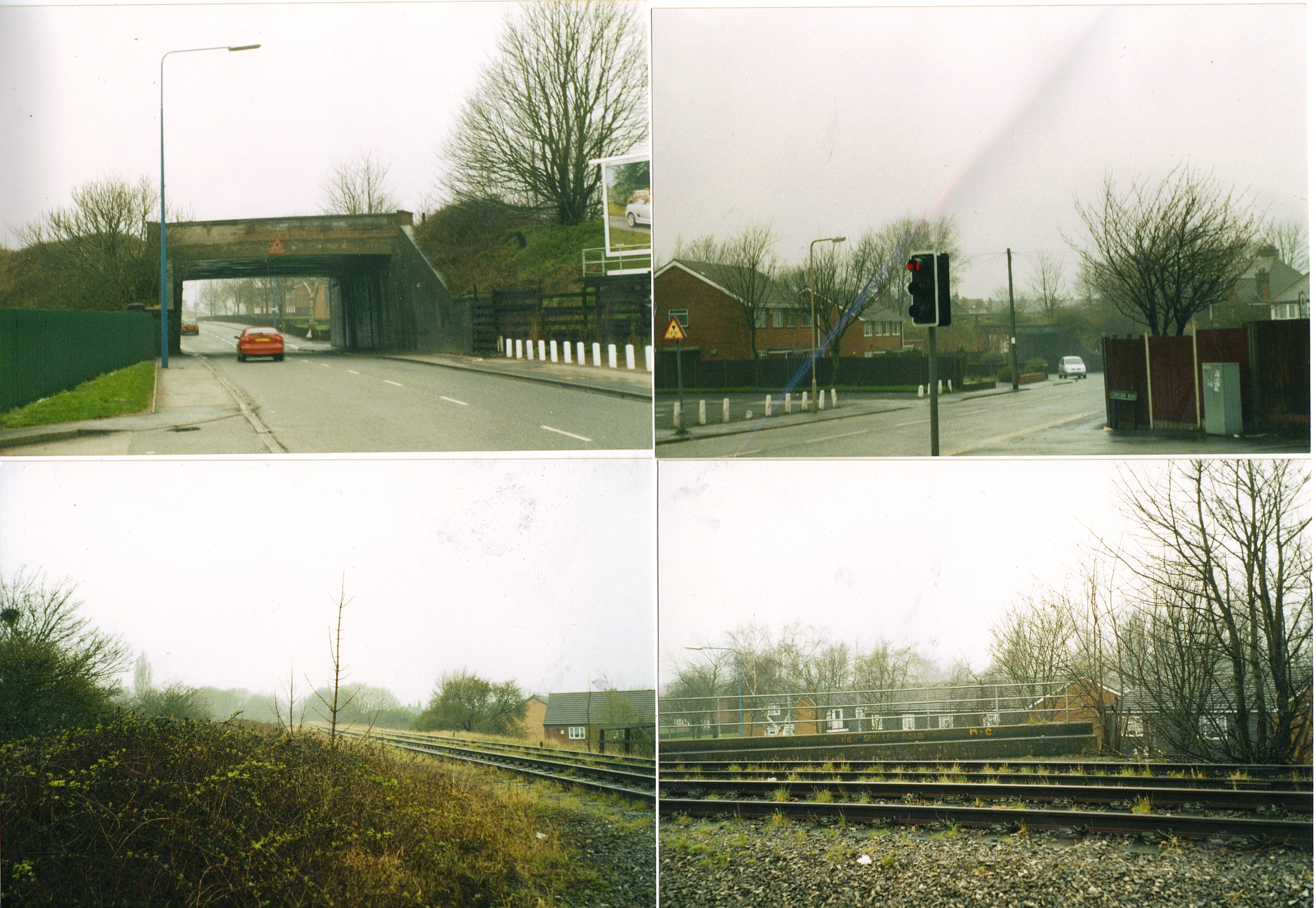
The closed railway lines that once ran between Dudley port and Dudley's freight liner depot in 2001.

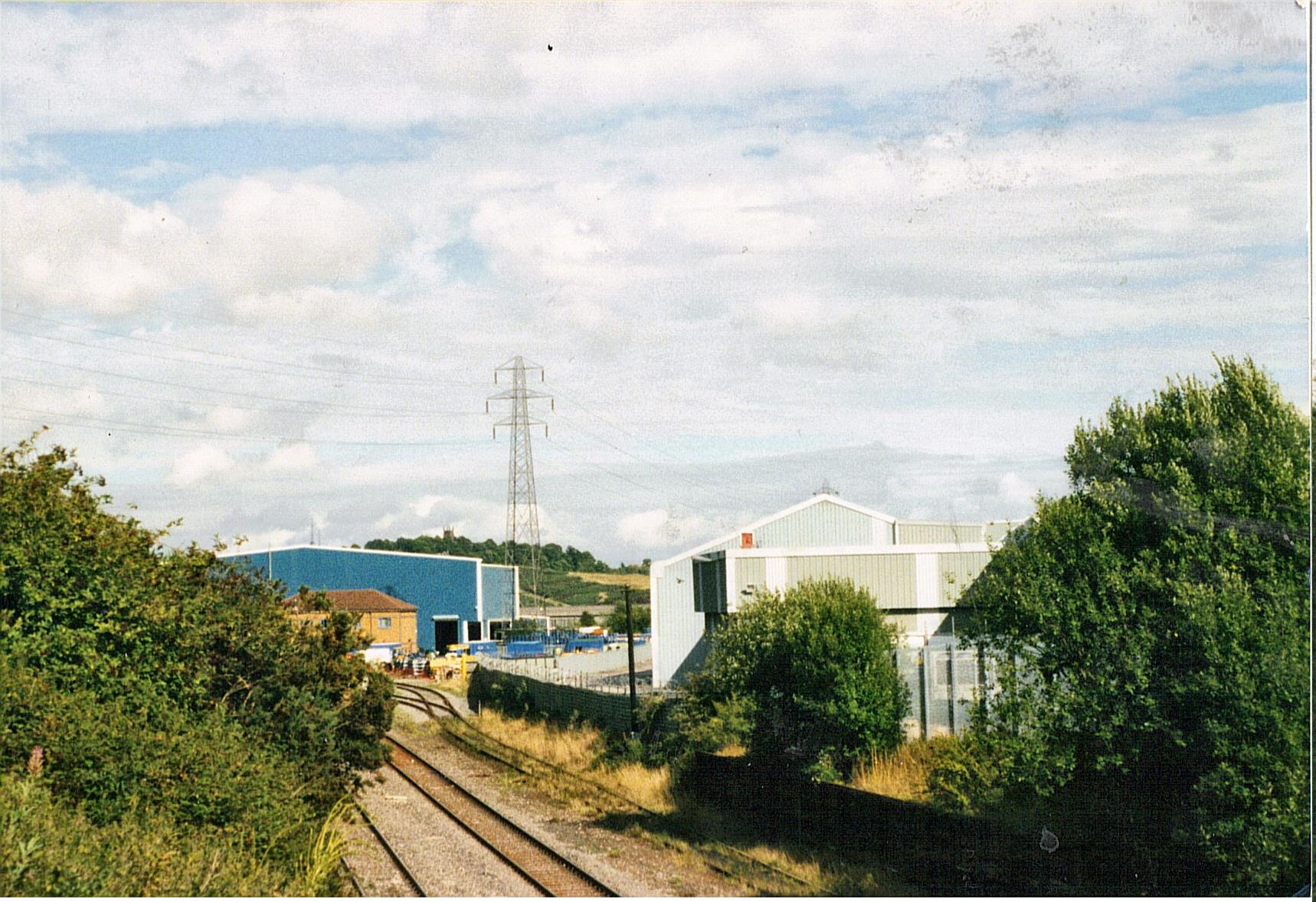
A picture of Round Oak steel terminal in 2005.

Despite the withdrawal of all passenger services and the complete closure of the line between Dudley and Bilston by 1968, the southern section of the line was still used by freight as a diversion line and to serve Dudley Freightliner Terminal. The terminal closed in 1989 although the line remained in use until the section between Walsall and Harts Hill on the border of Dudley and Brierley Hill closed in 1993.

== Present day ==
=== Northern Section ===
The section from Burton to Lichfield remains open to freight traffic and Voyager trains returning to a depot near Barton. The section from Lichfield to Brownhills remains in situ but mothballed. Beyond Angelsea Sidings, the section from Angelsea Sidings to Rushall is now a public greenway. Ryecroft Junction remains open for traffic on the Chase Line and Sutton Park Line. There has been multiple proposals to reopening the northern section including:

- The Connecting Communities: Expanding Access to the Rail Network suggested reopening of the Walsall-Lichfield section for passenger services with new stations at Pelsall and Brownhills which identified the line as viable for reopening but nothing has become of the scheme so far.
- In a strategy which has been conducted by the West Midlands Combined Authority, the line from Walsall to Lichfield has been identified as a disused rail corridor and this means that it is a long-term ambition to reopen the line from Walsall to Lichfield as either a rail/light rail corridor. There are also aspirations to reconnect the disused line at Wednesbury to Walsall as either rail or tram.
- In January 2019, the Campaign for Better Transport released a report identifying the line which was listed as Priority 2 for reopening. Priority 2 is for those lines which require further development or a change in circumstances (such as housing developments).
- In June 2019, the Derby Telegraph released an article showing support being built for the reopening of the South Staffordshire Line for trams from Stourbridge Junction to Burton on Trent. According to the article, London-based consultants Cushman and Wakefield had put forward suggestions to both Staffordshire County Council and East Staffordshire Borough Council. Suggestions to look at bringing trams into Burton to promote tourism and businesses. Among the suggestions was the following quote from the article:

"The report is part of the Burton upon Trent Regeneration Strategy which looks at how the town could be improved for its shoppers, employees and visitors up to 2030 and beyond. If given the go-ahead, the tram trains could take passengers on the existing Ivanhoe freight line and the Worcester to Derby Main Line Railway between Stourbridge and Burton." This was among the support for reopening the Leicester to Burton upon Trent line which closed in the 1960s along with the South Staffordshire Line.

=== Southern Section ===
The line from Bescot to Harts Hill closed in 1993 and was mothballed. By this stage, plans were afoot for the section planned between Wednesbury and Brierley Hill via Dudley to become part of the Midland Metro. This plan involve using sections of the former track. A light rail test centre at Dudley opened in 2021 and is being used for rolling stock of trams as far as Castle Hill using the Dudley Railway Tunnel. There would also be passive provisions to allow heavy rail to run the section for freight and potential passenger services. The proposals for the line include:

- To run a passenger service between Stourbridge Junction and Brierley Hill, with stations being re-opened along the OWWR, including Brierley Hill. The service would be operated by railcars built by Parry People Movers, who built the Class 139 units which run the Stourbridge Town service.
- The re-opening of the line between Wednesbury and Brierley Hill had received government backing, and work is set to begin in 2017.
- The scheme had been awarded backing by the government and the councils at Sandwell and Dudley. The scheme also has been discussed by TfWM and Network Rail as the line remains from Stourbridge Junction to Walsall in the ownership of Network Rail.
- TfWM (Transport for West Midlands) and Midland Metro Alliance began negotiations with Network Rail regarding the sharing of the line from the former level crossing at Potters Lane which is where the disused Wednesbury Town station was to Harts Hill where the goods trains would serve both the Round Oak Steel Terminal and connect to the mainline at Stourbridge Junction.
- In 2021 the Very Light Rail National Innovation Centre was opened on the site of the former Dudley Freightliner Terminal. This utilises the trackbed from the site of Dudley to Blowers Green, including Dudley Railway Tunnel.

The final northern section of the route between Wednesbury and Walsall was surprisingly omitted from the Midland Metro plan, despite its close connection to Walsall town centre and the large post-1990 retail development near Junction 9 of the M6 Motorway, although this section has been earmarked for a possible reopening for freight trains and some form of passenger services.

=== Restoring Your Railway ===
In March 2020, two bids were made to the Restoring Your Railway fund to get funds for a feasibility study into reinstating the section of the line between Lichfield Trent Valley and Burton-on-Trent and the line between Stourbridge Junction and Brierley Hill. This bid was unsuccessful.

== See also ==
- Oxford, Worcester and Wolverhampton Railway
- London and North Western Railway
