= List of closed railway stations in the West Midlands =

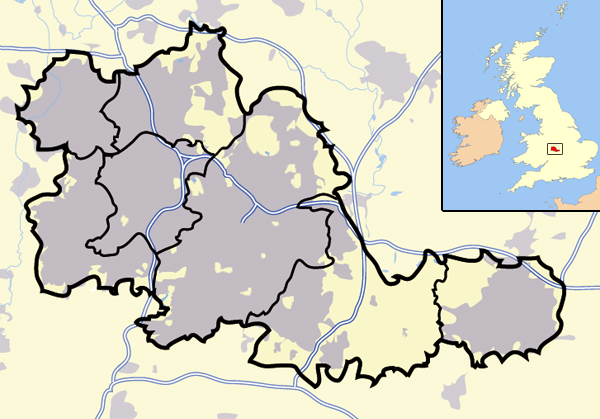
Map of the West Midlands

This is a list of disused railway stations within the county of West Midlands, a metropolitan county in central England which includes the cities of Birmingham, Coventry and Wolverhampton. It includes all railway stations in the West Midlands that no longer currently have regular timetabled train services.

== Railway stations ==
Station	Modern local authority	Opened	Closed	Notes
Albion	Sandwell	1853	1960	
Arley	Wyre Forest	1862	1963	Now preserved as part of the Severn Valley Railway
Baptist End	Dudley	1905	1964	
Bentley	Walsall	1872	1898	
Bewdley	Wyre Forest	1862	1970	Now preserved as part of the Severn Valley Railway
Bilston Central	Wolverhampton	1854	1972	
Bilston West	Wolverhampton	1854	1962	
Blowers Green	Dudley	1878	1962	
Bradley and Moxley	Wolverhampton	1862	1915	
Brettell Lane	Dudley	1852	1962	
Brierley Hill	Dudley	1858	1962	
Brighton Road	Birmingham	1875	1941	
Brockmoor Halt	Dudley	1925	1932	
Bromley Halt	Dudley	1925	1932	
Brownhills	Walsall	1849	1965	
Brownhills Watling Street	Walsall	1884	1930	
Bushbury	Wolverhampton	1852	1912	
Compton Halt	Wolverhampton	1925	1932	
Camp Hill	Birmingham	1840	1941	Investigating whether or not to re-open as part of the upcoming Camp Hill Line (assuming construction of the Bordesley Chords), expected by the end of 2025, to be named Balsall Heath.
Coundon Road	Coventry	1860	1965	
Curzon Street	Birmingham	1838	1854	Used by excursion trains until 1893. Due to reopen to accommodate HS2 trains to and from London.
Daimler Halt	Coventry	1917	1965	
Daisy Bank	Wolverhampton	1854	1962	Closed 1916-1919
Darby End	Dudley	1905	1964	
Darlaston	Walsall	1863	1887	
Dudley	Dudley	1860	1964	
Dunstall Park	Wolverhampton	1896	1968	
Ettingshall Road	Wolverhampton	1852	1964	
Gornal Halt	Dudley	1925	1932	
Great Bridge North	Sandwell	1850	1964	
Great Bridge South	Sandwell	1866	1964	Closed 1915-1920
Hagley Road	Birmingham	1874	1934	
Handsworth and Smethwick	Birmingham	1854	1972	
Harborne	Birmingham	1874	1934	
Harts Hill	Dudley	1895	1916	
Heath Town	Wolverhampton	1872	1910	
Hockley	Birmingham	1854	1972	
Icknield Port Road	Birmingham	1874	1931	
Lifford	Birmingham	1885	1941	
Monmore Green	Wolverhampton	1863	1916	
Monument Lane	Birmingham	1854	1958	
North Walsall	Walsall	1872	1925	
Old Hill High Street	Dudley	1905	1964	
Pelsall	Walsall	1849	1965	
Penns	Birmingham	1879	1965	
Pensnett Halt	Dudley	1925	1932	
Pleck	Walsall	1881	1958	Closed 1917-1924
Portobello	Wolverhampton	1837	1873	
Priestfield	Wolverhampton	1854	1972	
Princes End and Coseley	Sandwell	1853	1962	
Rood End	Sandwell	1867	1885	
Rotton Park Road	Birmingham	1874	1934	
Round Oak	Dudley	1852	1962	
Rushall railway station, West Midlands	Walsall	1849	1909	
Short Heath	Walsall	1872	1931	
Smethwick West	Sandwell	1867	1996	
Soho	Birmingham	1867	1949	
Soho & Winson Green	Birmingham	1854	1972	
Somerset Road	Birmingham	1876	1930	
Spon Lane	Sandwell	1852	1960	
Streetly	Walsall	1879	1965	
Swan Village	Sandwell	1854	1972	
Tettenhall	Wolverhampton	1925	1932	
Tipton Five Ways	Sandwell	1853	1962	
Walsall Wood	Walsall	1884	1930	
Wednesbury Central	Sandwell	1854	1972	
Wednesbury Town	Sandwell	1850	1964	
Wednesfield	Wolverhampton	1872	1931	
Wednesfield Heath	Wolverhampton	1837	1873	
West Bromwich	Sandwell	1854	1972	
Willenhall Stafford Street	Walsall	1872	1931	
Windmill End	Dudley	1878	1964	
Winson Green	Birmingham	1867	1957	
Wolverhampton Low Level	Wolverhampton	1854	1972	Continued in use for goods traffic until 1981
Wood Green	Walsall	1881	1941	

== See also ==
- List of West Midlands railway stations
- List of closed railway stations in Britain
- List of closed railway stations in London
- Closed London Underground stations
- List of London Underground stations
- List of Docklands Light Railway stations
- List of London railway stations
- List of Parkway railway stations in Britain
- List of railway stations in Merseyside
- List of railway stations in Wales
