= Netherton railway station (Dudley) =

Disused railway station in Netherton, Dudley

Netherton

General information
- Location: Netherton, West Midlands, Dudley; England
- Coordinates: 52.5034°N 2.0859°W
- Grid reference: SO942895

Other information
- Status: Disused

History
- Original company: Great Western Railway
- Pre-grouping: Great Western Railway

Key dates
- 20 December 1852: Opened
- 1 March 1878: Closed
Location

Netherton railway station served the town of Netherton, Dudley, England, from 1852 to 1878 on the Oxford, Worcester and Wolverhampton Railway.

== History ==
The station was opened on 20 December 1852 by the Great Western Railway. It was situated southwest of New Road. It obstructed the Bumble Hole line so it closed on 1 March 1878 and it was replaced by a new station that was later known as Blowers Green. Nothing remains.

Preceding station	Historical railways	Following station
Round Oak; Line open, station closed	Great Western Railway; Oxford, Worcester and Wolverhampton Railway	Dudley; Line open, station closed
