= Windmill End railway station =

Former railway station in England

Windmill End
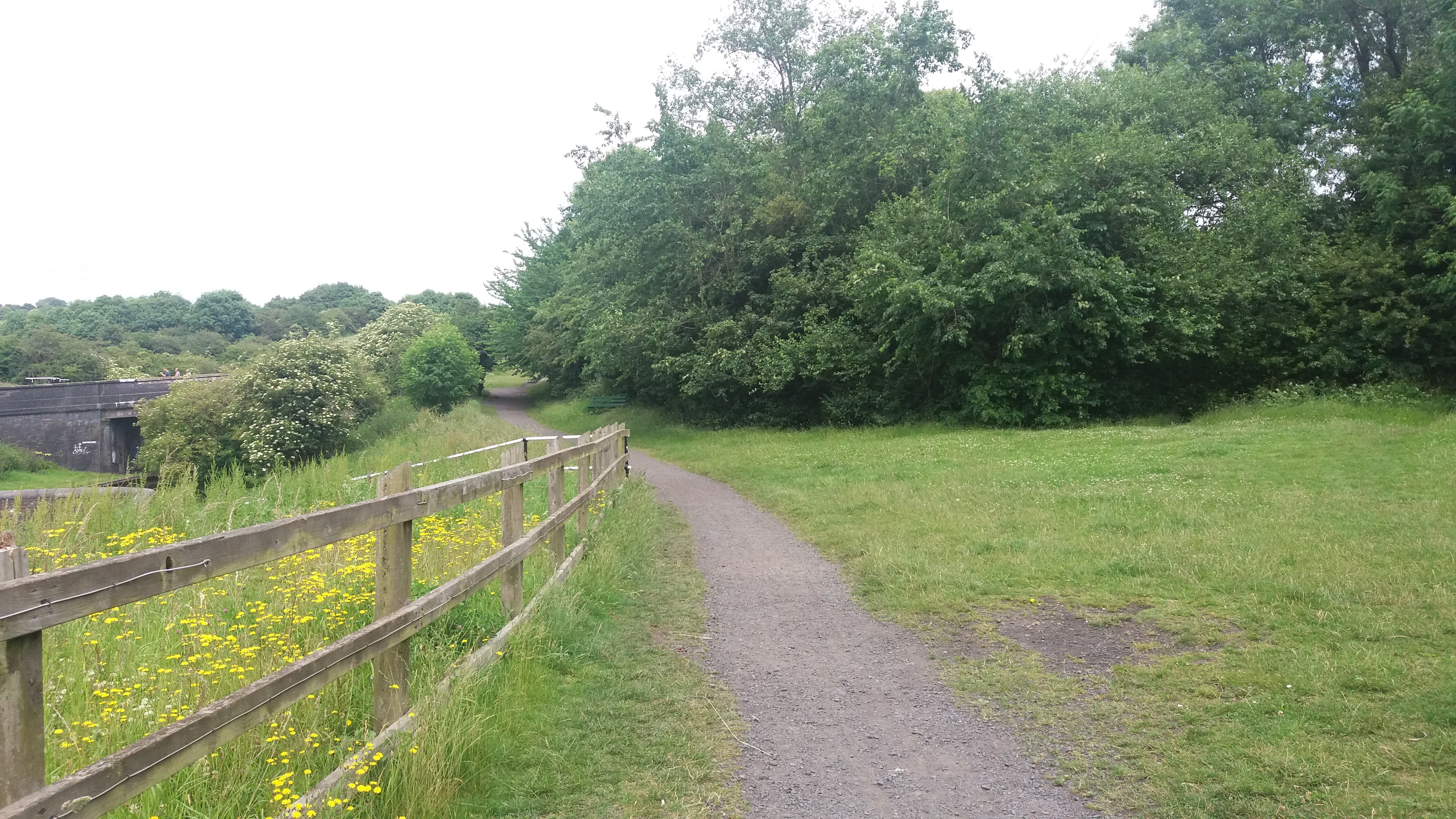
- Station site, south-east of Windmill End canal junction.

General information
- Location: Darby End, Dudley; England
- Coordinates: 52.49079°N 2.06873°W
- Grid reference: SO954881
- Platforms: 2

Other information
- Status: Disused

History
- Original company: Great Western Railway
- Pre-grouping: Great Western Railway
- Post-grouping: Great Western Railway

Key dates
- 1 March 1878: Opened
- 15 June 1964: Closed
Location

Windmill End railway station was a station on the former Great Western Railway's Bumble Hole Line between Blowers Green and Old Hill.

It opened in 1878, was destaffed in 1952 and closed in 1964. Its name was immortalised in that year as the closing words of the song "Slow Train" by Flanders and Swann. The railway, however, remained open for another four years.

The site of the railway and the station had been obliterated by the end of the 1970s. It has now been largely reclaimed by nature.

| Preceding station | Disused railways | Following station |
|---|---|---|
| Baptist End | Great Western Railway; Later British Rail; Bumble Hole Line (1878-1964) | Darby End |
