= Round Oak Steel Terminal =

Rail terminal in the West Midlands of England

Coordinates: 52°28′49″N 2°07′51″W

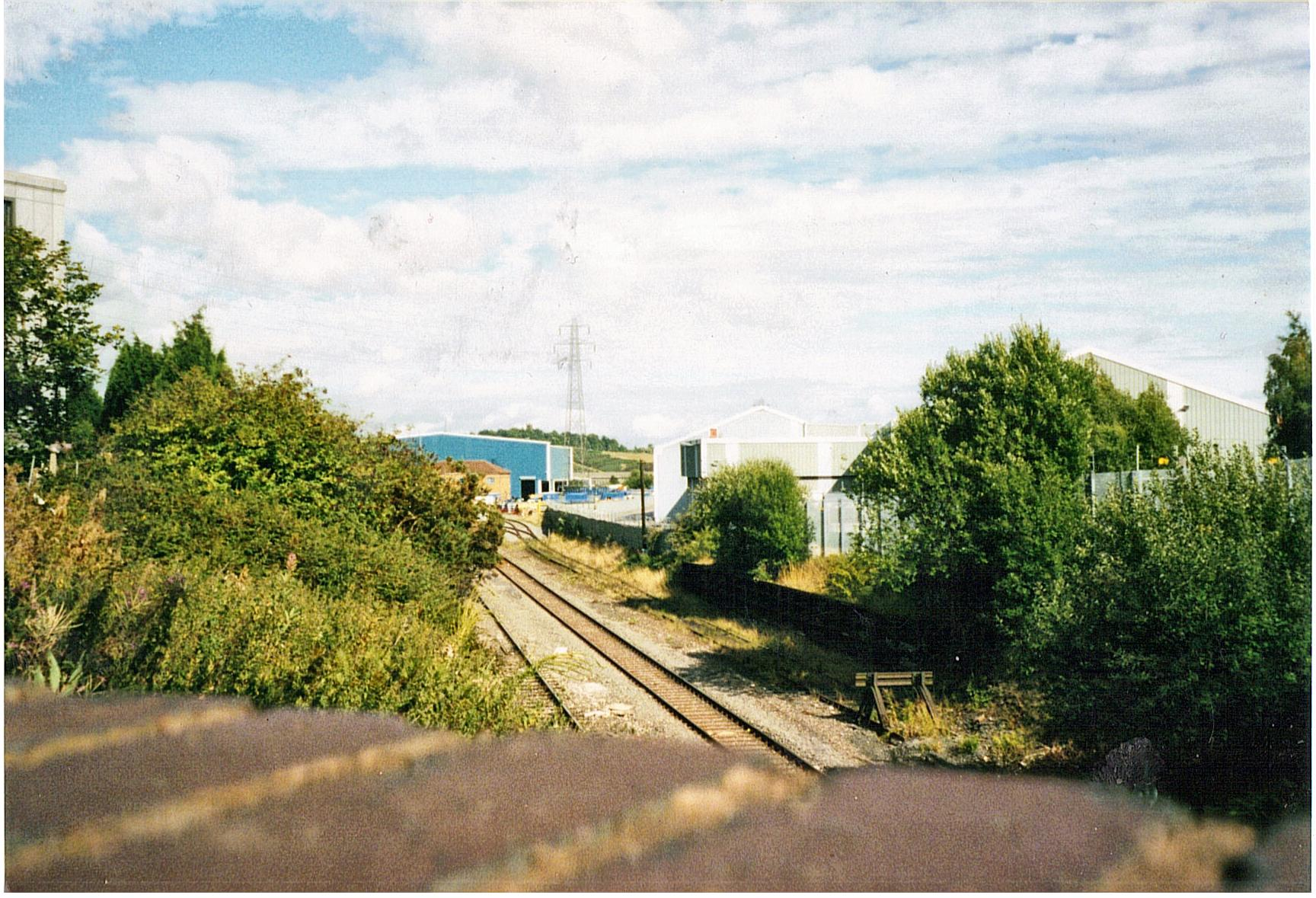
Round Oak Steel Terminal in 2005.

Round Oak Steel Terminal is a railway freight terminal dealing in steel from the Round Oak Steel Works until 1982 and from other sources thereafter, in Brierley Hill, West Midlands, England managed by Tata Steel Europe.

== History ==
The project was given a government grant in 1984, and the terminal opened on 21 August 1986, replacing the nearby Brierley Hill goods yard, and is situated on the former Oxford-Worcester-Wolverhampton Line north of Stourbridge Junction. The line north of Stourbridge and south of Blowers Green railway station was closed pre-Beeching in 1962 except for freight traffic, and trains run to Round Oak Steel Terminal and the nearby Moor Lane Goods Yard.

The terminal consists of sidings adjacent to factories. Just after the terminal, the railway line ceases to be in use at the Highgate Road overbridge, Harts Hill. The line beyond here was closed in 1993 and most of the track between there and the Blowers Green overbridge (approximately one mile away) has been removed, though the line is set to re-open during the 2020s as a shared line between freight trains and West Midlands Metro trams (the latter running as far as Wednesbury).

== Today's usage ==
Trains arrive at the terminal from Llanwern steelworks and Margam. They are generally hauled by Class 60s, although the general replacement of this locomotive with Class 66 locomotives has meant the latter now appears just as often.

There are seven services operating from the Terminal on all weekdays except Friday, where just four operate.

There are no booked trains on a Saturday, but three trains operate on a Sunday.

Additionally, a trial scrap train ran from the Terminal to Cardiff Tidal on 14 and 15 February 2007. This now runs when required, on Fridays from Moor Lane Goods Yard.

== West Midlands Metro ==
A regeneration project will see the former Round Oak station become part of the local tram network with the line reopening between Walsall, Dudley Port, Dudley and the Merry Hill Shopping Centre for trams on one track and for freight on the other. The freight trains would continue on past Brettel Lane station and on to the main line at Stourbridge Junction. The closed section of railway through Dudley is expected to re-open, as a combined West Midlands Metro tramway and a heavy rail line for goods trains.

== Imagery of the site ==
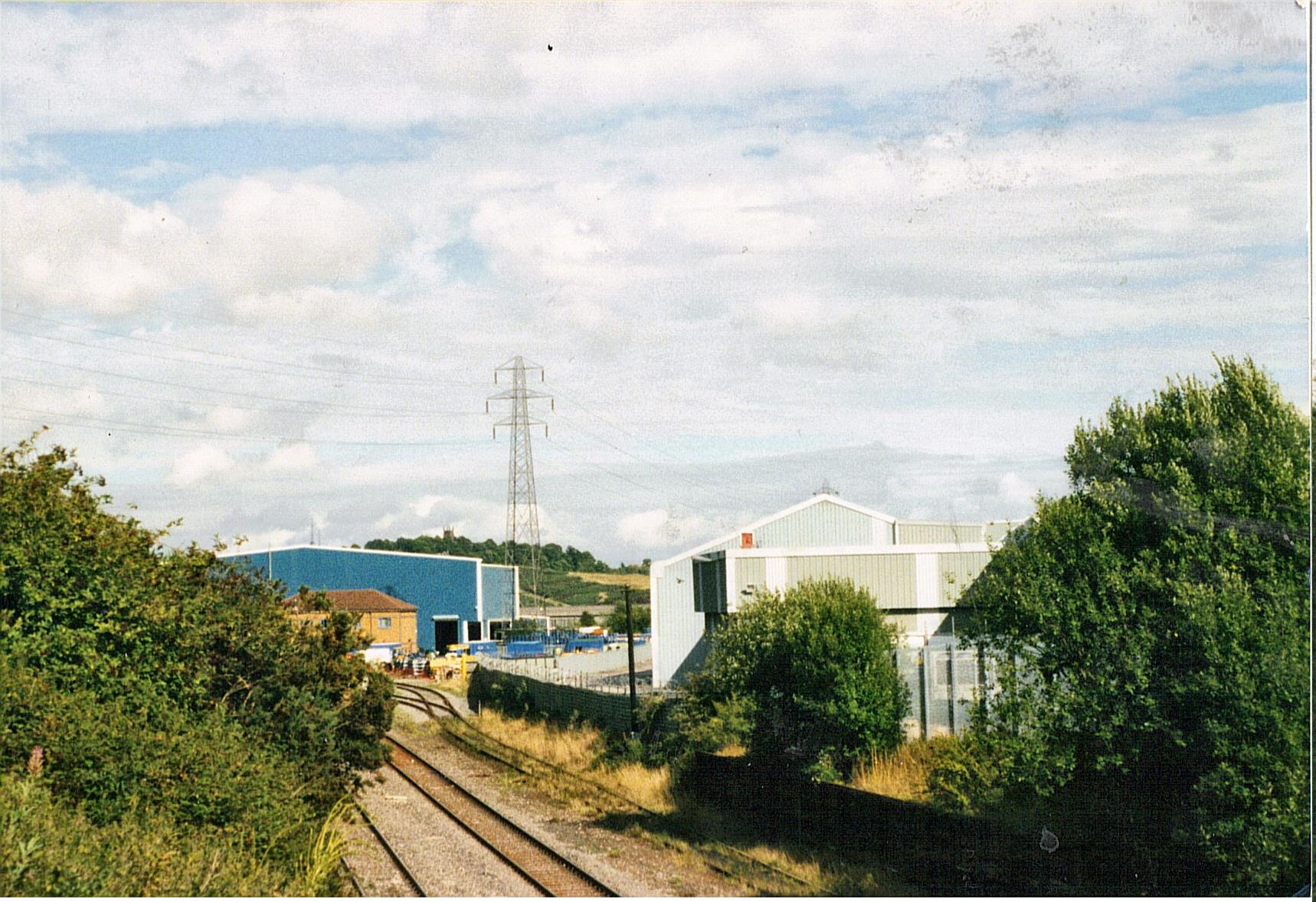
Round Oak steel terminal in 2005

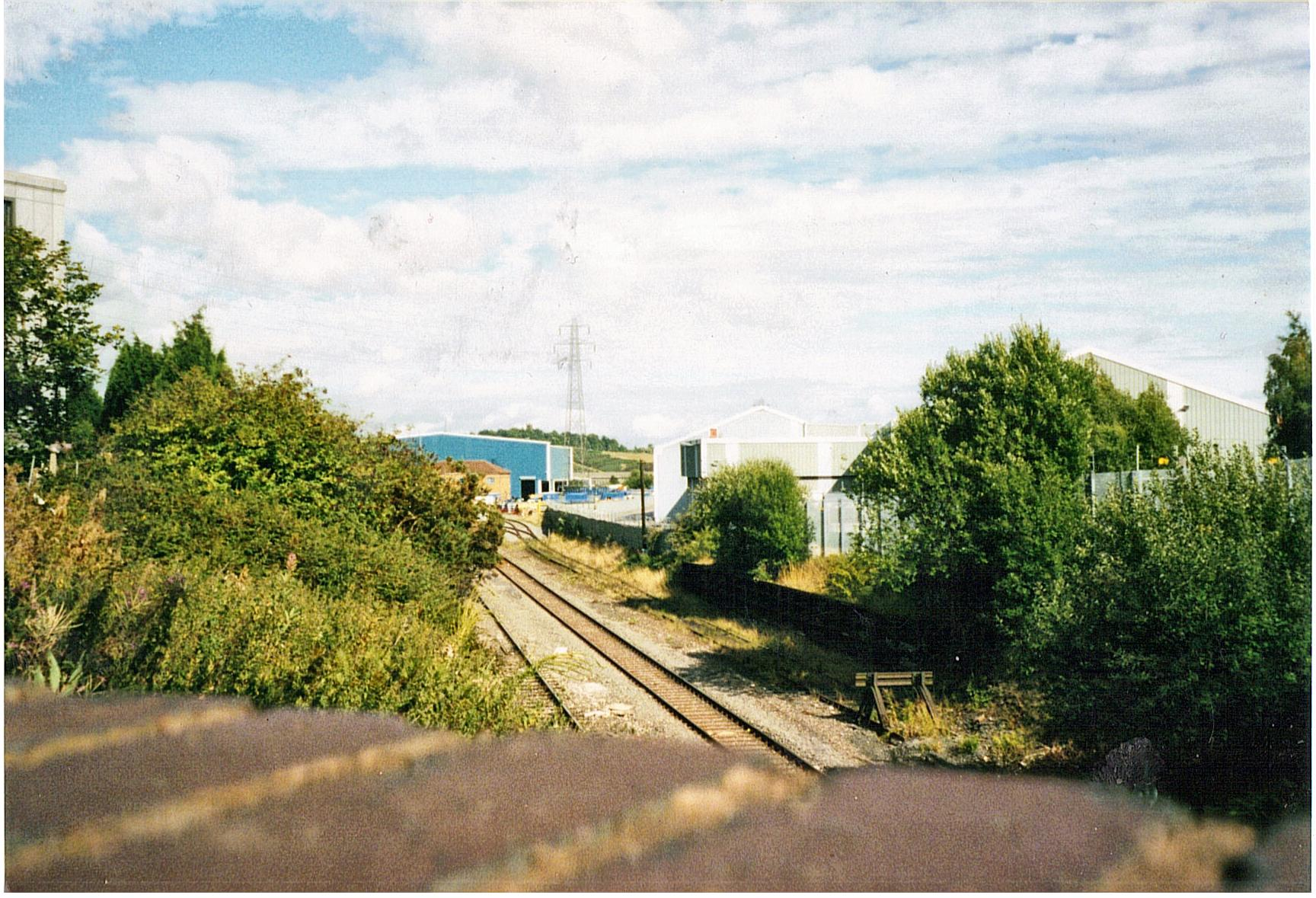
Round Oak steel terminal in 2005

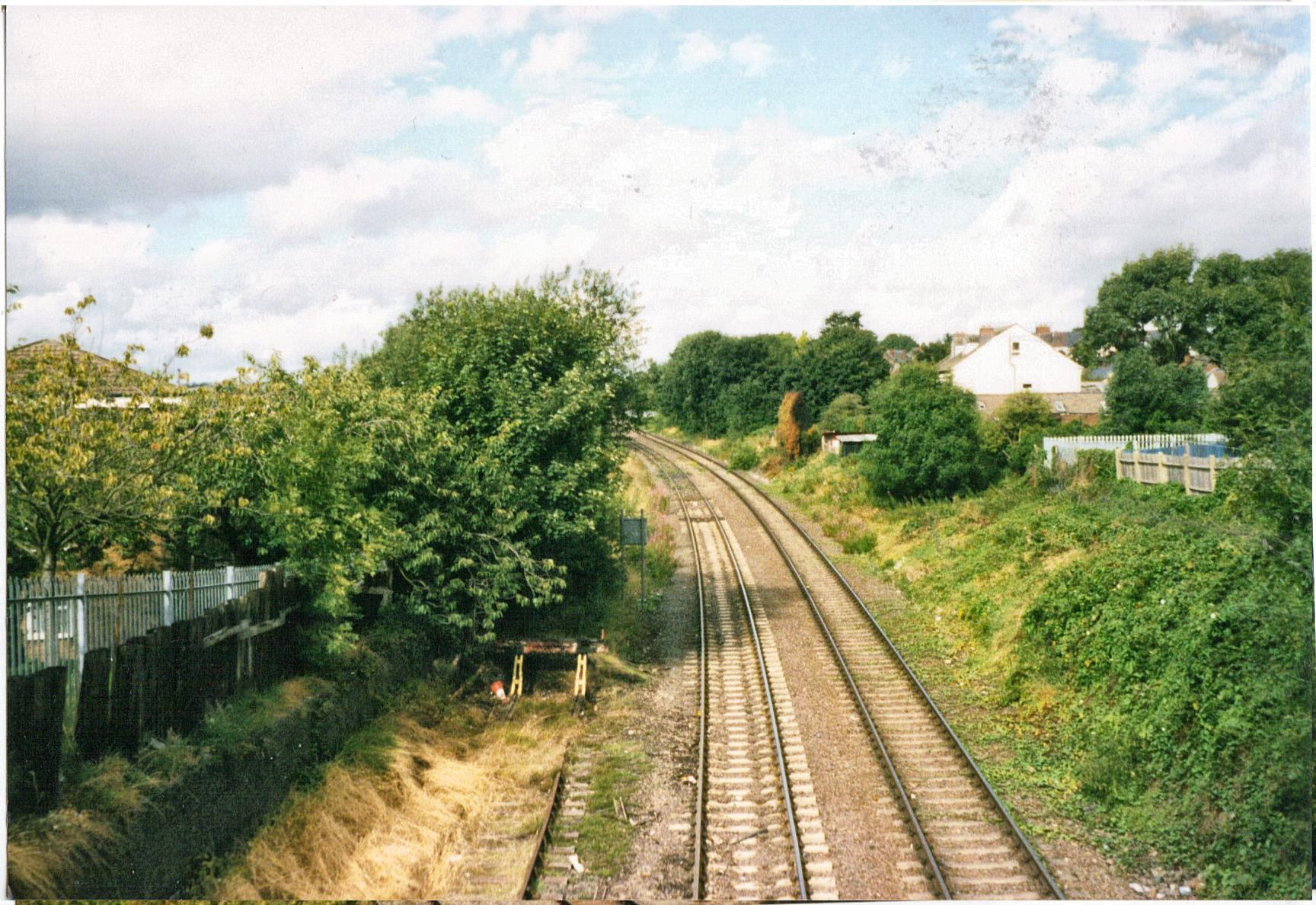
Round Oak steel terminal in 2005
