= Old Hill High Street railway station =

Former railway station in England

Old Hill High Street
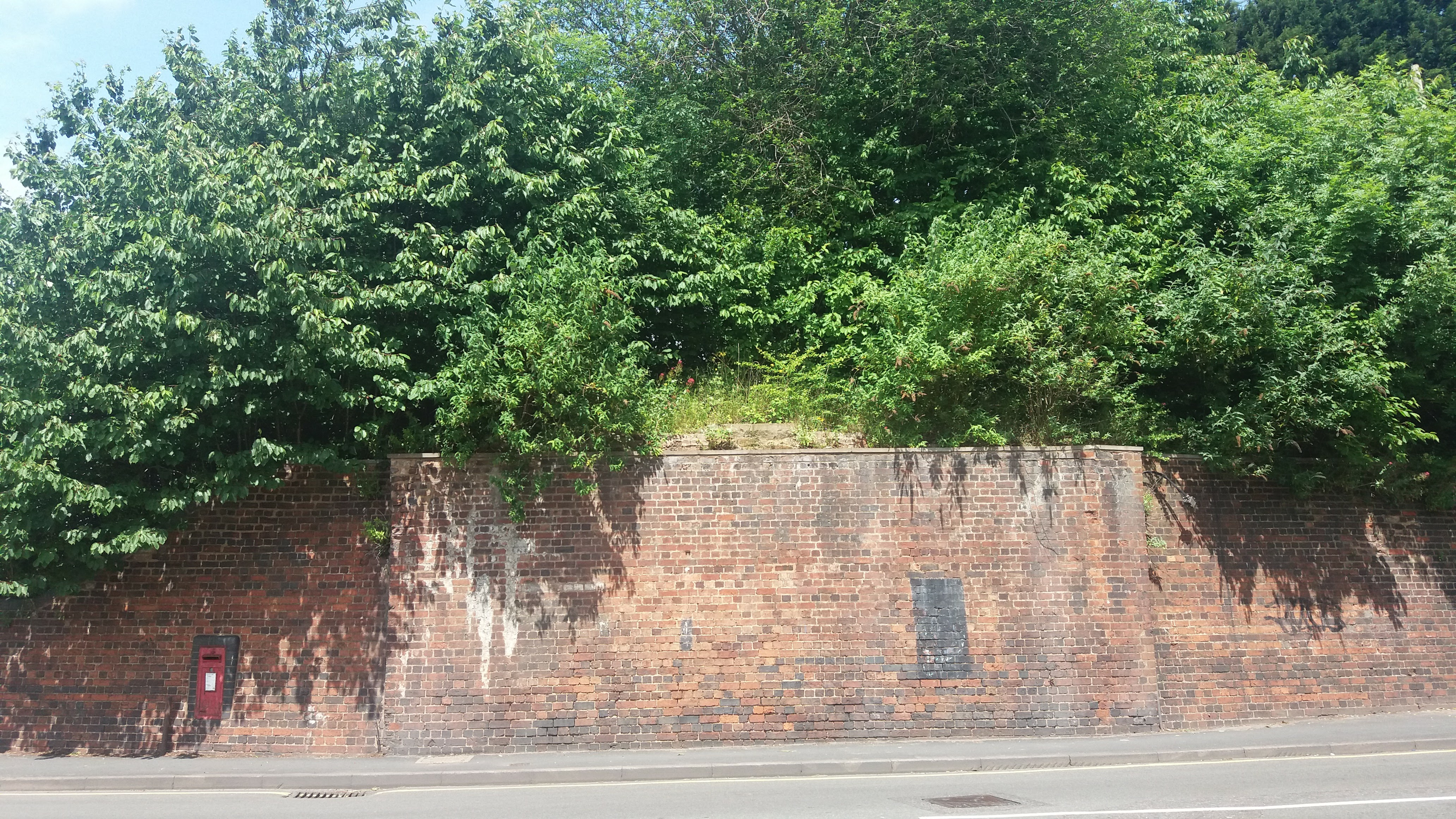
- Former railway bridge support near Old Hill High Street station site.

General information
- Location: Old Hill, Sandwell; England
- Coordinates: 52.4780°N 2.0617°W
- Grid reference: SO959866
- Platforms: 2

Other information
- Status: Disused

History
- Original company: Great Western Railway
- Pre-grouping: Great Western Railway
- Post-grouping: Great Western Railway

Key dates
- 21 August 1905: Opened
- 15 June 1964: Closed
Location

Old Hill High Street railway station was a station on the former Great Western Railway's Bumble Hole Line between Blowers Green and Old Hill. It was the second of the two stations in Old Hill, and its location in reference to the town centre was significantly more convenient than the station which exists today.

It opened in 1905 and closed in 1964.

Preceding station	Disused railways	Following station
Darby End	Great Western Railway; Later British Rail; Bumble Hole Line (1878-1964)	Old Hill
