= Harts Hill railway station =

Former railway station in the West Midlands, England

Harts Hill
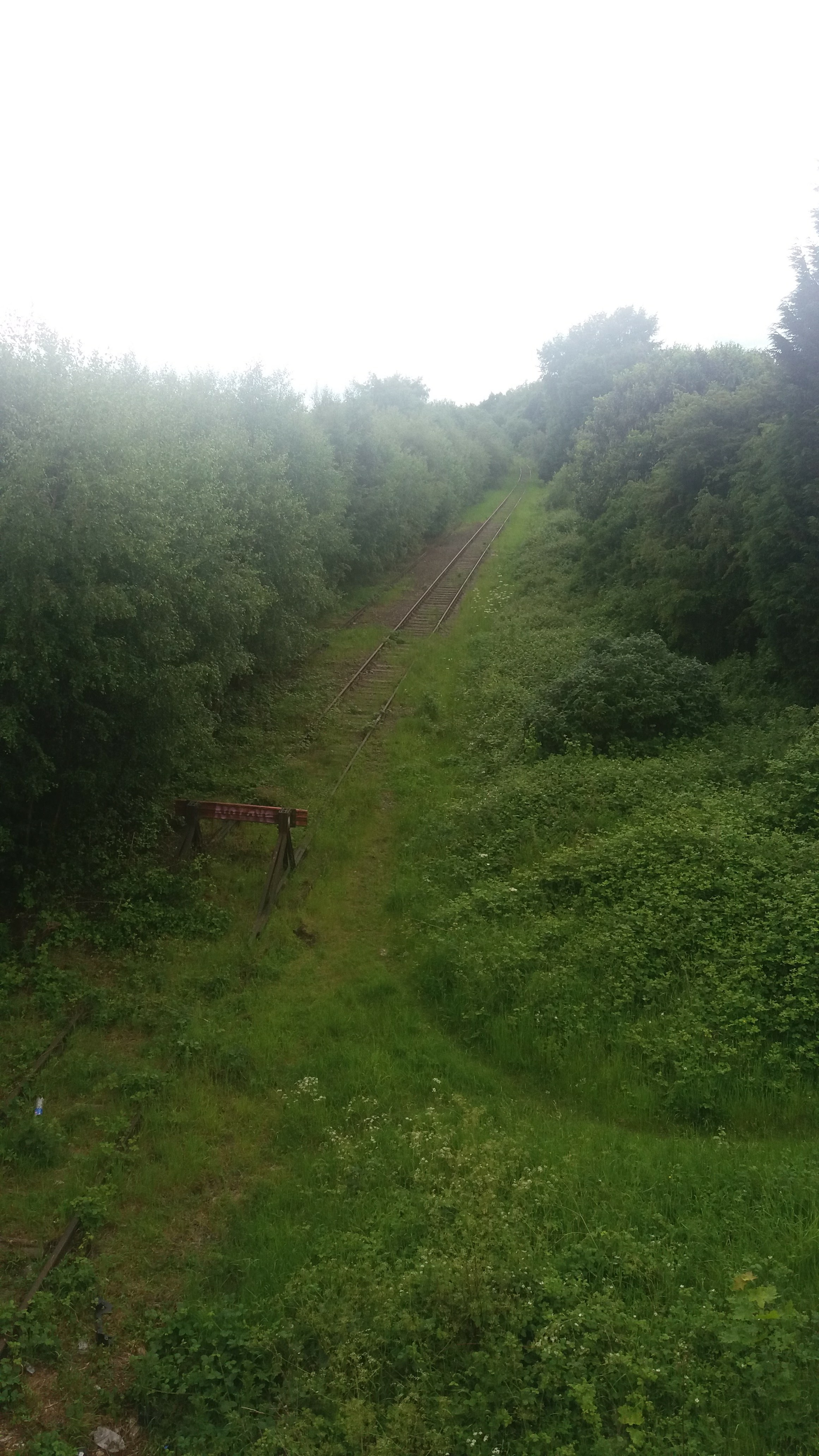
- The abandoned site of Harts Hill station; it will serve as a junction for the metro extension and freight traffic

General information
- Location: Woodside, Metropolitan Borough of Dudley; England
- Coordinates: 52.4947°N 2.1061°W
- Grid reference: SO928885
- Platforms: 2

Other information
- Status: Disused

History
- Original company: Great Western Railway
- Pre-grouping: Great Western Railway

Key dates
- 1895: Opened
- 1 January 1917: Closed
Location

Harts Hill railway station served the Woodside and Holly Hall areas of Dudley, in the West Midlands (historically Worcestershire and later Staffordshire), England. It was on the Oxford-Worcester-Wolverhampton Line.

== History ==
The station was opened in 1895 by the Great Western Railway, which was keen to invest in what was perceived to be the lucrative passenger area of the Black Country. It was intended to serve the communities between Brierley Hill and Dudley.

Two railways/routes served the station: originally the Oxford, Worcester and Wolverhampton Railway and the South Staffordshire Railway, which later became the Great Western Railway and London, Midland and Scottish Railway (through amalgamation of the London and North Western Railway) respectively.

It closed, like many passenger stations, in 1917 due to the First World War, but was consequently never reopened when passenger numbers failed to materialise.

Preceding station	Disused railways	Following station
Blowers Green	Oxford, Worcester and Wolverhampton Railway; Later Great Western Railway, then British Rail; Oxford-Worcester-Wolverhampton (1852-1962)	Round Oak
Blowers Green	South Staffordshire Railway; Later LNWR, then LMS, finally BR; South Staffs Line Dudley-Stourbridge Junction section (1852-1962)	Round Oak

== The site today ==
There are no remaining signs of the station. The road from which it was accessed has long since been widened to create a dual carriageway.

== Midland Metro ==
A £1.1 billion, 15 year-long regeneration project will see the station become part of the local tram network with the line reopening between Walsall, Dudley Port, Dudley and the Merry Hill Shopping Centre for trams on one track and for freight on the other. Freight trains would continue on past Brettell Lane and onto the main line at Stourbridge Junction.
