= Baptist End railway station =

Disused railway station in Netherton, West Midlands

Baptist End
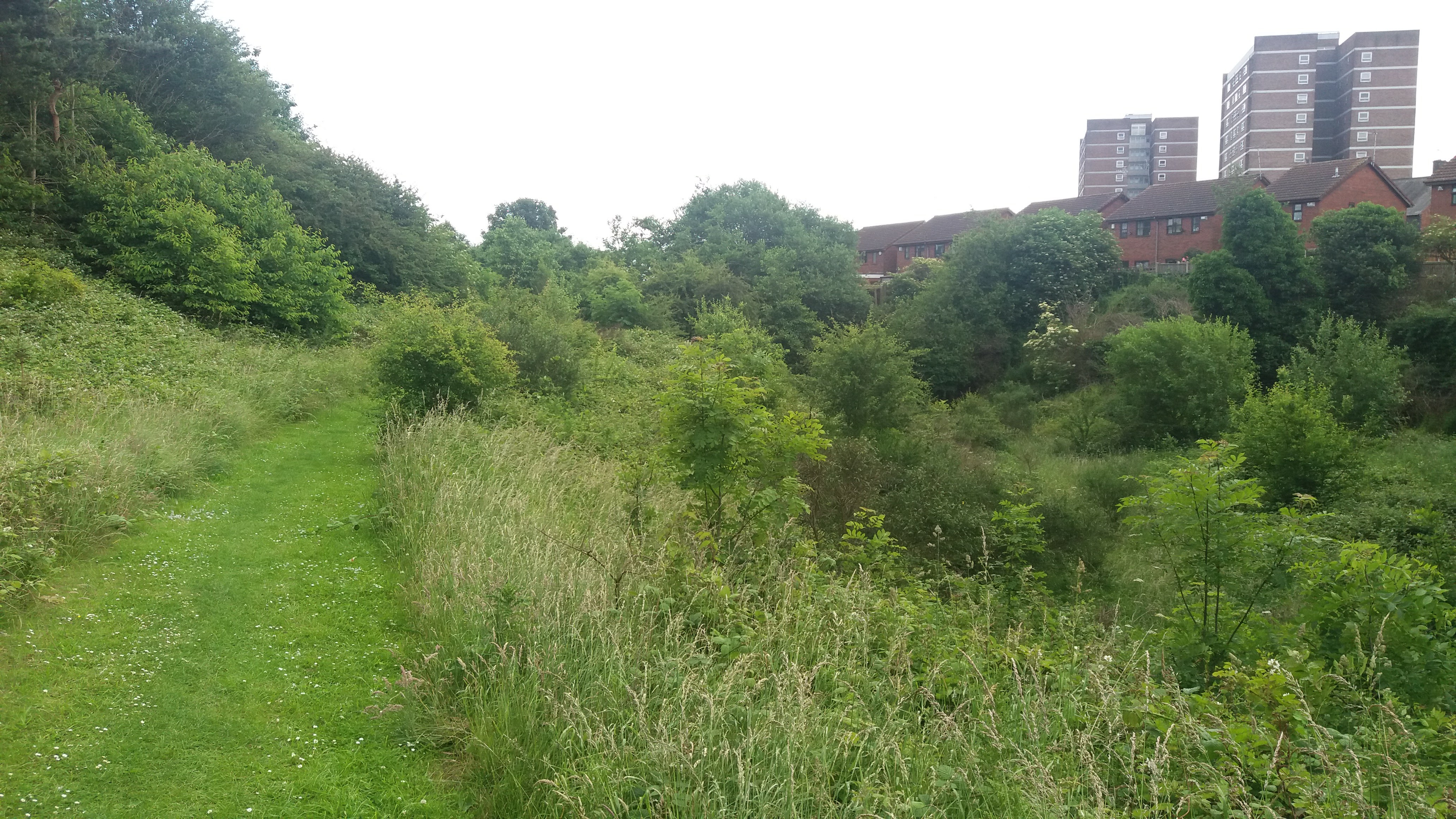
- Station site in 2017

General information
- Location: Netherton, Dudley; England
- Coordinates: 52.4968°N 2.0826°W
- Grid reference: SO944887
- Platforms: 2

Other information
- Status: Disused

History
- Original company: Great Western Railway
- Pre-grouping: Great Western Railway
- Post-grouping: Great Western Railway

Key dates
- 21 August 1905: Opened
- 15 June 1964: Closed
Location

Baptist End railway station was a halt on the former Great Western Railway's Bumble Hole Line between Blowers Green and Old Hill.

The station opened in 1905 on the existing line which had opened in 1878. It was rebuilt and much improved in 1958 before closing in 1964, as part of the Beeching Axe. The railway which passed through the site had closed completely within four years of the station's closure, and the track was removed soon afterwards. Nature has since reclaimed the section of the railway which passed through the site of the station.

Preceding station	Disused railways	Following station
Blowers Green	Great Western Railway; Later British Rail; Bumble Hole Line (1878-1964)	Windmill End
