= Brighton Road =

Brighton Road may refer to:

- A23 road, England
- Brighton Road, Adelaide
- Brighton Road railway station, England
