= Woodside, Dudley =

Coordinates: 52.493°N 2.114°W

Woodside
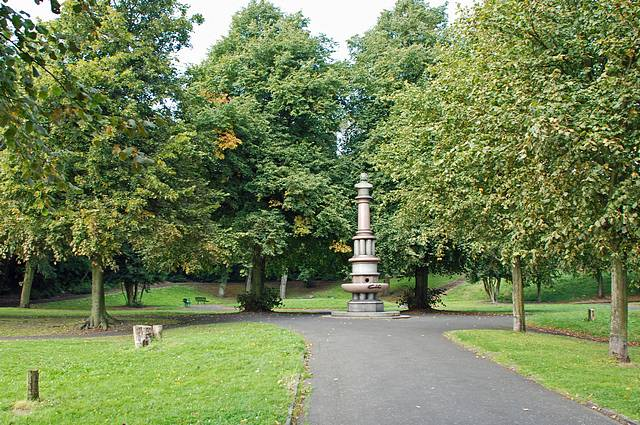
- Woodside Park

- Location within the West Midlands
- OS grid reference: SO923883
- Metropolitan borough: Dudley
- Metropolitan county: West Midlands
- Region: West Midlands
- Country: England
- Sovereign state: United Kingdom
- Post town: DUDLEY
- Postcode district: DY2
- Post town: BRIERLEY HILL
- Postcode district: DY5
- Dialling code: 01384
- Police: West Midlands
- Fire: West Midlands
- Ambulance: West Midlands
- UK Parliament: Dudley South

Woodside is a residential area of Dudley in the West Midlands of England.

== History ==
It was originally a separate manor from Dudley in a once rural area south-west of the town in the direction of Brierley Hill, but development along the main Dudley to Stourbridge towards the end of the 19th century saw it merged into Dudley County Borough. In 1890, the Earl of Dudley gave land for the establishment of Woodside Park and building Woodside Library. The Library was opened in 1896 and closed in 2008.

It grew substantially after World War I, with significant private housing developments taking place along Stourbridge Road, as well as council housing in the 1920s and 1930s to rehouse families from slums. These including 220 "Homes for Heroes" which were built in the mid-1920s when council housing development in Dudley was in its early stages.

Since the mid-1980s, the main roads around Woodside have been plagued with congestion due to its close proximity to the Merry Hill Shopping Centre, and the fact that the centre's road links are very much the same to how they existed at the time of its opening.

Woodside was also the location of the Cochrane and Co. Ironworks and Foundry, which was responsible for much of the ironwork used in the construction of The Crystal Palace created for the Great Exhibition of 1851, as well as the production of the early Penfold-design pillar boxes.

=== Railway ===
Harts Hill railway station, on the South Staffordshire line and the Oxford, Worcester and Wolverhampton Railway, opened in 1852, but closed to passengers in 1916 due to World War I and never reopened. The South Staffordshire line remained open to freight traffic until 1993.

== Notable people ==
The footballer William Ball was born at Woodside in 1886.

Duncan Edwards, who played for Manchester United and England, and died in the Munich air disaster of 1958, was born in a house on Malvern Crescent on 1 October 1936, but grew up two miles away on the Priory Estate.
