= Round Oak railway station =

Former railway station in the West Midlands, England

Round Oak

General information
- Location: Brierley Hill; Metropolitan Borough of Dudley; England
- Coordinates: 52.4886°N 2.1206°W
- Grid reference: SO919878

Other information
- Status: Disused

History
- Original company: Oxford, Worcester and Wolverhampton Railway
- Pre-grouping: Great Western Railway
- Post-grouping: Great Western Railway

Key dates
- 1852: Opened
- 1962: Closed
Location

Round Oak railway station served the town of Brierley Hill, in the West Midlands (historically Staffordshire), England. It was a stop on the Oxford-Worcester-Wolverhampton Line.

== History ==
The station was opened in 1852. Two railways served it: originally the Oxford, Worcester and Wolverhampton Railway and the South Staffordshire Railway, which later became the Great Western Railway and London, Midland and Scottish Railway (through amalgamation of the London and North Western Railway) respectively.

| Preceding station | Disused railways | Following station |
|---|---|---|
| Harts Hill | Oxford, Worcester and Wolverhampton Railway; Later Great Western Railway, then British Rail; Oxford-Worcester-Wolverhampton (1852-1962) | Brierley Hill |
| Harts Hill | South Staffordshire Railway; Later LNWR, then LMS, finally BR; South Staffs Line Dudley-Stourbridge Junction section (1852-1962) | Brierley Hill |

=== Accident ===
In 1858, a coupling broke on an excursion train at the station and the rear portion rolled back down the gradient from Round Oak station towards Brettell Lane. It collided with another train, which was part of the same excursion; the train had already been safely divided once, due to its extreme length. 14 passengers were killed and 50 more were injured.

== Closure ==
British Railways closed the station pre-Beeching in 1962 and plans for freight use were abandoned at the same time.

== The site today ==
Goods trains continue to pass the site, for a few hundred yards northwards, to Round Oak Steel Terminal.

== West Midlands Metro ==
A £1.1 billion, 15-year-long regeneration project will see the station become part of the local tram network with the line reopening between Walsall, Dudley Port, Dudley and the Merry Hill Shopping Centre for trams on one track and for freight on the other. Freight trains would continue on past Brettell Lane and onto the main line at Stourbridge Junction.

It was originally set to reopen as a through route in 2012, to run alongside the second phase of the Midland Metro; it is expected that trams will diverge from the line at around the location of Harts Hill. Due to open originally in a revised date of 2023, cost overruns have seen work put back with a currently planned opening date of 2025. However, as of July 2023, no funding of the section between Brierley Hill and the Merry Hill Centre has been made available.
