= Princes End and Coseley railway station =

Railway station in Princes End, Sandwell, England from 1853 to 1962

Princes End and Coseley

General information
- Location: Princes End, Sandwell; England
- Coordinates: 52.5413°N 2.0729°W
- Grid reference: SO951937
- Platforms: 2

Other information
- Status: Disused

History
- Original company: Oxford, Worcester and Wolverhampton Railway
- Pre-grouping: Great Western Railway
- Post-grouping: Great Western Railway

Key dates
- 1853: Opened as Princes End
- 1936: Renamed as Princes End & Coseley
- 1962: Closed
Location

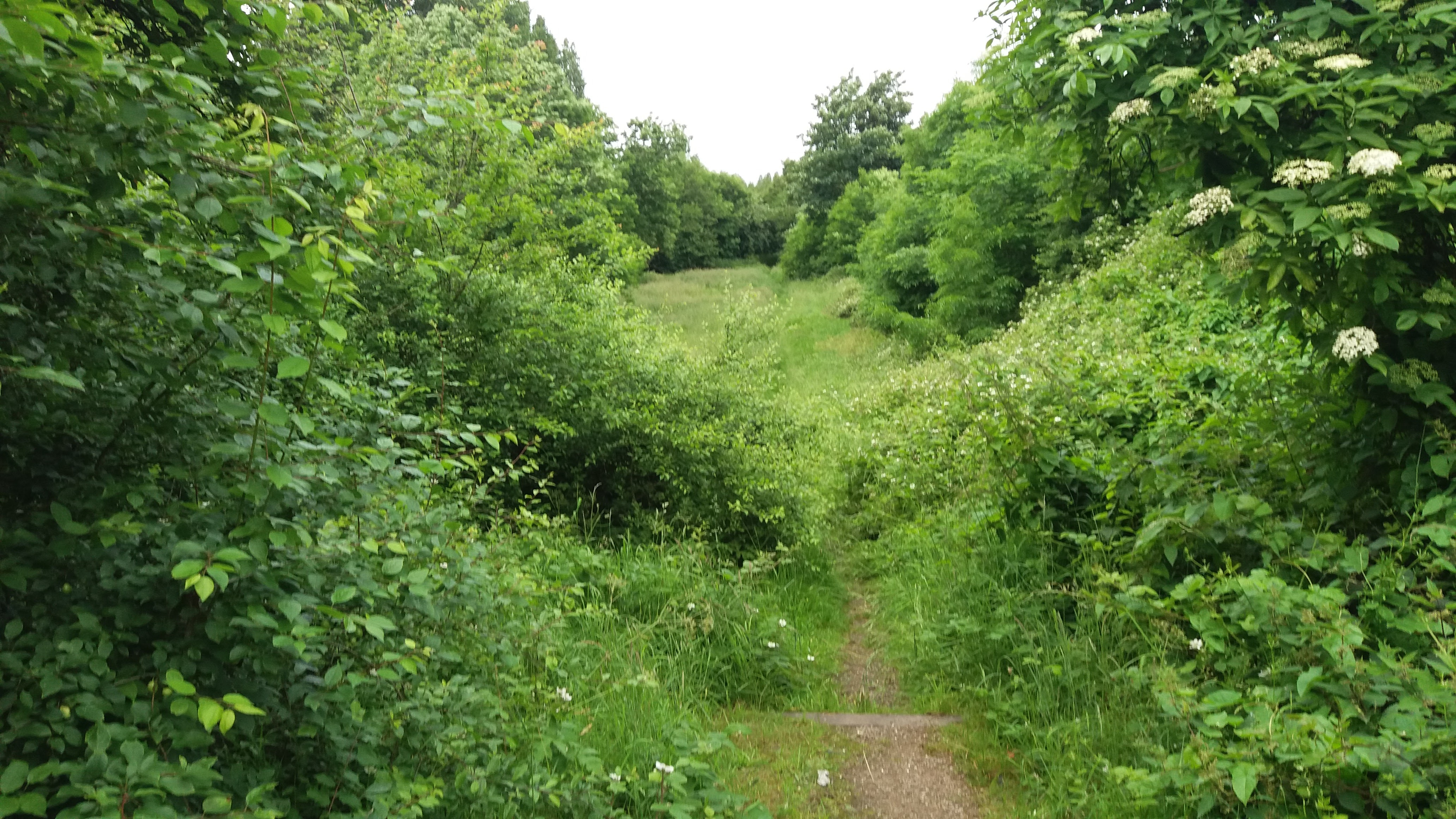
Princes End and Coseley station site, now a public footpath

Princes End and Coseley railway station was a station built by the Oxford, Worcester and Wolverhampton Railway in 1853. It was one of two stations in Princes End, but was situated closer to Coseley, which influenced the decision in 1936 to add the 'and Coseley' tag on the end of the station name. It was situated on the Oxford-Worcester-Wolverhampton Line. The station eventually closed in 1962, along with the passenger services along the line, although the line remained open to goods trains until 22 September 1968.

The site of the station is now a small nature walk. The other side towards Tipton Five Ways has been filled in and is now mostly occupied by housing and industrial outlets.

Preceding station	Disused railways	Following station
Daisy Bank	Oxford, Worcester and Wolverhampton Railway; Later Great Western Railway, then British Rail; Oxford-Worcester-Wolverhampton (1852-1962)	Tipton Five Ways
