= Tipton Five Ways railway station =

Former railway station in Tipton, England

Tipton Five Ways
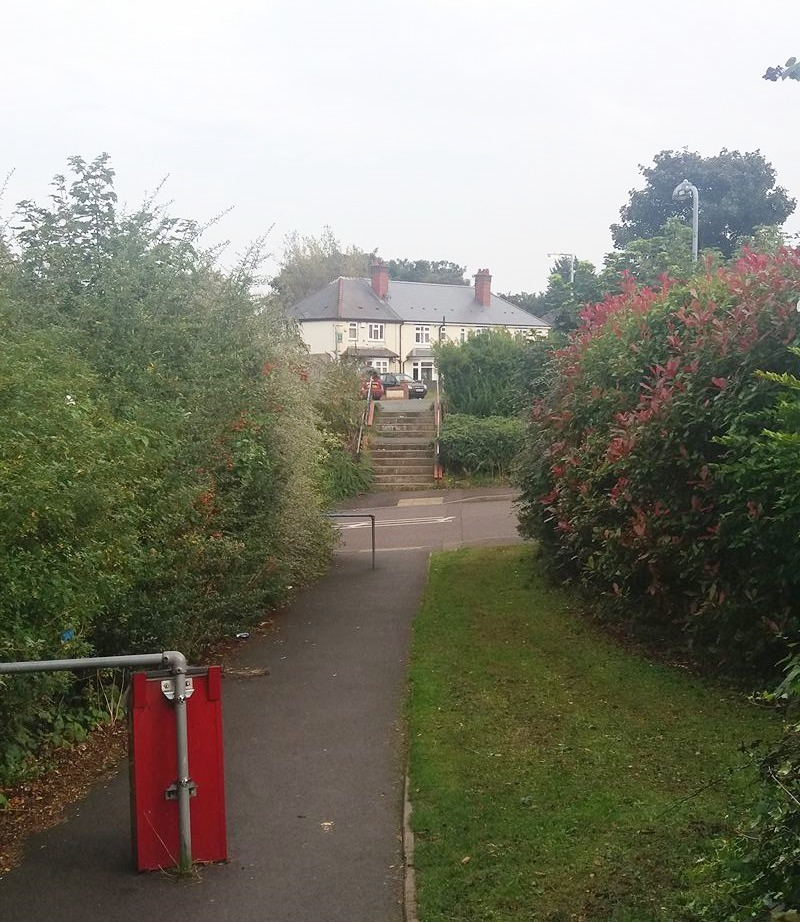
- Tipton Five Ways station site in 2017

General information
- Location: Tipton, Sandwell; England
- Coordinates: 52.5294°N 2.0791°W
- Grid reference: SO947923
- Platforms: 2

Other information
- Status: Disused

History
- Original company: Oxford, Worcester and Wolverhampton Railway
- Pre-grouping: Great Western Railway
- Post-grouping: Great Western Railway

Key dates
- 1853: Opened as Tipton
- 1950: Renamed as Tipton Five Ways
- 1962: Closed
Location

Tipton Five Ways railway station was a station built by the Oxford, Worcester and Wolverhampton Railway, serving the town of Tipton in the western section near the border with Coseley for 88 years from 1853.

The 'Five Ways' tag was only added in 1950 – to avoid confusion with Tipton Owen Street. It was situated on the Oxford-Worcester-Wolverhampton Line. The station eventually closed in 1962, though the line remained open until 22 September 1968. The station buildings were demolished soon after closure.

The station site was developed in 2001–02 with new housing, which made use of most of the track bed between Sedgley Road West and Birmingham New Road. The overbridges at both ends of this section of the railway were demolished at this time.

Preceding station	Disused railways	Following station
Princes End and Coseley	Oxford, Worcester and Wolverhampton Railway; Later Great Western Railway, then British Rail; Oxford-Worcester-Wolverhampton (1852–1962)	Dudley
