= Camp Hill railway station =

Disused railway station in England

Camp Hill
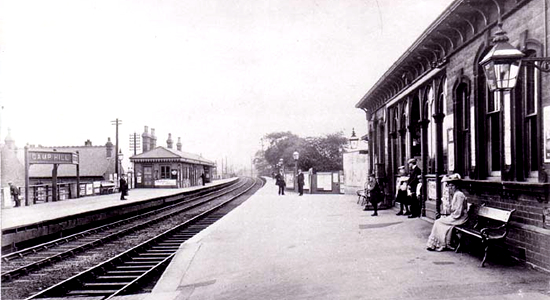
- Camp Hill railway station, date unknown

General information
- Location: Camp Hill, Birmingham; England
- Coordinates: 52.4620°N 1.8832°W
- Grid reference: SP080849
- Platforms: 2

Other information
- Status: Disused

History
- Original company: Birmingham and Gloucester Railway
- Pre-grouping: Midland Railway
- Post-grouping: London, Midland and Scottish Railway

Key dates
- 17 December 1840: First station opened
- 17 August 1841: Passenger services ceased but remained open for goods trains
- 15 November 1841: Second passenger station opened
- 1 December 1867: Renamed Camp Hill and Balsall Heath
- 1 April 1904: Renamed Camp Hill
- 27 January 1941: Closed
Location

Camp Hill railway station was the name of a series of successive railway stations in Camp Hill, Birmingham on the Birmingham and Gloucester Railway.

== History ==
The first station at Camp Hill, then near the outskirts of Birmingham, was opened as Birmingham Camp Hill in 1840 by the B&GR to serve as their temporary northern terminus.

After an agreement was reached with the London and Birmingham Railway, the line was extended to terminate at the latter's centrally located Birmingham terminus. Services switched termini on 17 August 1841, and the station was closed to passengers. As goods traffic had started operating on the line from April that year, the site of the B&GR terminus at Camp Hill was converted into a goods terminus. Now located on a short spur, it was renamed Camp Hill Goods. A short time later on 15 November 1841 a newly-constructed passenger station was opened just south of the spur, also named Camp Hill.

From 1867 to 1904, it was known as Camp Hill and Balsall Heath. The name of the station reverted to Camp Hill in 1904.

Because of the necessity for a reversal at New Street (which replaced Curzon Street as the northern terminus in 1854), many trains on the Midland Railway line from Derby continued to use Camp Hill until New Street was extended in 1885 and connected to the Birmingham West Suburban Railway (BWSR). This also resulted in the stretch from Kings Norton to Camp Hill becoming a branch line, being renamed the Camp Hill line after its eponymous former terminus.

The station and line closed to passenger traffic on 27 January 1941. Camp Hill Goods station continued operating until the 1960s. It has since been turned into an industrial estate.

== Incidents ==
On 26 June 1845, a B&GR passenger train from Gloucester, hauled by one of the company's Philadelphia, United States-built engines, ran into a slow-moving "heavy, powerful" goods engine which was crossing the line from a siding, via a diamond crossing, at Camp Hill. The driver of the Gloucester train was badly hurt after jumping from his engine. Some passengers suffered minor injuries, mostly from flying glass. Both engines suffered only minor damage. The driver of the goods engine was deemed at fault, but was discharged by magistrates on the grounds of previous good character. For the same reason the company demoted him to non-driving duties, rather than dismissing him.

Preceding station	Disused railways	Following station
Moseley	Birmingham and Gloucester Railway	Birmingham
Moseley	Birmingham and Gloucester Railway	Camp Hill Goods
Brighton Road	Midland Railway; Camp Hill line	Birmingham New Street
Brighton Road	Midland Railway; Camp Hill line	Camp Hill Goods
