= Daisy Bank railway station =

Former railway station in England

Daisy Bank
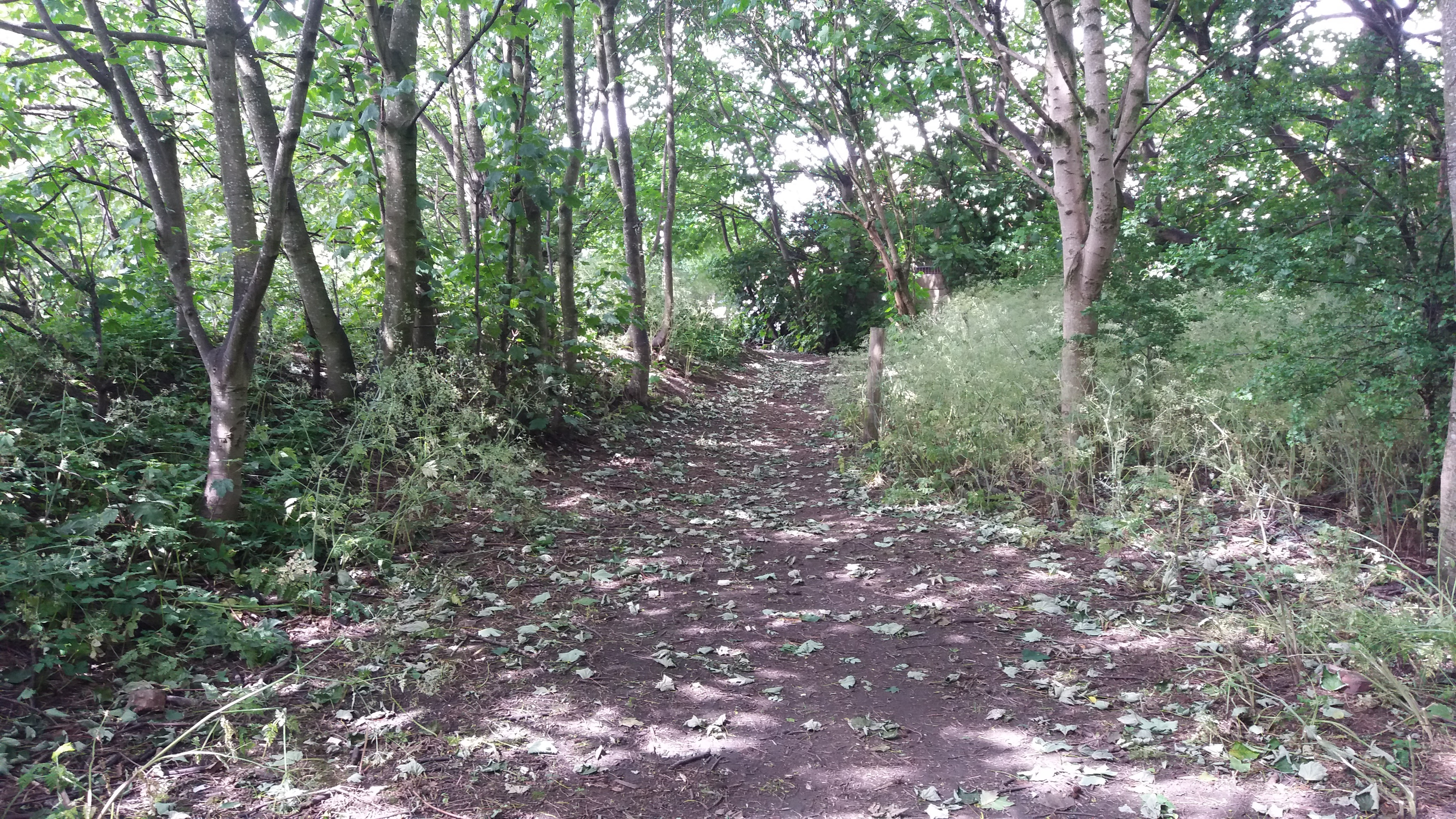
- Daisy Bank station site

General information
- Location: Bradley, Wolverhampton; England
- Coordinates: 52.5529°N 2.0752°W
- Grid reference: SO950950
- Platforms: 2

Other information
- Status: Disused

History
- Original company: Oxford, Worcester and Wolverhampton Railway
- Pre-grouping: Great Western Railway
- Post-grouping: Great Western Railway

Key dates
- 1854: Opened as Daisy Bank & Bradley
- 1 January 1917: Closed
- 3 February 1919: Reopened
- 1962: Closed
Location

Daisy Bank railway station was a station built by the Oxford, Worcester and Wolverhampton Railway in 1854 as Daisy Bank & Bradley station. It was situated on the Oxford-Worcester-Wolverhampton Line. The station closed in 1917 as a wartime economy measure before reopening in 1919, and closed permanently in 1962, though goods trains continued to pass through the site until the line closed completely on 22 September 1968.

The cutting from the station site has since been filled in and is now a nature walk with the other side of the line still being in situ as a footpath until a large shrub has been placed to block off the trackbed towards Bilston West.

Preceding station	Disused railways	Following station
Bilston West	Oxford, Worcester and Wolverhampton Railway; Later Great Western Railway, then British Rail; Oxford-Worcester-Wolverhampton (1852-1962)	Princes End and Coseley
