= Bilston West railway station =

Disused railway station in Bilston, Wolverhampton

Bilston West
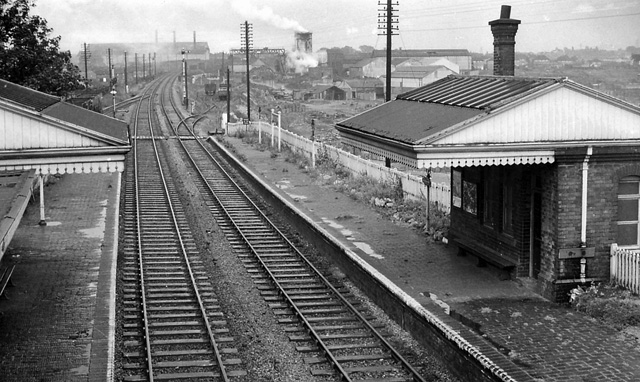
- A few weeks after closure

General information
- Location: Bilston, Wolverhampton; England
- Coordinates: 52.5612°N 2.0825°W
- Grid reference: SO945959
- Platforms: 2

Other information
- Status: Disused

History
- Original company: Oxford, Worcester and Wolverhampton Railway
- Pre-grouping: Great Western Railway
- Post-grouping: Great Western Railway

Key dates
- 1 July 1854: Opened as Bilston
- 19 July 1950: Renamed Bilston West
- 30 July 1962: Closed
Location

Bilston West railway station was a station built by the Oxford, Worcester and Wolverhampton Railway in 1854. It was situated on the Oxford-Worcester-Wolverhampton Line. The station eventually closed in 1962.

The station site has since disappeared under industrial and redevelopment as the Black Country Route and commercial premises have since been built on the former trackbed towards Priestfield although the trackbed can still be seen on an embankment before disappearing.

Preceding station	Disused railways	Following station
Priestfield	Oxford, Worcester and Wolverhampton Railway; Later Great Western Railway, then British Railways; Oxford-Worcester-Wolverhampton (1852–1962)	Daisy Bank
