= Blowers Green railway station =

Disused railway station in the West Midlands

Blowers Green
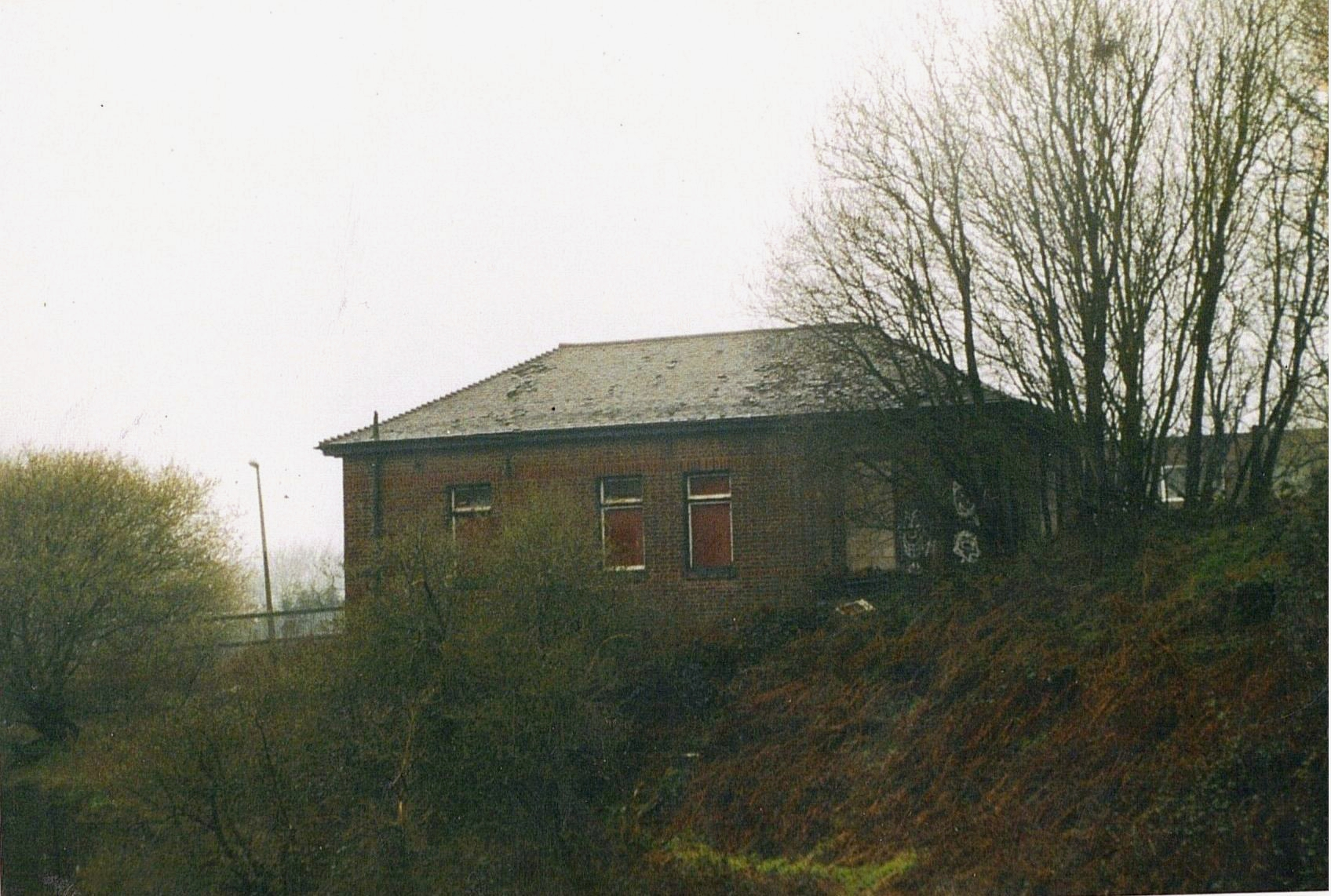
- The station building in 2004

General information
- Location: Netherton, Metropolitan Borough of Dudley; England
- Coordinates: 52.5042°N 2.0844°W
- Grid reference: SO944896
- Platforms: 2

Other information
- Status: Disused

History
- Original company: Oxford, Worcester and Wolverhampton Railway
- Pre-grouping: Great Western Railway
- Post-grouping: Great Western Railway

Key dates
- 1 March 1878: Opened as Netherton
- 1878: Renamed Dudley Southside and Netherton
- 1 August 1921: Renamed Blowers Green
- 30 July 1962: Closed to passengers
- 1965: Closed as an emergency escape point
Location

Blowers Green railway station was a stop on the Oxford-Worcester-Wolverhampton Line in the town of Netherton, West Midlands (historically Worcestershire and later Staffordshire), England.

== History ==
It was opened in 1878 by the Great Western Railway to serve the growing communities of Woodside and Netherton. Soon after opening, it was renamed Dudley Southside & Netherton. It was opened immediately north of Netherton station which it replaced.

Three railways served the station: originally the Oxford, Worcester and Wolverhampton Railway, the South Staffordshire Railway (which later became the Great Western Railway) and London, Midland and Scottish Railway (through amalgamation of the London and North Western Railway). There were also services from Dudley to Old Hill along this route as part of GWR's service. The junction to Old Hill diverged between here and Harts Hill.

The line had reasonable passenger usage until about the early 1880s, when it began to slump at several stations; this led to the line becoming a largely freight only operation in 1887. It would remain open for goods traffic, which was considerable at this time, as the district had become highly industrialised in the then heyday of the Black Country's industrial past.

The station was renamed Blowers Green in 1921.

The growing popularity of motor vehicles during the 20th century meant that the station's usage was in decline by the 1950s and its future was under threat.

British Railways closed the station to passengers in 1962, although trains from Dudley to Old Hill passed through the station until 1964. It remained as an emergency escape point and access point for railway engineers until late 1965.

Preceding station	Disused railways	Following station
Dudley	Great Western Railway; Later British Rail; Bumble Hole Line (1878-1964)	Baptist End
Dudley	Oxford, Worcester and Wolverhampton Railway; Later Great Western Railway, then British Rail; Oxford-Worcester-Wolverhampton (1852-1962)	Harts Hill
Dudley	South Staffordshire Railway; Later LNWR, then LMS, finally BR; South Staffs Line Dudley-Stourbridge Junction section (1852-1962)	Harts Hill

== The site today ==
Despite being disused for more than 50 years, the station building survives, but was bricked up around the year 2000. The forecourt has been fenced off since 2004 due to youths' anti-social behaviour, structural decay and periodical use by homeless people. Bill-posters are stuck to it from time to time.

== Midland Metro development ==
A £1.1 billion, 15 year-long regeneration project will see the station become part of the local tram network with the line reopening between Walsall, Dudley Port, Dudley and the Merry Hill Shopping Centre for trams on one track and for freight on the other. Freight trains would continue on past Brettell Lane and onto the main line at Stourbridge Junction.

It was originally set to reopen as a through route in 2012, to run alongside the second phase of the Midland Metro; it is expected that trams will diverge from the line at around the location of Harts Hill. Due to open originally in a revised date of 2023, cost overruns have seen work put back with a currently planned opening date of 2025. However, as of July 2023, no funding of the section between Brierley Hill and the Merry Hill Centre has been made available.

== Gallery ==
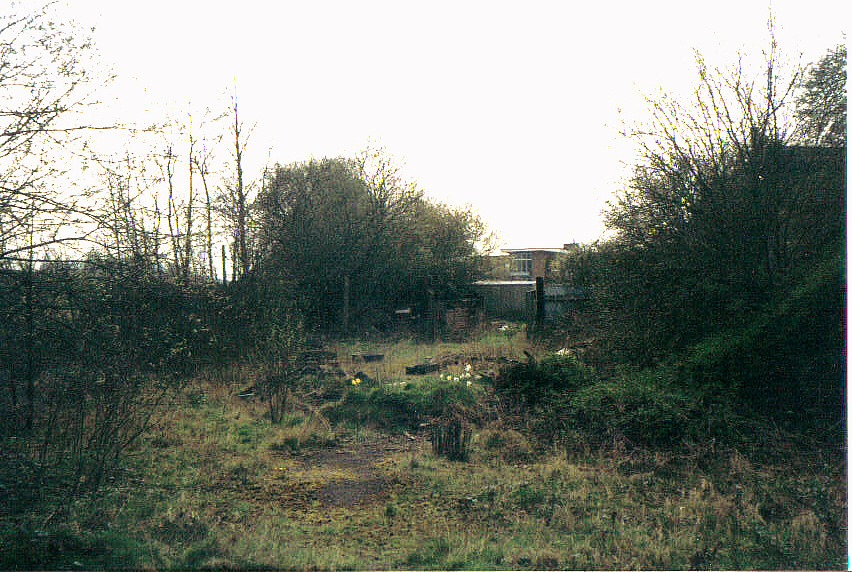
The station forecourt in 2002; this area has been fenced off since 2004.

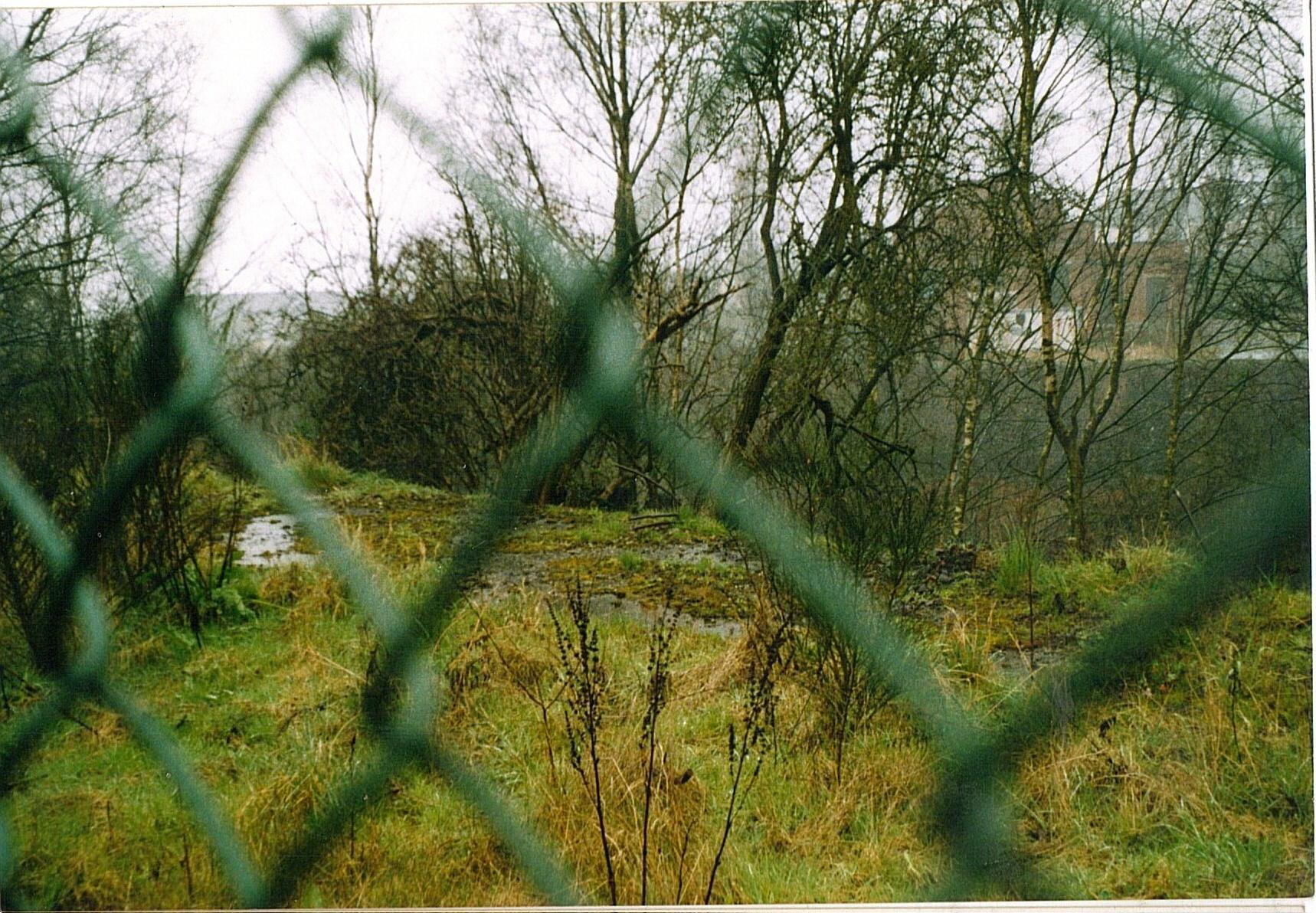
Netherton signal box in 2004.

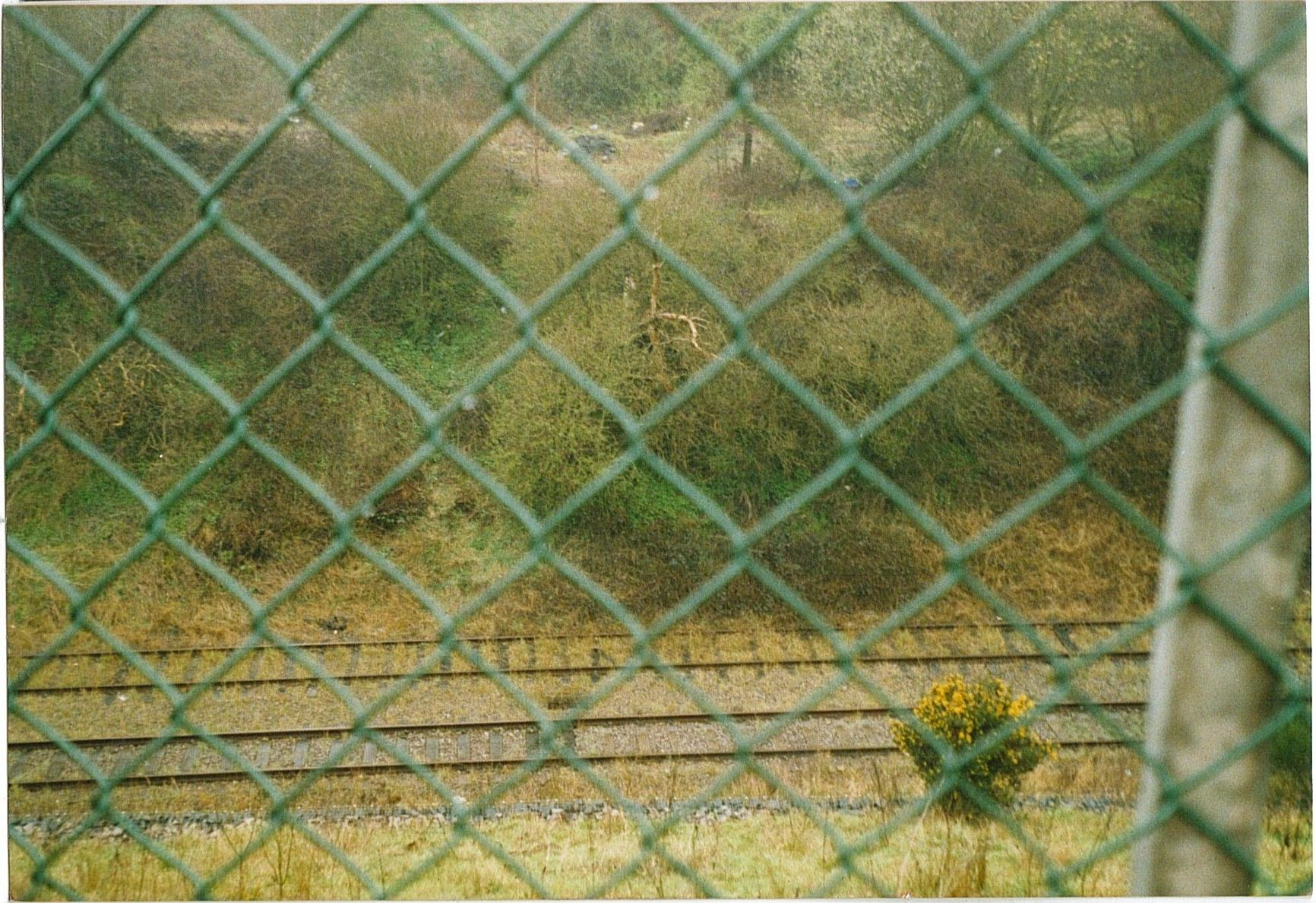
The line below Netherton signal box and the station building in 2004.
