= Brighton Road railway station =

Disused railway station in England

Brighton Road

General information
- Location: Balsall Heath, Birmingham; England
- Coordinates: 52.4554°N 1.8835°W
- Grid reference: SP080841

Other information
- Status: Disused

History
- Original company: Midland Railway
- Pre-grouping: Midland Railway
- Post-grouping: London, Midland and Scottish Railway

Key dates
- 1 November 1875: Opened
- 27 January 1941: Closed
Location

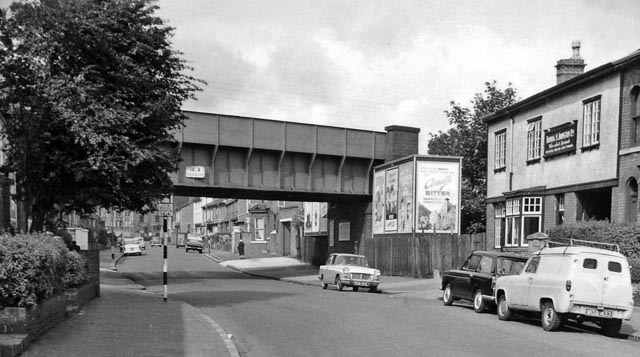
Site of Brighton Road Station, Birmingham

Brighton Road railway station is a former railway station in Balsall Heath, Birmingham. It was originally opened in 1875 before being closed to passengers in 1941.

== History ==
The station was built on the Midland Railway operated former Birmingham and Gloucester Railway main line (now the Camp Hill line) near the border of Balsall Heath and Moseley in 1875. John Bagwell was appointed station master in 1876 and he held this position until the station was placed under the supervision of the Camp Hill station master on 15 July 1907.

The station finally closed to passengers on 27 January 1941 due to Second World War economy measures, along with the other passenger stations on the Camp Hill line.

== Planned reopening ==
Since the late 2000s, proposals have been made to re-open the station, along with others on the Camp Hill line, for passenger use.

In July 2017, it was proposed that the station could reopen as part of the plans to reopen the line through the site for passengers after the new metro mayor revised plans for the reopening of the line with a stop in Balsall Heath as well as those at Moseley, Kings Heath, and Hazelwell.

In 2019, the project to reopen the Camp Hill line stations received £15 million in Government funding, with construction due to start in 2020 and aimed for completion in time for the 2022 Commonwealth Games. This was delayed by the coronavirus pandemic, and in March 2021 it was announced that additional funding had been found for the project. Though Moseley Village (formerly "Moseley"), Kings Heath, and Pineapple Road (formerly "Hazelwell") stations reopened on 7 April 2026, plans for a station in Balsall Heath did not materialise.

In February 2023 it was announced that funding had been allocated to begin investigating opening a station in Balsall Heath, though any construction would rely on the building of the Bordesley Chords. It is not currently known if the station would be located at the site of the former Brighton Road station, the site of the former Camp Hill station, or at a new site between the two. It has been suggested that any station would be named Balsall Heath.

Preceding station	Disused railways	Following station
Moseley	Midland Railway; Camp Hill line	Camp Hill
