= Old Hill railway station =

Railway station in the West Midlands, England

Coordinates: 52.471°N 2.056°W

Old Hill
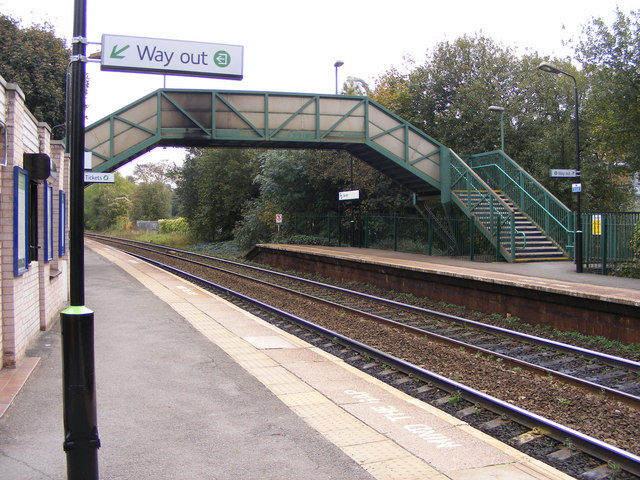

General information
- Location: Old Hill, Sandwell; England
- Grid reference: SO962858
- Manager: West Midlands Trains
- Transit authority: Transport for West Midlands
- Platforms: 2

Other information
- Station code: OHL
- Fare zone: 4
- Classification: DfT category E

History
- Opened: 1866

Passengers
- 2021/22: ▲97,864
- 2022/23: ▲0.108 million
- 2023/24: ▲0.135 million
- 2024/25: ▲0.154 million
- 2025/26: ▲0.184 million
Location
Notes
- Passenger statistics from the Office of Rail and Road

Old Hill railway station is in Old Hill, West Midlands, England, on the Birmingham-Stourbridge line. It is managed by West Midlands Trains, who provide the majority of train services; Chiltern Railways also operate a small number.

== History ==
The station, which opened in 1866, was historically part of the Great Western Railway, and was at the junction of the line from Birmingham to Stourbridge Junction with lines to Dudley and via Halesowen to Longbridge. The two latter lines have long since been closed. The original station buildings have also been removed.

Because it was a junction station, the platforms were staggered, with the Birmingham-bound platform offset by a short distance.

A further junction in the Stourbridge direction allowed trains to traverse the Bumble Hole Line, which ran to Dudley. That line closed in 1964.

Preceding station	Disused railways	Following station
Old Hill High Street; Line and station closed	Great Western Railway; Bumble Hole Line	Terminus
Terminus	Great Western Railway and Midland Railway; Halesowen Railway	Coombes Holloway Halt; Line and station closed

To the east of the current station were private railway sidings serving Palmer Timber's Yard, which have long been removed.

The original timber station buildings were badly damaged by fire on 13 September 1967, and that prompted the modernisation of station, with the new building opening on 22 May 1968. The station footbridge was moved to different location from that of the original one, which was towards the Stourbridge end of the platform.

With rationalising of signalling, the signal box that served Old Hill was demolished in 1973.

== Services ==
The typical Monday-Saturday daytime service is every 30 minutes, westbound to Worcester Foregate Street via Birmingham Snow Hill and eastbound to Dorridge and Stratford-upon-Avon. During the evenings, services run alternately via Whitlocks End and via Dorridge, with some services running to Worcester Shrub Hill.

On Sundays, trains are hourly between Stourbridge Junction and Dorridge.

Chiltern Railways only operate one service per weekday from this station, the 21:02 London Marylebone to Stourbridge Junction, which departs from Old Hill at 23:38 on Mondays to Fridays only.

Preceding station	National Rail	Following station
Rowley Regis	West Midlands Railway Birmingham to Worcester via Kidderminster line	Cradley Heath
Rowley Regis	Chiltern Railways London–Birmingham–Stourbridge; Mondays to Fridays only	Cradley Heath
