= Brettell Lane railway station =

Former railway station in the West Midlands, England

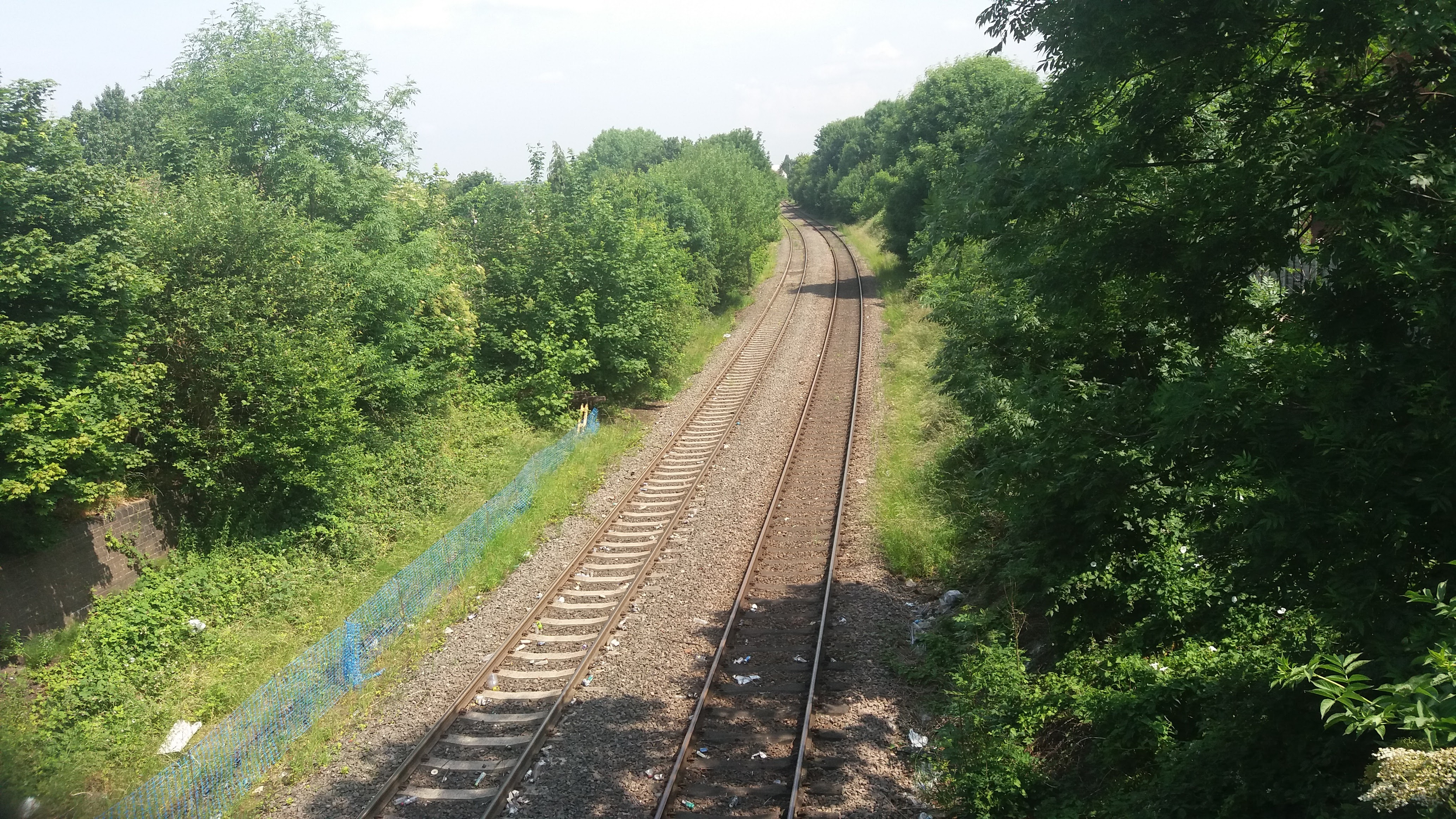
- The station site; the line is still in use for freight traffic

General information
- Location: Brierley Hill; Dudley; England
- Coordinates: 52.4740°N 2.1369°W
- Grid reference: SO908862
- Platforms: 2

Other information
- Status: Disused

History
- Original company: Oxford, Worcester and Wolverhampton Railway
- Pre-grouping: Great Western Railway
- Post-grouping: Great Western Railway

Key dates
- 1852: Opened
- 1962: Closed
Location

Brettell Lane railway station served the town of Brierley Hill, in the West Midlands, England. It was a stop on the Oxford-Worcester-Wolverhampton Line.

== History ==
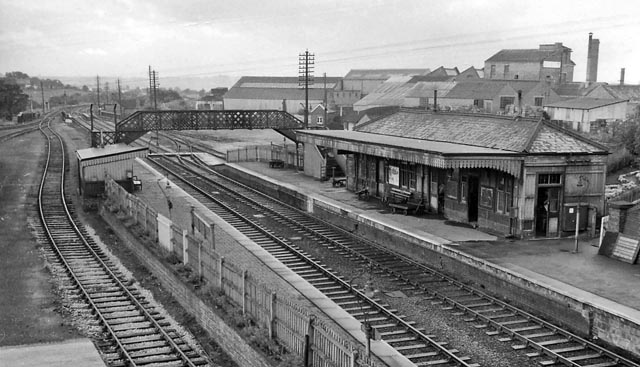
View southward in 1962

The station was opened in 1852 by the Oxford, Worcester and Wolverhampton Railway. Local coal mining and steel mills led to rapid industrialisation of the area and heavy usage of the station in the early 20th century, but passenger numbers had declined badly by the 1960s.

The line had reasonable passenger usage until about the early 1880s, when it began to slump at several stations, leading to the line becoming a largely freight only operation in 1887. It would remain open for goods traffic, which was considerable at this time, as the district had become highly industrialised in the then heyday of the Black Country's industrial past.

As the local industry declined and road transport became more common, the station entered a post-World War II decline.

Preceding station	Disused railways	Following station
Brockmoor Halt	Great Western Railway "The Wombourne Branch" (1925-1932)	Stourbridge Junction
Brierley Hill	Oxford, Worcester and Wolverhampton Railway; Later Great Western Railway, then British Rail; Oxford-Worcester-Wolverhampton (1852-1962)	Stourbridge Junction
Brierley Hill	South Staffordshire Railway; Later LNWR, then LMS, finally BR; South Staffs Line Dudley-Stourbridge Junction section (1852-1964)	Stourbridge Junction

=== Accident ===
In 1858, a coupling broke on an excursion train at the station and the rear portion rolled back down the gradient from Round Oak towards Brettell Lane. It collided with another train, which was part of the same excursion; the train had already been safely divided once, due to its extreme length. 14 passengers were killed and 50 more were injured.

=== Closure ===
British Railways closed the station pre-Beeching in 1962.

Two railways/routes served the station - originally the OW&WR and the South Staffordshire Railway, which later became the Great Western Railway and London, Midland and Scottish Railway (through amalgamation of the London and North Western Railway) respectively.

Its usage has declined further since the early 1990s, with the closure of the line between Round Oak and Walsall in 1993 and the branch to Pensnett a year later.

A signal box situated in the vicinity of the station was burnt down by arsonists in 2003, and was replaced by a ground frame.

== The site today ==
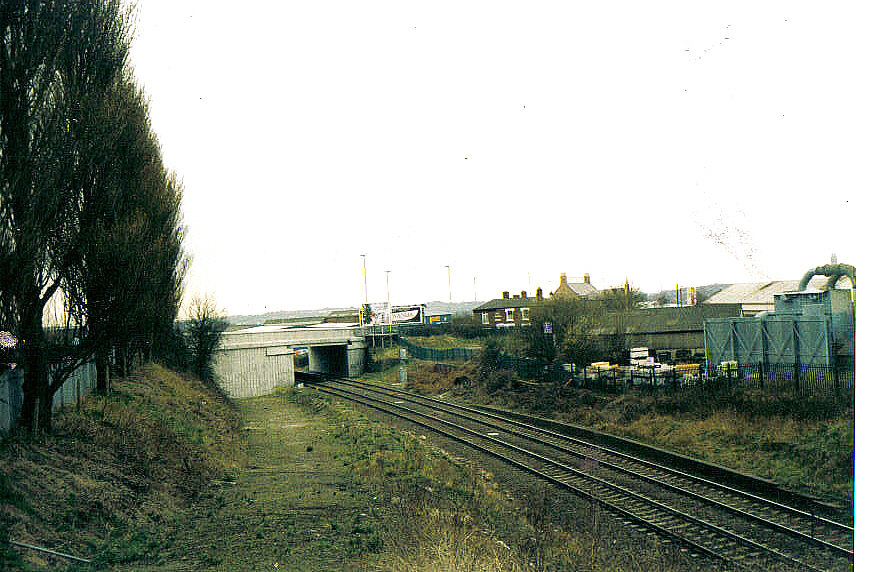
The station site today

Only freight trains pass through the former site of the station, for access to the now declining Moor Lane Goods Yard a few hundred yards away on its own spur line.

The station has been largely built over, with a factory and several warehouses on one side and fenced off on the other.

== Kingswinford Junction ==
Kingswinford Junction is a railway junction on the old Oxford-Worcester-Wolverhampton Line (OWW), which allows trains to diverge on to the Wombourne Branch Line. The junction remains since it also allows access to Moor Lane Goods Yard. Trains rarely use this yard and it would appear the junction's use is minimal, if used at all, except for the occasional Network Rail maintenance train.

A section of the line to Pensnett remains in situ, but out of railway use.

== Moor Lane Goods Yard ==
This was an important goods yard that lay a few hundred yards from Brettell Lane station and across the tracks at Kingswinford Junction. Local coal mining and steel mills lead to rapid industrialisation of the area and heavy usage of the station in the early 20th century, but numbers had declined badly by the 1960s. The former carriage sidings and truck sidings are now out of use; current freight turnover is low and relates to a few nearby factories and warehouses.

=== History ===
It opened in 1852, to serve the local town and later took on transport significance with the nearby coal mines at the Delph/Amblecote pits, Amblecote Bank, not far from the Stourbridge Canal near Brettell Lane station.

It was adjacent to and serving a Higharcal Colliery, a bottle works, Springfieild Colliery, a clay pit and glass works from about 1890 to 1970.

The nearby station's goods yard served claypits, cement works, brickworks, an industrial retort, Brettell Lane Fire Brick Works and Brierley Iron Foundry Works from about 1890 to 1970.

=== The site today ===
The site was owned by EWS, but is now owned by DB Cargo UK.

It is unclear what remains in railway use, but only one siding remains, the rest of the site being brownfield waste land; however, a number of sidings are still in situ. The building that formerly housed Brierley Hill Steel Terminal now forms part of an industrial estate.

There is now no regular traffic using the yard, with only non-timetabled services from DB Cargo and Network Rail being seen. Despite this, a healthy amount of steel traffic bound for Round Oak Steel Terminal passes through the site, ensuring the line's continued use.

== Future development ==
Phase 2 of the West Midlands Metro would have seen the station become part of the local tram network, with the line reopening between Walsall and Stourbridge, via Dudley Port, Dudley and the Merry Hill Shopping Centre for trams which will share the line with freight trains. In March 2011, the business plan for the reopening of the line between Stourbridge and Walsall was submitted to Network Rail.

In 2019, PMOL (the operators of the Stourbridge Shuttle) announced plans for the creation of the Dudley and Stourbridge Light Railway, using similar Parry People Mover Trains to operate a service from the Waterfront to Stourbridge Junction, via Brierley Hill and Stourbridge Town. This would see the northern end of the line creating a tram interchange with services to Dudley, Wolverhampton and Birmingham, whilst the southern end of the line will create a direct link to National Rail services. A feasibility study is currently being undertaken.

== See also ==
- Brierley Hill
- Stourbridge Junction railway station
- South Staffordshire Line
- Dudley Freightliner Terminal
- Round Oak Steel Terminal
