= Bumble Hole line =

Closed railway line in West Midlands, England

Coordinates: 52.4909°N 2.0688°W

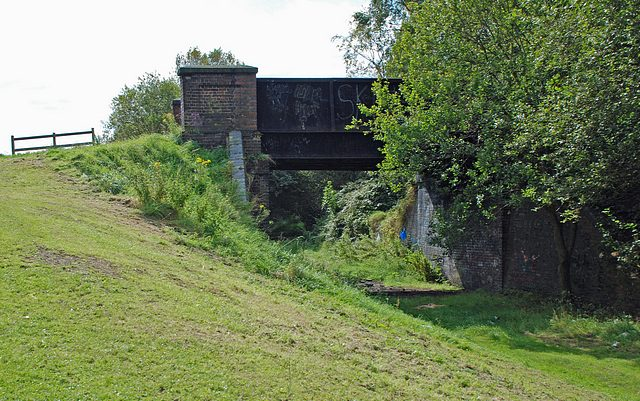
- The Greaves Road Bridge at the edge of Netherton Park. The Withymoor Basin branch line passed under this bridge.

Overview
- Status: Closed
- Termini: Blowers Green; Old Hill
- Stations: 4

Service
- Type: Heavy rail
- Operator(s): British Rail

History
- Opened: 1 March 1878
- Closed: January 1968 (completely)

Technical
- Line length: 3 miles (4.8 km)
- Number of tracks: 2
- Track gauge: 4 ft 8 1/2 in (1,435 mm)

The Bumble Hole line was a short railway located in Central England. It opened in 1878 to give Dudley a direct railway link with Old Hill, over a distance of three miles. It was used as a connection between Dudley town and Snow Hill, and was dual track all of the way, to allow its inclusion into a mainline route. As with most lines of this nature, patronage was extremely poor and passengers would often find themselves alone on the single car Class 122 DMU that operated the service in later years.

== Opening ==
The line was opened by the GWR on 1 March 1878 on the same day as the line from Old Hill to Halesowen started service.

== Closure ==
Passenger services along the line were withdrawn in 1964 due to the Beeching Axe. A study showed that just one person per day used the Windmill End station. The line remained open to goods traffic until January 1968 with the track being removed a year later.

== Remains ==
By 1980 most signs of the line had been obliterated, at least to the casual observer, though a number of reminders of the line – including embankments, cuttings, three former road bridges over the line (at New Road, St. Peters Road and Greaves Road) and the remains of other bridges including an overbridge in Old Hill – are still in existence some 50 years after the line's closure. With the assistance of a pre-Beeching closure map and the current Explorer Ordnance Survey map of the area (sheet 219) it is possible to trace much of the line either on foot or on satellite images. The OS map shows much of the Netherton end of the line (including the canal branch) is now a footpath and it is possible to walk on the former track bed from the New Road crossing, south of Dudley, to the site of Windmill End station and a little beyond with just a few detours around new buildings. Access to the line is more difficult as it approaches Old Hill but since little has been built on, its route is clearly visible on satellite images. The junction with the former South Staffordshire Line near New Road, Dudley, was obliterated in the late 1990s when the Dudley Southern By-Pass was built, although the South Staffordshire Line itself has been preserved and is set to re-open to goods trains and was an extension to the Midland Metro tram network from 2023 although cost overruns on the other part of the Metro extension has delayed this until 2025 at the earliest.

== See also ==
- Bumble Hole Branch Canal
