= Dudley railway station =

Former railway station in West Midlands, England

Dudley
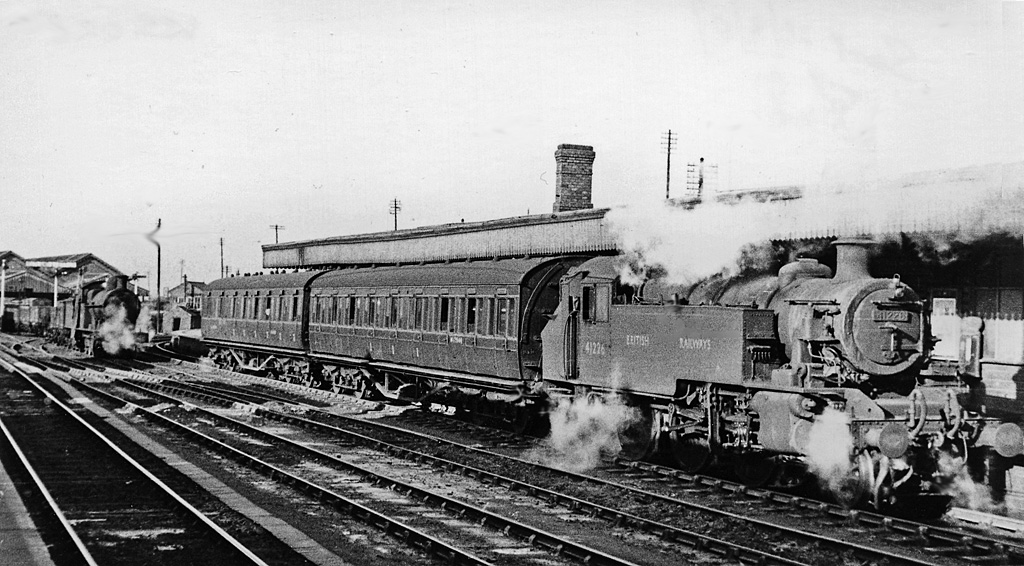
- An auto-train in 1961

General information
- Location: Dudley, Metropolitan Borough of Dudley, England
- Coordinates: 52.5146°N 2.0747°W
- Grid reference: SO950907
- Platforms: 5

Other information
- Status: Disused

History
- Original company: Oxford, Worcester and Wolverhampton Railway
- Pre-grouping: Great Western Railway
- Post-grouping: Great Western Railway

Key dates
- 1 May 1850: Opened
- 6 July 1964: Closed for passengers
- 1967: Closed completely
Location

Dudley railway station served the market town of Dudley, in the West Midlands, England. It was built where the Oxford-Worcester-Wolverhampton Line and the South Staffordshire Line diverged to Wolverhampton, and to Walsall and Lichfield respectively.

== History ==
The station was built as a collaboration between the Oxford, Worcester and Wolverhampton Railway (which was soon to fall into the hands of the Great Western Railway) and the London and North Western Railway (which had taken control of the South Staffordshire Railway – the company that had constructed the line from Lichfield to Dudley, via Walsall). The latter eventually became part of the London, Midland and Scottish Railway. The station was completed in 1860 and had a goods shed.

A racecourse had been situated just north of the station until the mid-1840s, when it was closed to make way for the railway. Its name was revived during the 1980s when Racecourse Colliery, a model colliery, was opened on the site as part of the Black Country Living Museum.

The line had reasonable passenger usage until about the early 1880s, when it began to slump at several stations, leading to the line becoming a largely freight-only operation in 1887. It would remain open for goods traffic, which was considerable at this time, as the district had become highly industrialised in the then heyday of the Black Country's industrial past.

As the local industry declined and road transport became more common, the station entered a post-World War II decline, although not as heavily as most others on the line.

Preceding station	Disused railways	Following station
Terminus	Great Western Railway; Later British Rail; Bumble Hole (1878-1964)	Blowers Green
Dudley Port	Great Western Railway; Later British Rail; Birmingham Snow Hill-Wolverhampton Line - Dudley Branch (1852-1964)	Terminus
Tipton Five Ways	Oxford, Worcester and Wolverhampton Railway; Later Great Western Railway, then British Rail; Oxford-Worcester-Wolverhampton (1852-1962)	Blowers Green
Dudley Port or Terminus	South Staffordshire Railway; Later LNWR, then LMS, finally BR; South Staffs Line (inc. Dudley-Stourbridge Junction to 1962) (1852-1964)	Blowers Green or Terminus

== Closure ==
The station was popular with local people who appreciated its convenient location and frequent trains, with high numbers of passengers still using the services into the 1950s. The OW&WR line from Stourbridge Junction to Wolverhampton Low Level closed to passengers in 1962, although a small number of Sunday trains non-stop between Wolverhampton and Worcester continued to use the line until March 1967. Despite the station's high passenger turnover, Dudley remained as a terminus for trains from Walsall on the South Staffordshire Line, Old Hill on the Bumble Hole Line and Birmingham Snow Hill until the Beeching Axe in 1964.

== Further development ==
The buildings of Dudley station remained open for parcels until early 1967, when they were knocked down and replaced by Dudley Freightliner Terminal. It was one of the first of its kind in Britain.

The Freightliner Terminal closed in 1989 and the line passing through Dudley closed to all traffic in 1993. Over the next 23 years, the railway and former station and freightliner terminal sites became increasingly overgrown with vegetation, although this was cleared in early 2017 to make way for the planned reopening of the line to the Midland Metro and goods trains.

Since 1986, there have been plans to redevelop the station to become part of the local West Midlands Metro tram network. The first part of the line between Wednesbury and Brierley Hill is currently under construction. After 30 years of delays and difficulties in securing funding, the scheme was approved the government in the autumn of 2016, with clearance of vegetation and the remaining track getting underway early in 2017 and full-scale work beginning around two years later. Initially planned to open in 2021, due to cost overruns work on the new line is still ongoing in 2026, with opening scheduled for August, with funding currently only secured to build the line as far as Brierley Hill.

== Gallery ==
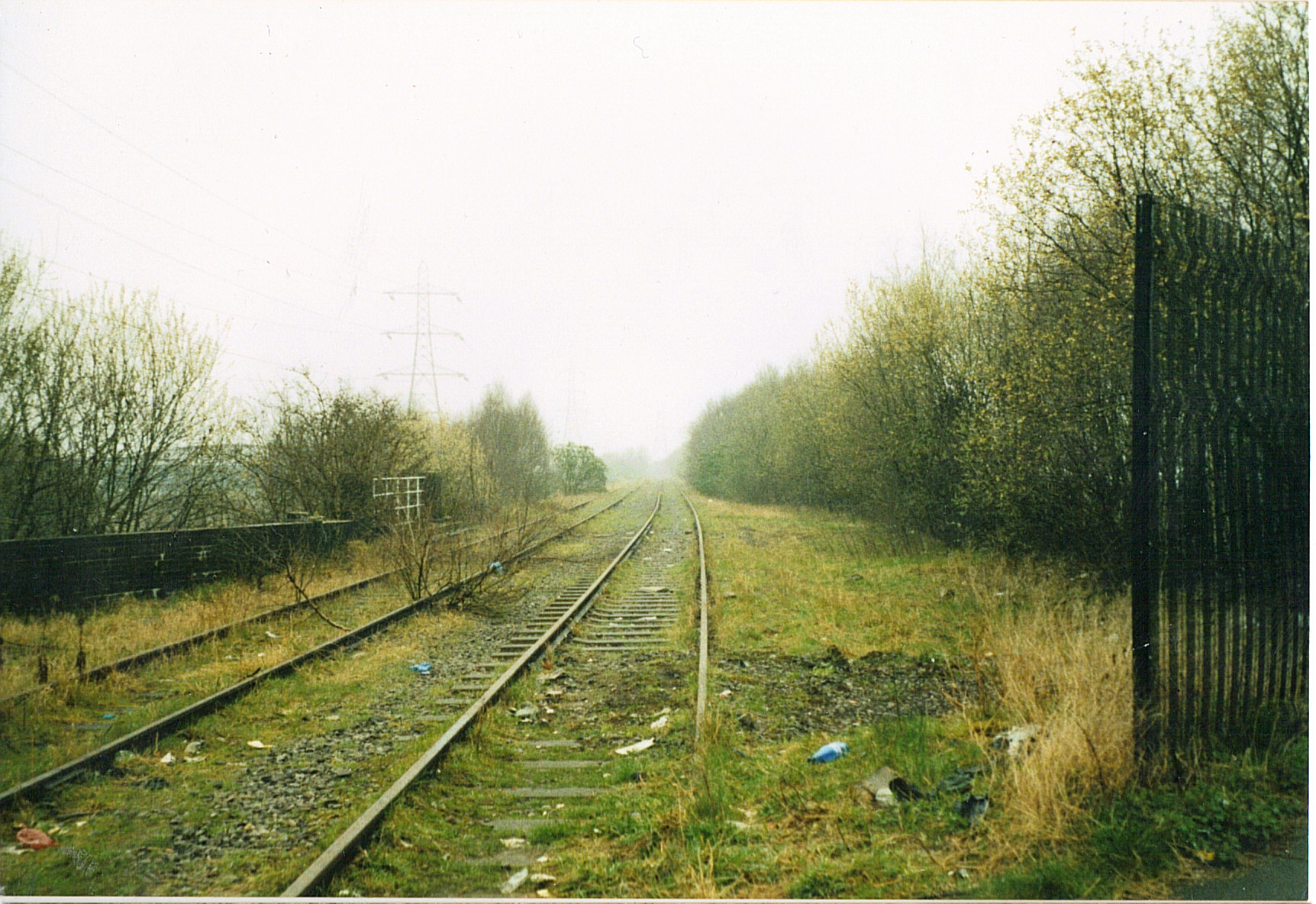
The old railway lines that once ran between Dudley Port and the station in 2001.

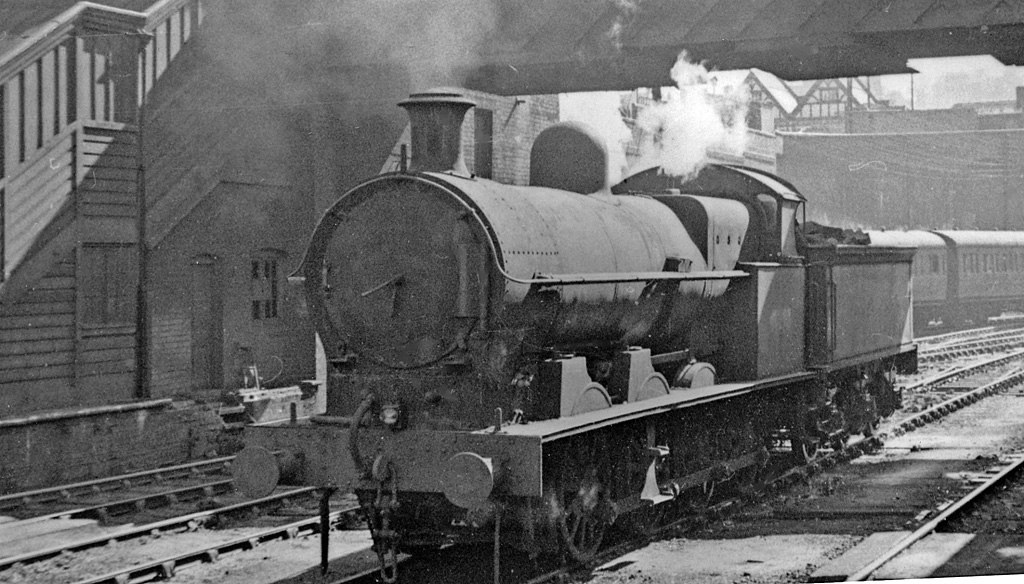
View southward, towards Dudley Tunnel and Stourbridge Junction in 1951.

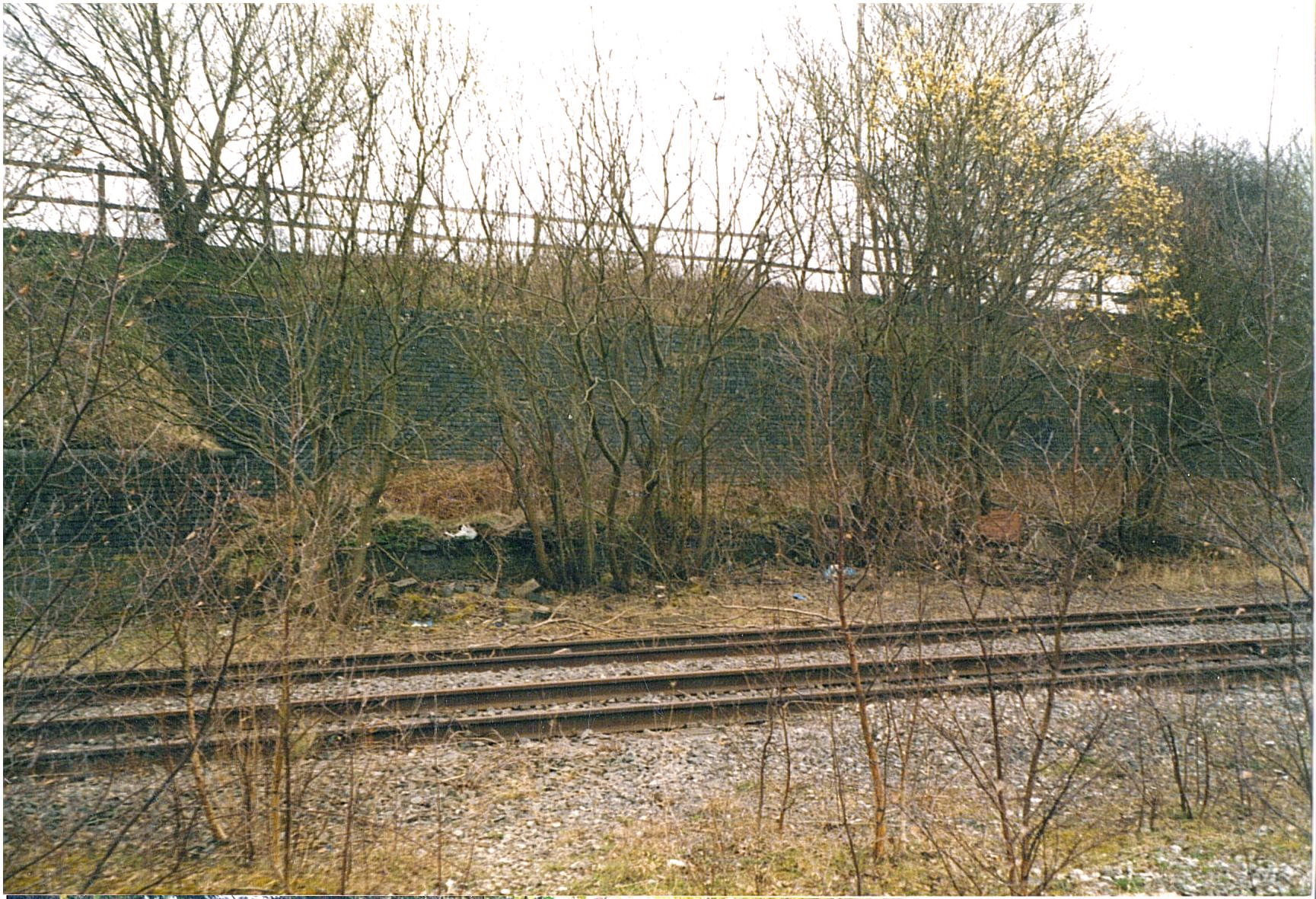
A picture of the former Dudley Freightliner Terminal signal box's remnants in 2002, more than ten years after it was closed and destroyed by arsonists.

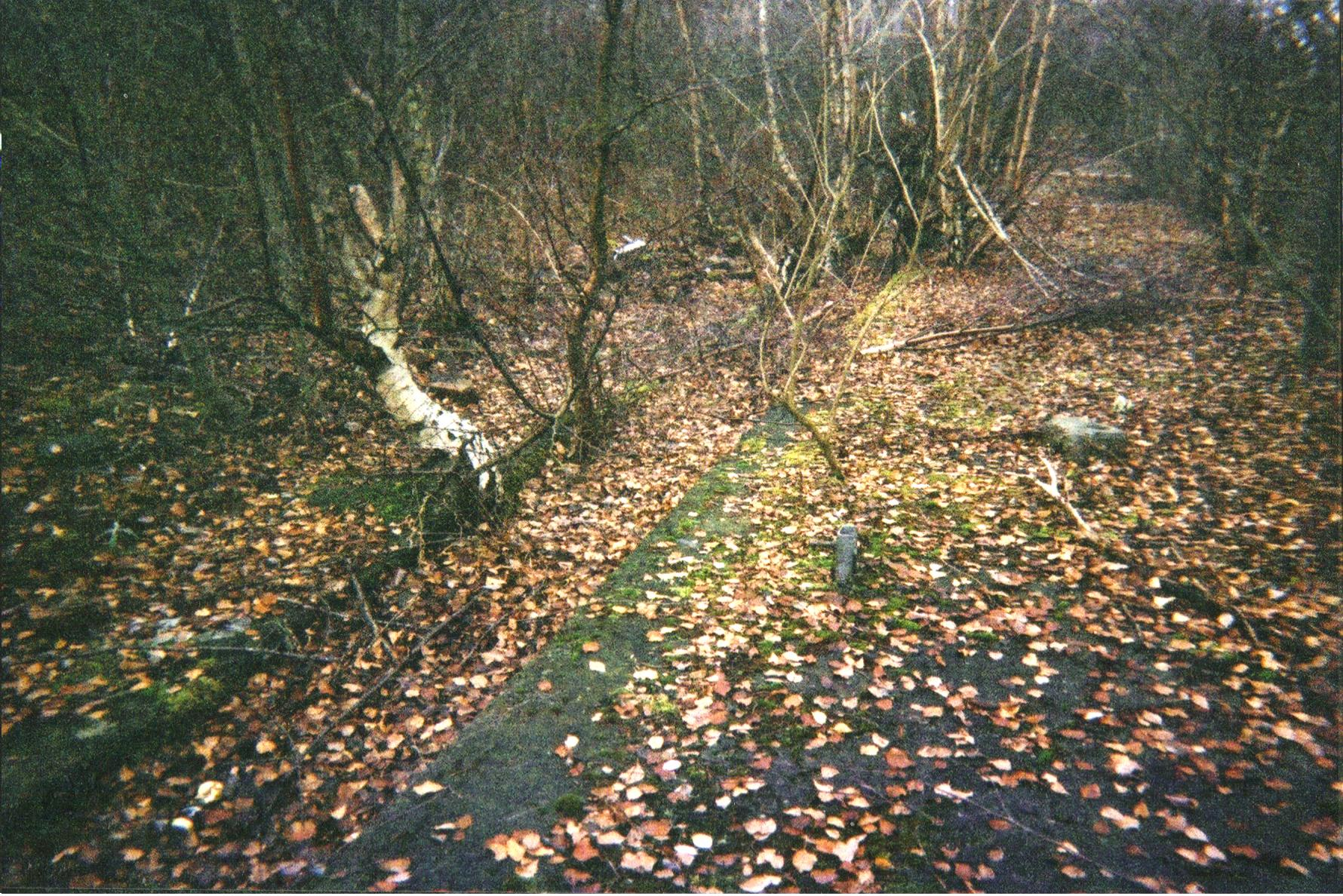
Dudley Town's former station platform in 2011, with an old channel carved in it. The channel is for a former gantry crane at the Freightliner depot that later covered the station platforms and goods yard.

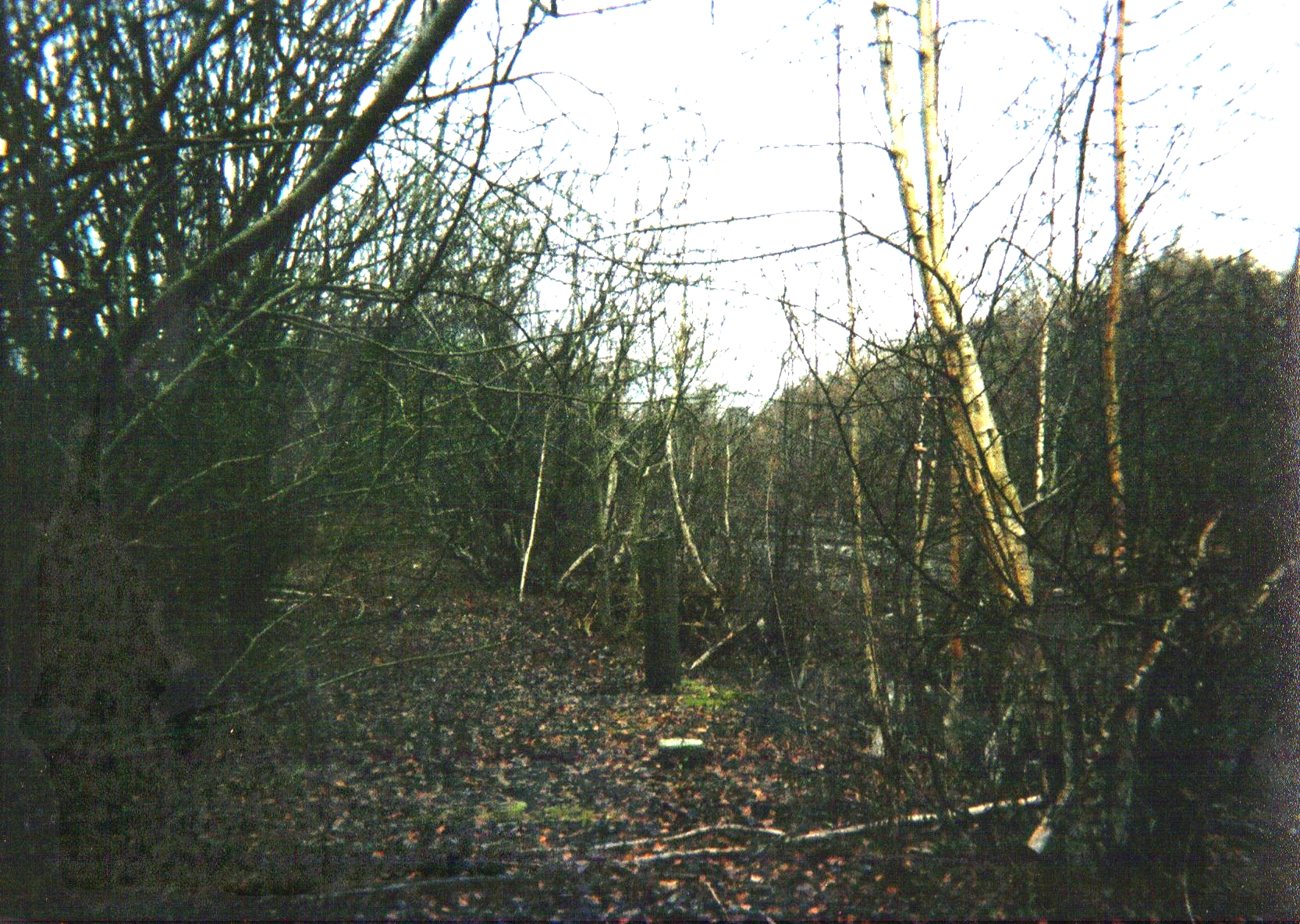
Dudley Town's former station platform in 2011. There is a channel (out of shot) in it for a former gantry crane at the Freightliner depot that later covered the station platforms and goods yard.

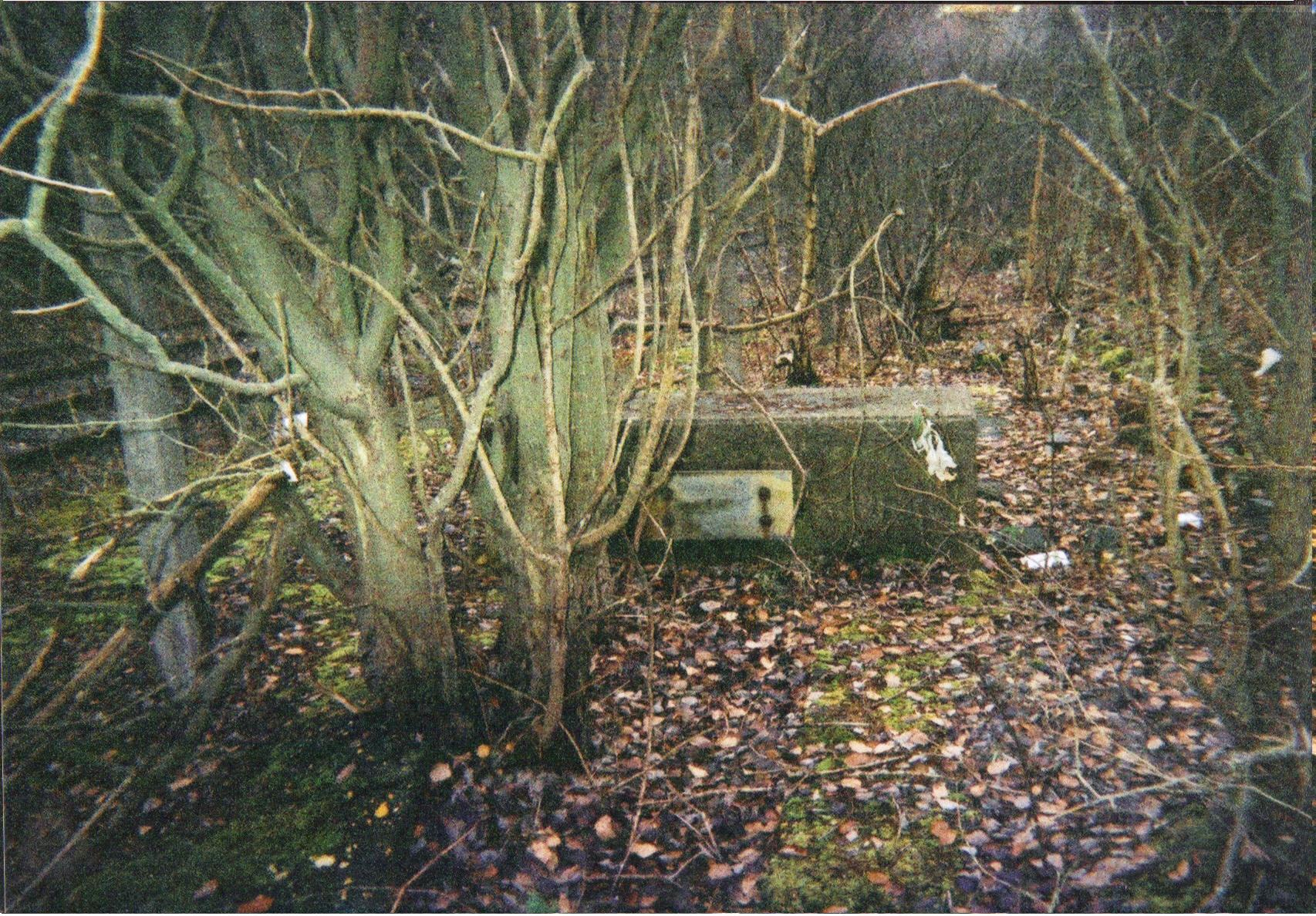
Dudley Town's former station platform in 2011, with some buffers and the same old channel carved in it.

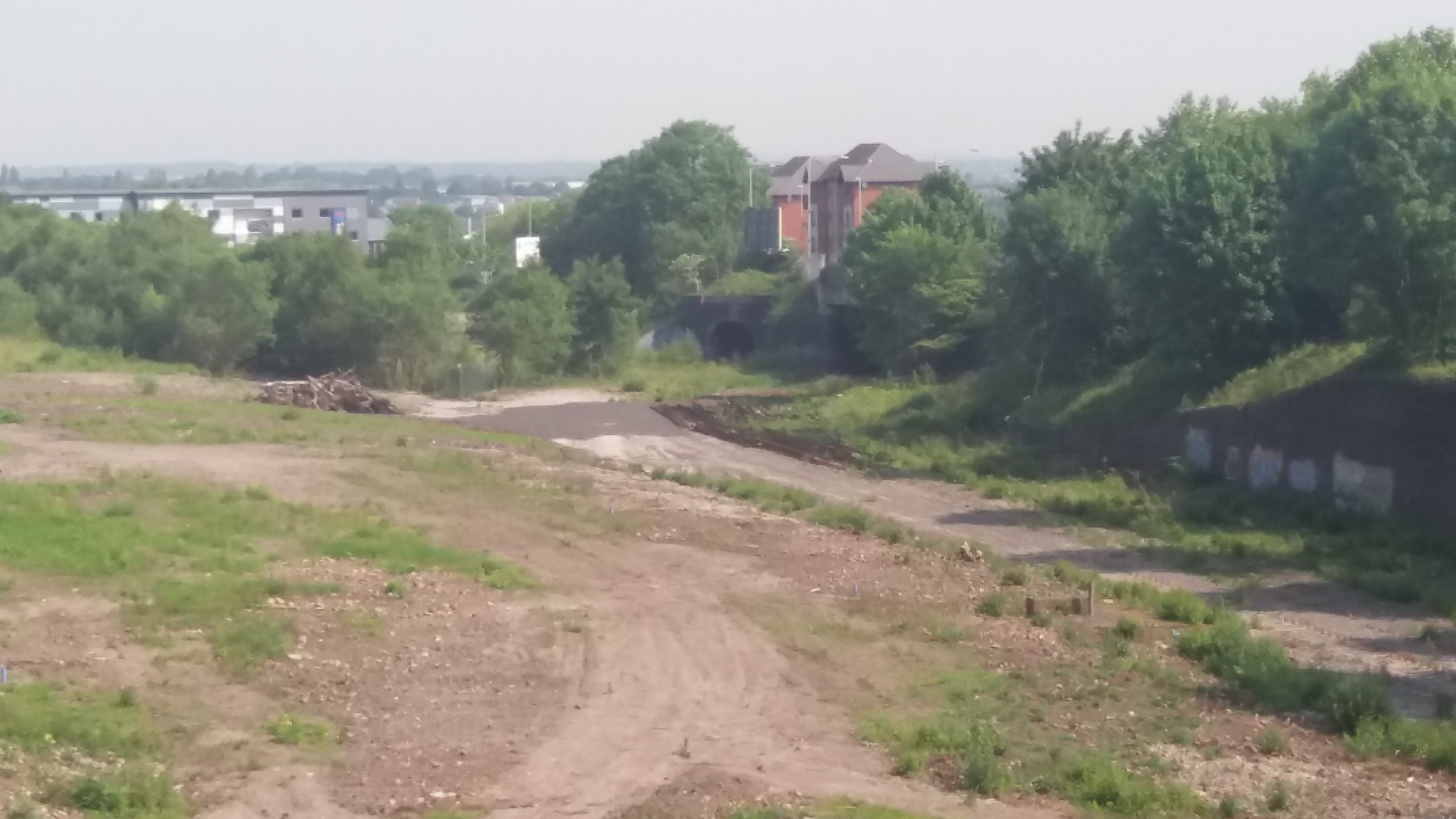
Dudley station site and freight terminal following the clearance of vegetation for the metro extension, a new light rail test centre and for freight traffic
