= Simms =

Simms may refer to:

== First or middle name ==
- Anna Simms Banks (1862–1923), American educator and politician
- E. Simms Campbell (1906–1971), American cartoonist
- Mary Simms Oliphant (1891–1988), American historian
- Simms Taback (1932–2011), American author and illustrator

== Last name ==
- Aamir Simms (born 1999), American basketball player
- Albert G. Simms (1882–1964), American politician
- Allen Simms (born 1982), American triple jumper and entrepreneur
- Andrew Simms, British writer and political analyst
- Bekah Simms (born 1990), Canadian composer
- Ben Simm (disambiguation), including Ben Simms
- Bill Simms (1908–2002), American baseball player
- Bishop Simms (1767–1829), British organist and composer
- Brendan Simms, Irish historian and professor
- Charles Simms (disambiguation), multiple people
- Chris Simms (born 1980), American football player
- Chris Simms (born 1969), British author
- Christel Simms, Filipino-American swimmer
- Clyde Simms (born 1982), American soccer player
- Colin Simms (born 1939), British biologist and poet
- David J. Simms (1933–2018), Irish mathematician and professor
- Dia Simms, American businesswoman
- Edward Simms, (1800–1893), British organist and composer
- Ellis Simms (born 2001), English footballer
- Eric Simms (disambiguation), multiple people
- Ernie Simms (1891–1971), English footballer
- Frederick Simms (disambiguation), multiple people
- George Simms (1910–1991), Irish bishop
- Ginny Simms (1913–1994), American singer and actress
- Gordon Simms (born 1981), British footballer
- Greg Simms, American politician
- Hal Simms (1919–2002), American television announcer
- Hank Simms (1923–2013), American voice actor
- Harry Simms (disambiguation), multiple people
- Heather Simms (born 1970), American actress
- Henry Simms (c. 1717–1747), English thief
- Henry Simms (1804–1872), English organist and composer
- Herbert George Simms (1898–1948), English architect
- Hilda Simms (1918–1994), American actress
- Jack Simms (born c. 1903), English footballer
- James Simms (disambiguation), multiple people
- Jeptha Root Simms (1807–1883)
- John Simms (disambiguation), multiple people
- Jonathan Simms (1984–2011), Irish disease patient
- Juliet Simms (born 1986), American singer-songwriter
- Justin Simms (born 1973), Canadian filmmaker
- Kenneth Simms (born 1986), American basketball player
- Kevin Simms (born 1964), English rugby union footballer
- Kimberley Simms (born 1963), American actress
- Kirsten Simms (born 2004), American ice hockey player
- Larry Simms (1934–2009), American actor
- Laurene Simms, American educator and hearing advocate
- Len Simms (1943–2026), Canadian politician
- Lise Simms (born 1963), American actress, singer, and dancer
- Lorraine Simms, Canadian painter
- Mabel Robinson Simms (1914–2005), American jazz pianist
- Madeleine Simms (1930–2011), British activist
- Marcus Simms (born 1997), American football player
- Marian Simms (1951–2021), Australian political scientist
- Margaret Simms (born 1947), American economist
- Margo Simms, known professionally as Margeaux, Canadian singer-songwriter and fashion designer
- Matt Simms (disambiguation), multiple people
- Michael Simms (disambiguation), multiple people
- Mike Simms (born 1967), American baseball player
- Mit Simms (1873–1957), American politician
- Neville Simms (born 1944), British businessman and civil engineer
- Noel Simms (1935–2017), Jamaican musician
- Paul Simms (born 1966), American television writer and producer
- Phil Simms (born 1954), American football player
- Rachael Simms (born 1983), Scottish curler
- Randy Simms, Canadian politician and radio host
- Richard Simms, American politician
- Robert Simms (disambiguation), multiple people
- Ron Simms, American motorcycle builder
- Royston Simms (1894–1978), English cricketer
- Samuel Simms (disambiguation), multiple people
- Sarah Simms, a fictional character in the DC Universe
- Scott Simms (born 1969), Canadian politician
- Shirley Simms, American singer-songwriter
- Sterling Simms (born 1982), American singer-songwriter
- Steve Simms, Australian rugby league footballer
- Stuart O. Simms (born 1950), American politician
- Thomas Simms (disambiguation), multiple people
- Travis Simms (born 1971), American boxer and politician
- Vic Simms, Australian singer-songwriter
- Wendy Simms, fictional character from CSI: Crime Scene Investigation
- Wesley Simms, co-founder in 1938 of the Redfern All Blacks, an Indigenous Australian rugby league club
- William Simms (disambiguation), multiple people
- Zastrow Simms (1940–2013), American civil rights activist

== Places ==
- Simms, Montana
- Simms, Oklahoma
- Simms, Texas
- Simms Building, New Mexico's first modern, International Style skyscraper
- Simms Stream, a river in northern New Hampshire in the United States

== Other ==
- Cooke, Troughton & Simms, a British instrument-making firm
  - Troughton & Simms
- Simms Independent School District
- Simms Motor Units Ltd, later Simms Group, a defunct British motor and electronics subsidiary of Lucas Industries
- Simm (hill), a hill in the British Isles that is over 600 m high and has a prominence of at least 30 m
