= William Sims (disambiguation) =

William Sims (1858–1936), was an admiral in the United States Navy.

William Sims may also refer to:

== Politics ==
- William Edward Sims (1842–1891), American politician
- William H. Sims (American politician) (1837–1920), American politician in Mississippi
- William Henry Sims (1872–1955), Canadian politician in Manitoba

== Others ==
- William Dillwyn Sims (1825–1895), English industrialist and artist
- William Sims (engineer), pioneer of the Cornish engine
- William L. Sims II (1896–1977), American businessman
- William Sims (American football) (b. 1970), American football linebacker

== See also ==
- Willie Sims (disambiguation)
- William Simms (disambiguation)
