= St Thomas' Church, Stourbridge =

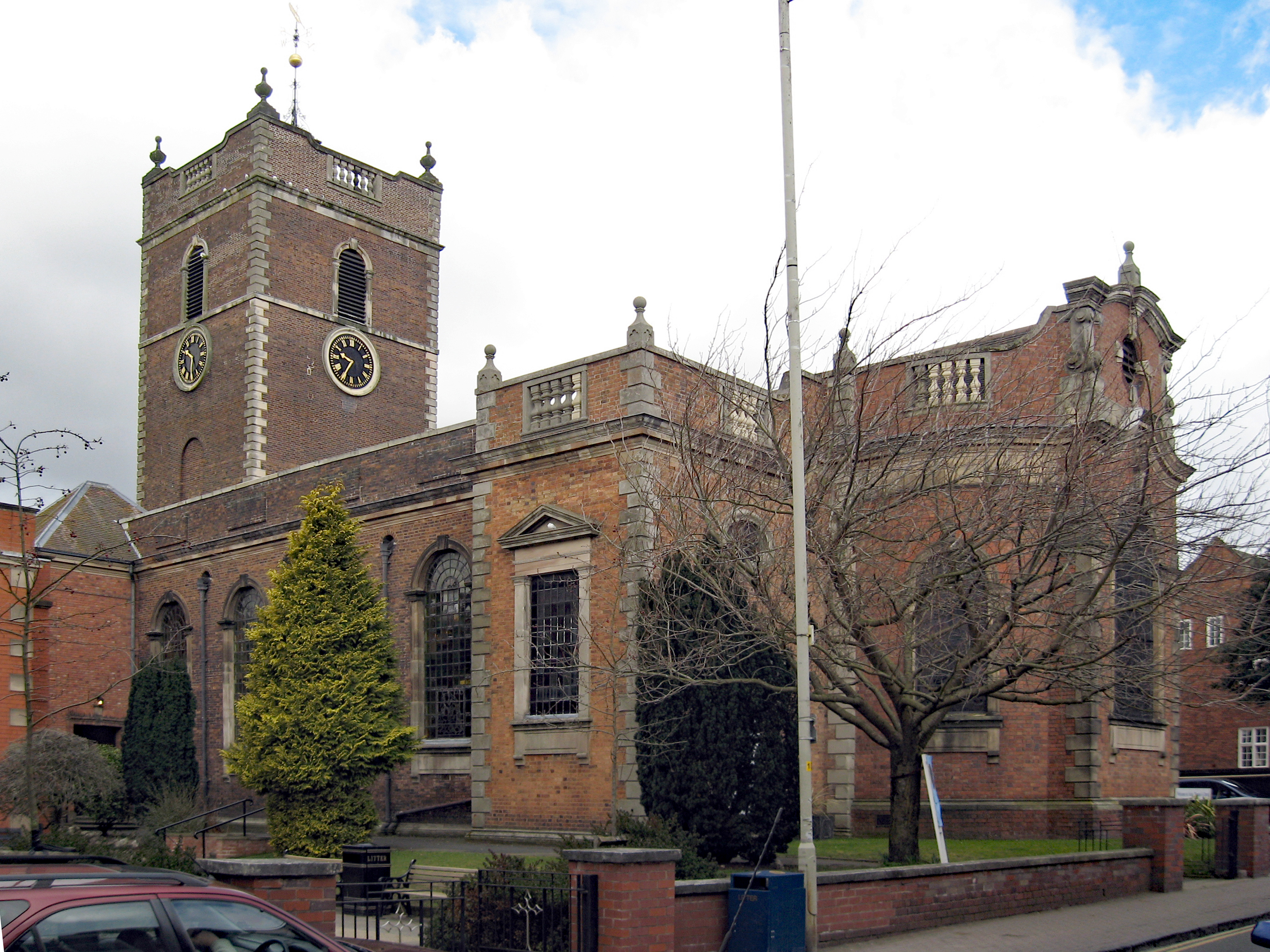
- St Thomas' Church, Stourbridge
- St Thomas' Church, Stourbridge
- 52°27′20.37″N 2°8′52.80″W
- Location: Stourbridge
- Country: England
- Denomination: Church of England
- Churchmanship: Liberal Catholic
- Website: stthomasstourbridge.org

History
- Dedication: St Thomas

Architecture
- Completed: 1726

Administration
- Diocese: Diocese of Worcester
- Archdeaconry: Archdeaconry of Dudley
- Deanery: Stourbridge
- Parish: Stourbridge

St Thomas' Church, Stourbridge, is a Grade I listed parish church in the Church of England in Stourbridge, West Midlands County, England.

== History ==
The church dates from 1726. The chancel was added in 1890 by William Bidlake.

== List of vicars ==
- Walter Hickman 1736 - 1742
- Charles Harris 1742 - 1782
- John Pattinson 1782 - 1808
- Joseph Taylor 1808 - 1833
- Giffard Wells 1833 - 1858
- Hugh Sherrard 1858 - 1908
- Thomas Ludovic Chavasse 1908 - 1909
- Thomas Graham Gilling-Lax 1910 - 1911
- Montague Stanhope Newland 1911 - 1944
- Thomas Whitney Uniacke Keith Murrey 1944 - 1951
- Robert Guy Pusey 1951 - 1959
- Basil Henry Trevor-Morgan 1959 - 1976
- Derek Leonard Barrett 1977 - 1991
- Stephen Hutchinson 1991 - 2003
- Ron Curtis 2005 - 2012
- Interregnum 2012 - 2015
- Andrew Sillis 2012–present

== Organ ==
There are records of organ in the church dating from 1809 when an instrument was installed by George Pike England. There have been subsequent rebuildings and renovations over the years, resulting in a 3-manual and pedal pipe organ. A specification of the organ from 2017 can be found on the National Pipe Organ Register.

=== Organists ===
- Samuel Simms 1809 - 1868 (succeeded by his son)
- Samuel Simms 1868 - ???? (afterwards organist of St John's Church, Ladywood Birmingham)
