= Samuel Simms =

Samuels Simms may refer to:

- Samuel Simms (1784–1868) English organist and composer
- Samuel Simms (1836-1885) English organist and composer
