= Harry Simms =

Harry Simms may refer to:

- Harry Simms (cricketer) (1888–1942), English cricket player
- Harry Simms (labor leader) (1911–1932), American labor movement leader

== See also ==
- Henry Simms (1717–1747), thief and highwayman
