= St Cyprian's Church, Hay Mills =

Church in Birmingham, England

Coordinates: 52°27′47″N 1°50′28″W

St. Cyprian's Church, Hay Mills
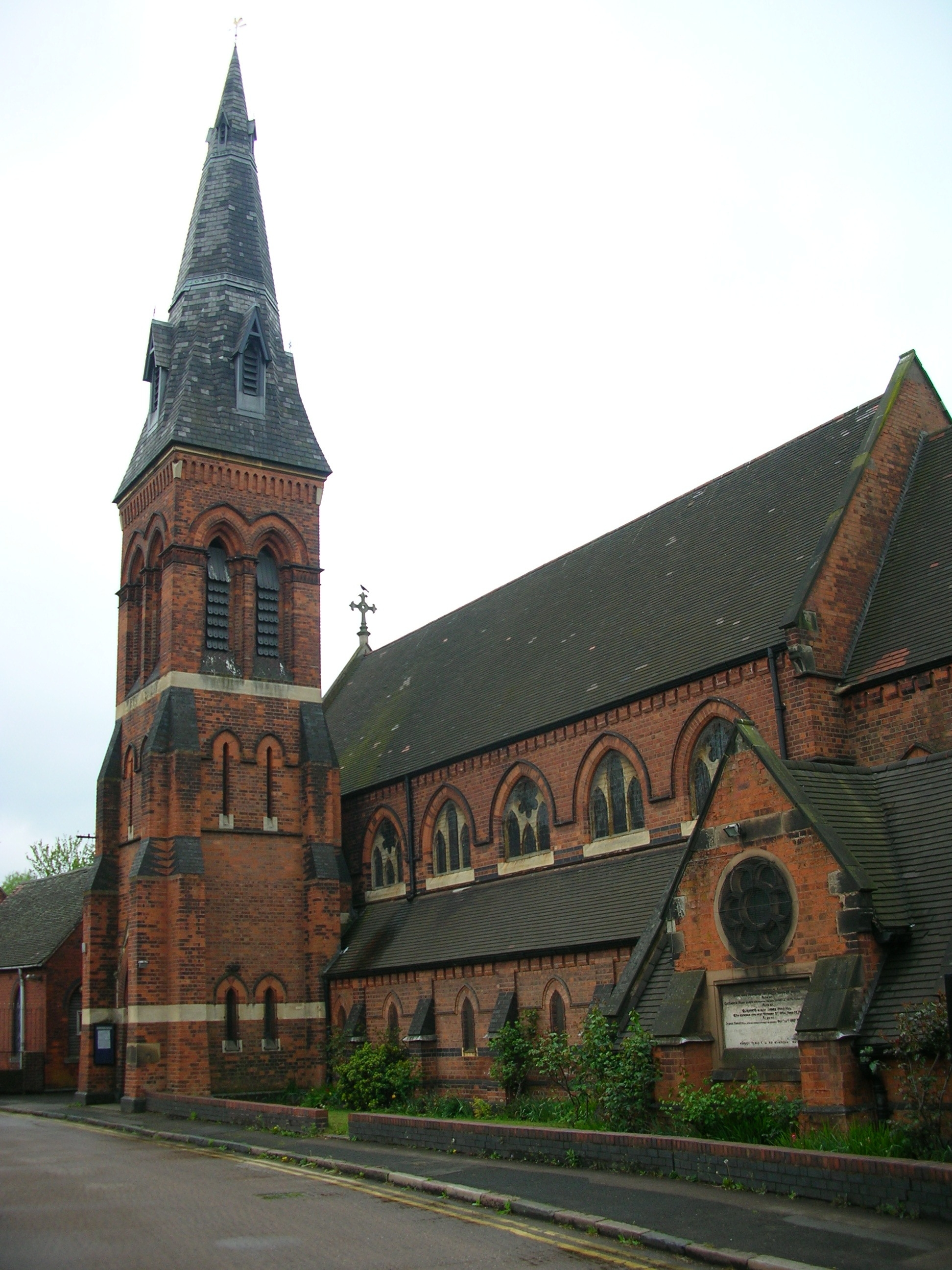
- St Cyprian's Church, Hay Mills
- St. Cyprian's Church, Hay Mills
- Denomination: Church of England
- Churchmanship: Broad Church
- Website: http://www.achurchnearyou.com/hay-mill-st-cyprian/

History
- Dedication: St. Cyprian

Administration
- Province: Canterbury
- Diocese: Birmingham
- Archdeaconry: Aston
- Deanery: Yardley and Bordesley
- Parish: Hay Mills

Clergy
- Vicar: Rev'd Roy Anetts

ann

St Cyprian's Church, Hay Mills is a parish church of the Church of England in Hay Mills, Birmingham, England. It is situated on the southern side of the main Birmingham to Coventry Road A45 at the end of a lane called the Fordrough that leads to the factory of Webster & Horsfall Ltd. It has long been associated with the Horsfall family who built the church and continue to be its owners. Built in the 19th century of red brick in the Gothic Revival style it is dedicated to St Cyprian the third century martyr and Bishop of Carthage who although coming from a wealthy background gave away a portion of his wealth to the poor of Carthage, he was beheaded by the Romans in 258. The church is now Grade II listed.

== History ==
James Horsfall was a wire drawer from Digbeth who invented high tensile steel wire. He moved to Hay Mill, a disused blade and sword factory at a water mill on the River Cole, rebuilding it as a steam-driven mill. The mill originally belonged to Hay Hall in Tyseley. In 1855 his company merged with Joseph Webster's of Penn Mill, Sutton Coldfield. He was a major manufacturer and exporter of the piano wire to Europe in 1824. In 1853 Horsfall had patented a heat treatment process which strengthened the wire. This led to improved piano wire (giving a near monopoly), wire for making needles in Redditch, fishhooks, and umbrella frames. The firm made the armoured wire for first successful transatlantic telegraph cable in 1866, using 30,000 miles of wire (1600 tons), made by 250 workers over 11 months. The strengthened wire also made possible the construction of aeroplanes and automobiles. The company today also makes springs.

Horsfall built houses and, in 1860, a schoolroom for his workers’ children. This was subsequently converted into a Chapel, the present school room which stands beside the church was built in 1863. The services for the chapel were conducted by the senior curate of Yardley and in 1866, Sunday evening services were held and a Sunday School started for the children. In the following year, six buttresses were erected and two stone crosses were fixed to the apex of the roof. In 1869 the organ and organ chamber were added. In 1873 the foundation stone was laid and work began to incorporate the former chapel as the present chancel. To this, designed by Frank Barlow Osborn but often wrongly ascribed to Martin & Chamberlain, and built by William Partridge was added the nave, the side aisles, the gallery, porch, tower, spire and vestries. The church was consecrated in 1878 and the first Church Council was elected in 1899 consisting of twelve members of the church, in addition to the Vicar, Churchwardens and six Sidesmen. During the Second World War in 1940 the building was damaged by enemy action but not beyond repair.

== Architecture ==
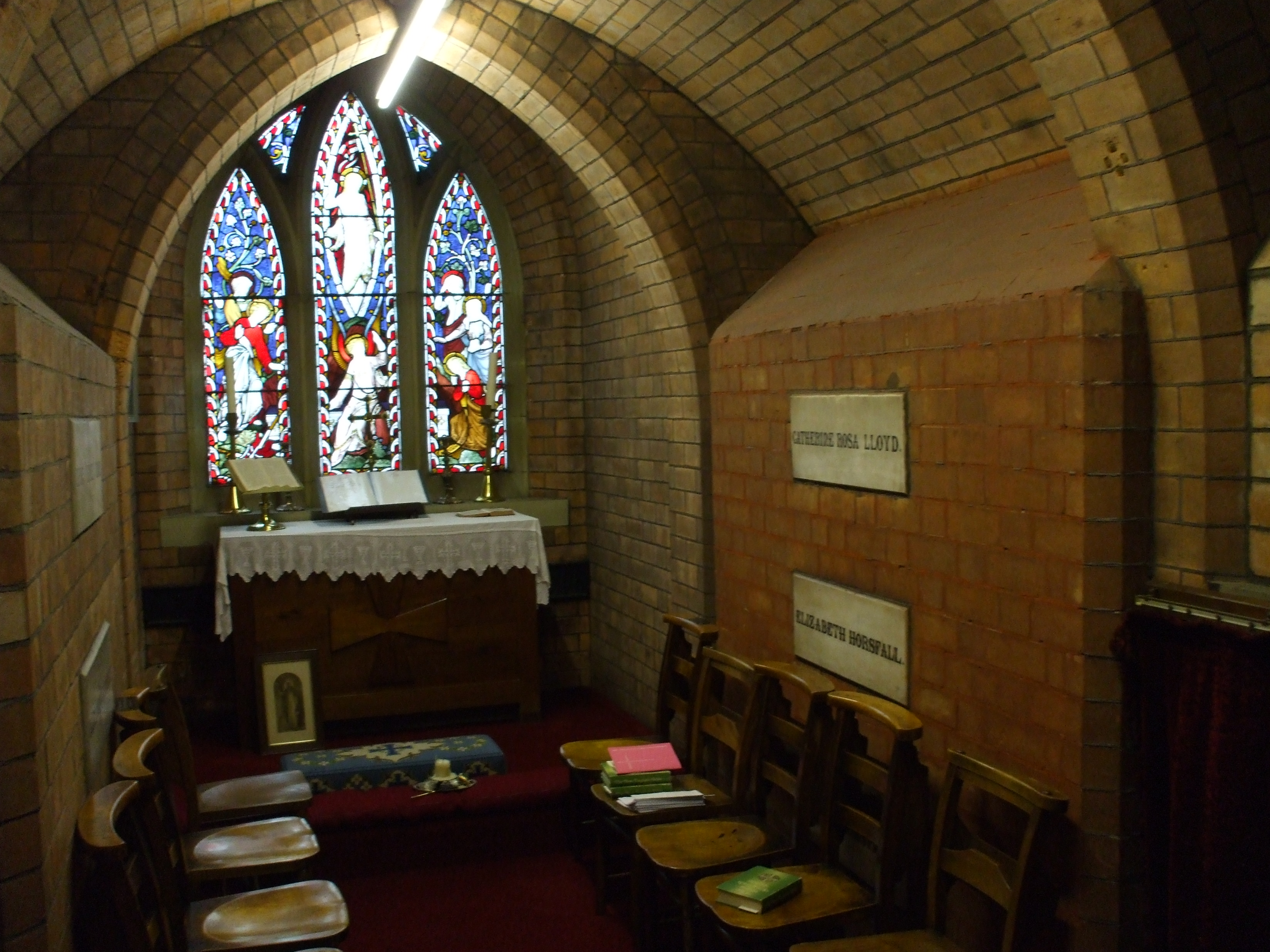
Interior of the Horsfall Mortuary Chapel

The church, in the Gothic style, is of red brick with a minimum use of black brick and stone dressings; it has a tile roof. It consists of a Nave, with a hammer beam roof, large plate tracery, clerestory windows and low, narrow aisles to North and South, whose bays are demarcated each by buttresses with a single lancet window, a chancel, with a barrelled roof, at the West end, vestries with a gallery above. In the South West corner there is a porch tower with a slated broach spire with 2 tiers of lucarnes it contains a bell bearing the date 1749. It was the former tannery bell, and was given to St Chad's, built by St Cyprian's and demolished in 1984, from where it went to St Cyprian's. In the South East corner is the Horsfall mortuary chapel, added in 1877 in memory of his daughter, Elizabeth Horsfall and now the resting place of James Horsfall and his family. This is in the tradition and position of a medieval chantry chapel for the saying of prayers or masses for the benefactor or founder of a church or abbey. In the tympanum above the entrance there is a sculpture of the transfiguration, or perhaps the Ascension.

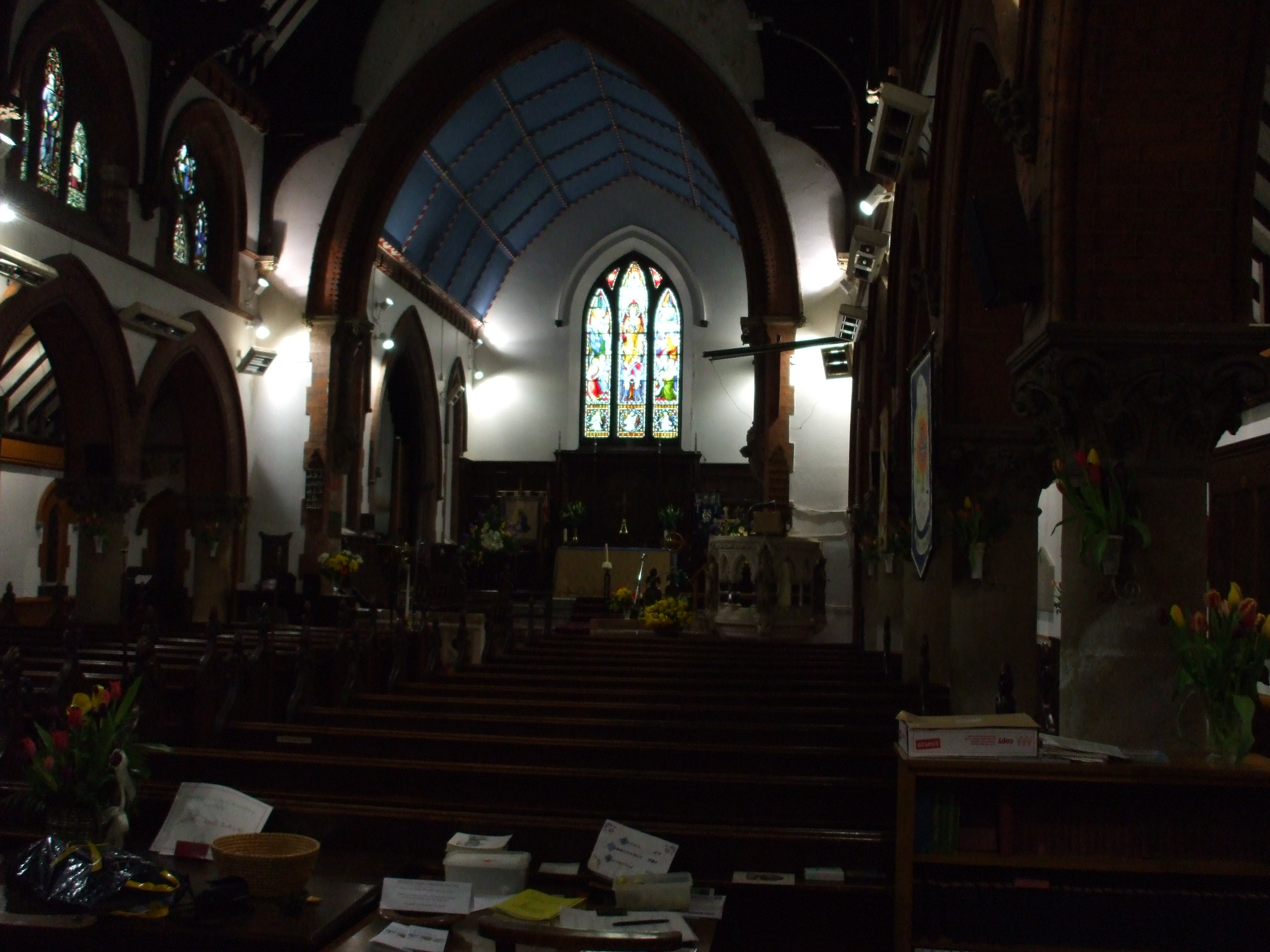
Interior, the Altar and East Window

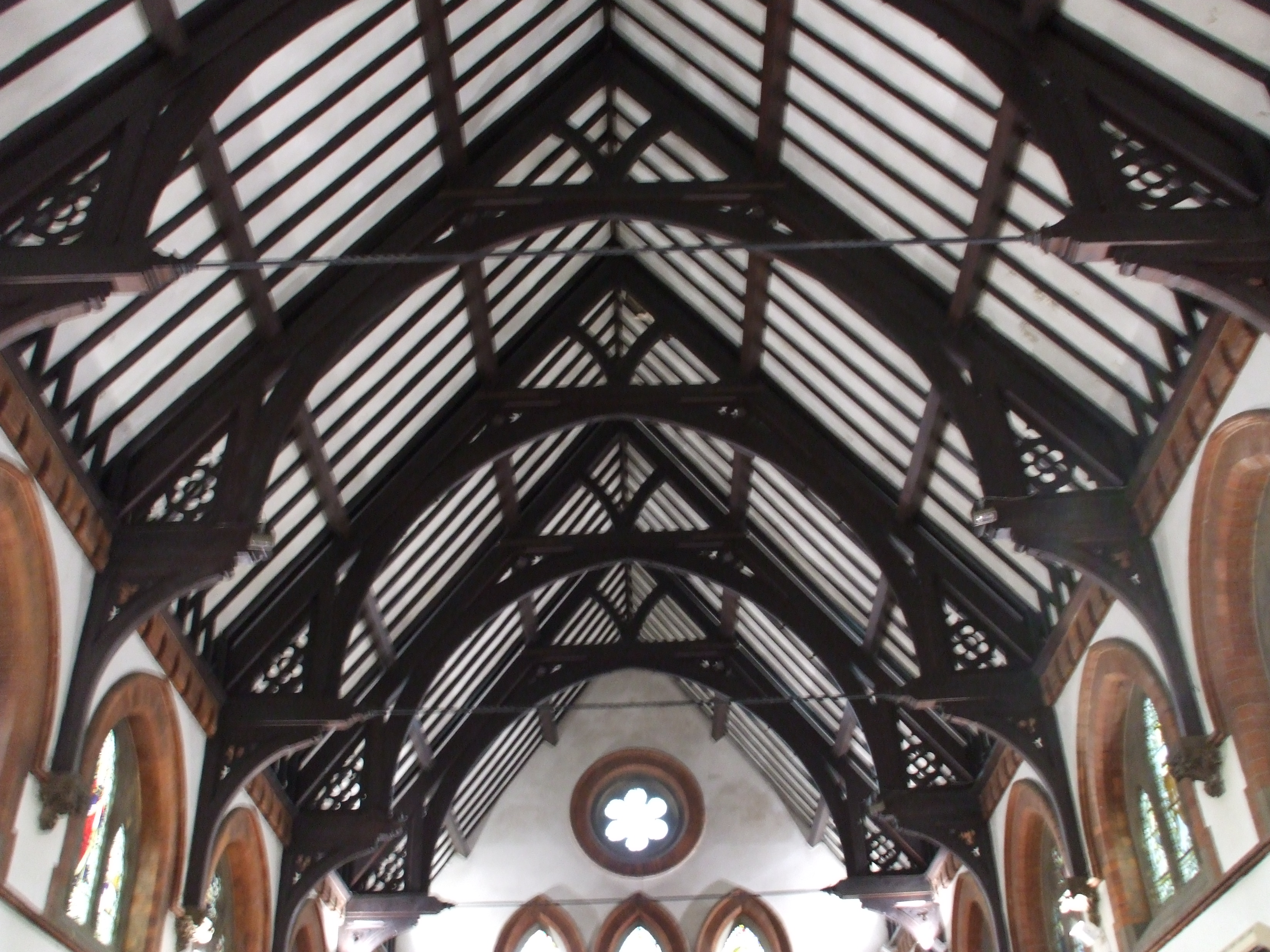
The Hammer beam Nave Roof

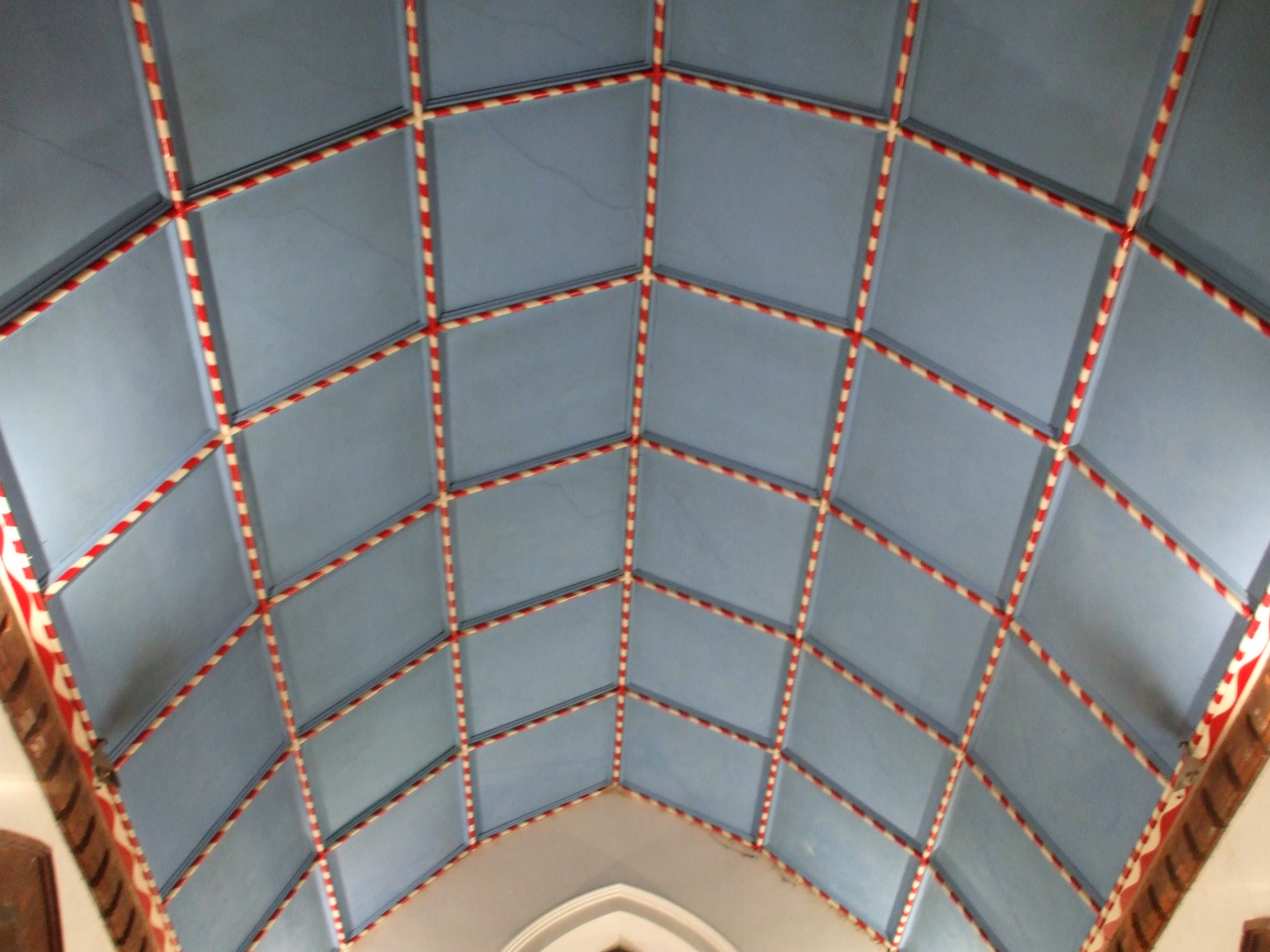
The Chancel Roof

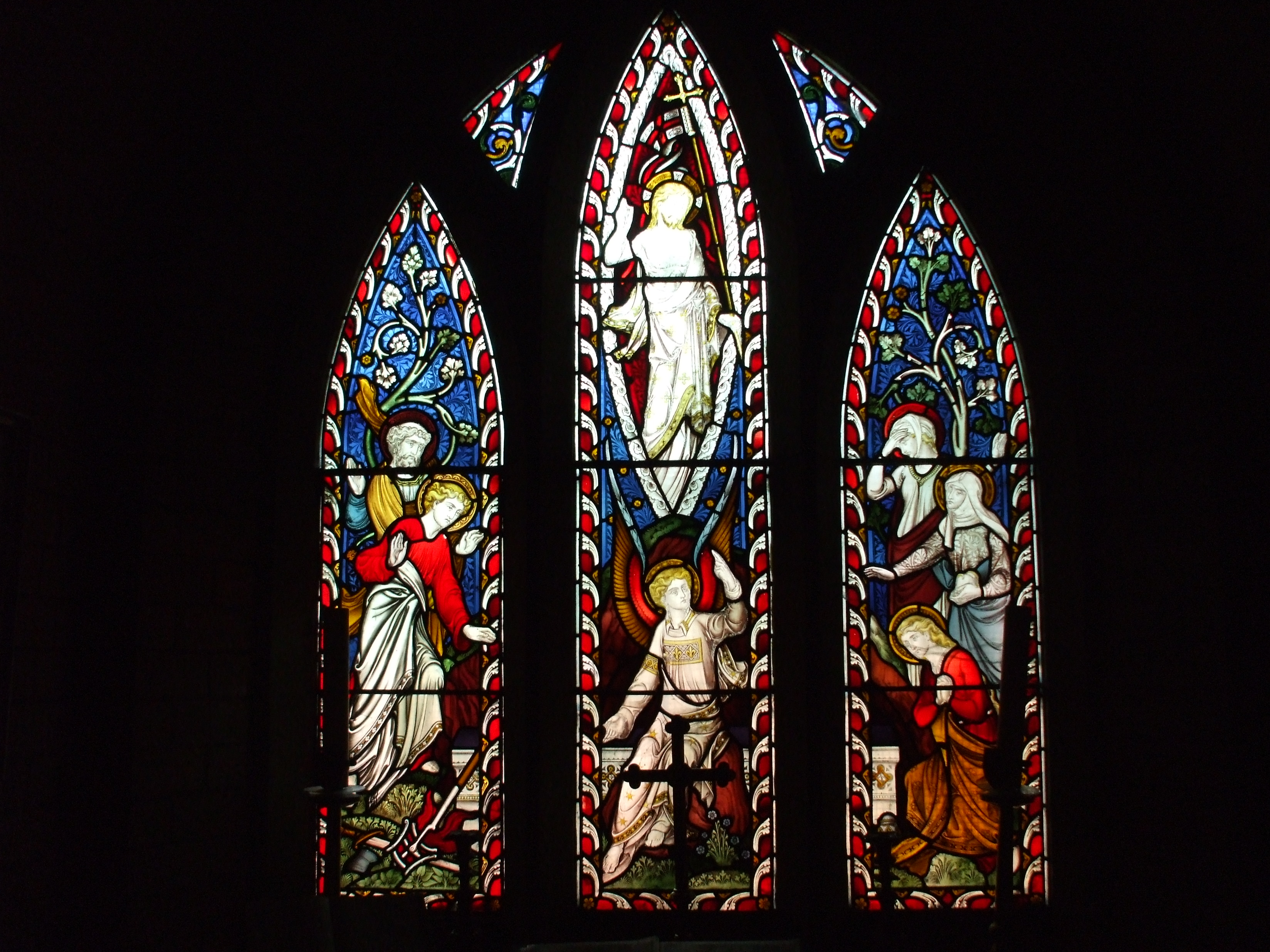
Stained glass in the East window of the Horsfall Chapel

== Stained glass ==
Inside, an intact and an extensive scheme of stained glass, designed by Hardman & Co.,who were also responsible for the stained glass in the Houses of Parliament. Those in the North aisle are illuminated allowing them to be viewed despite them having no natural light being enclosed as a security measure. The restoration was made possible by a donation from a late parishioner and the windows blessed at Easter 2010 with the following words; Almighty and eternal God, we give you thanks and praise for these stained glass images of your saints. For as often as we look on these images with our bodily eyes, As we look at them may we consider the actions of your saints and think about their sanctity for our inmitation. Bless and sanctify these windows made in honour and in memory of your only begotten Son, our Lord Jesus Christ and of these saints. We also remember our faithful servant John Ellison in whose memory these lights were re-installed. May the light of Christ always shine in our hearts. Amen

== West front ==
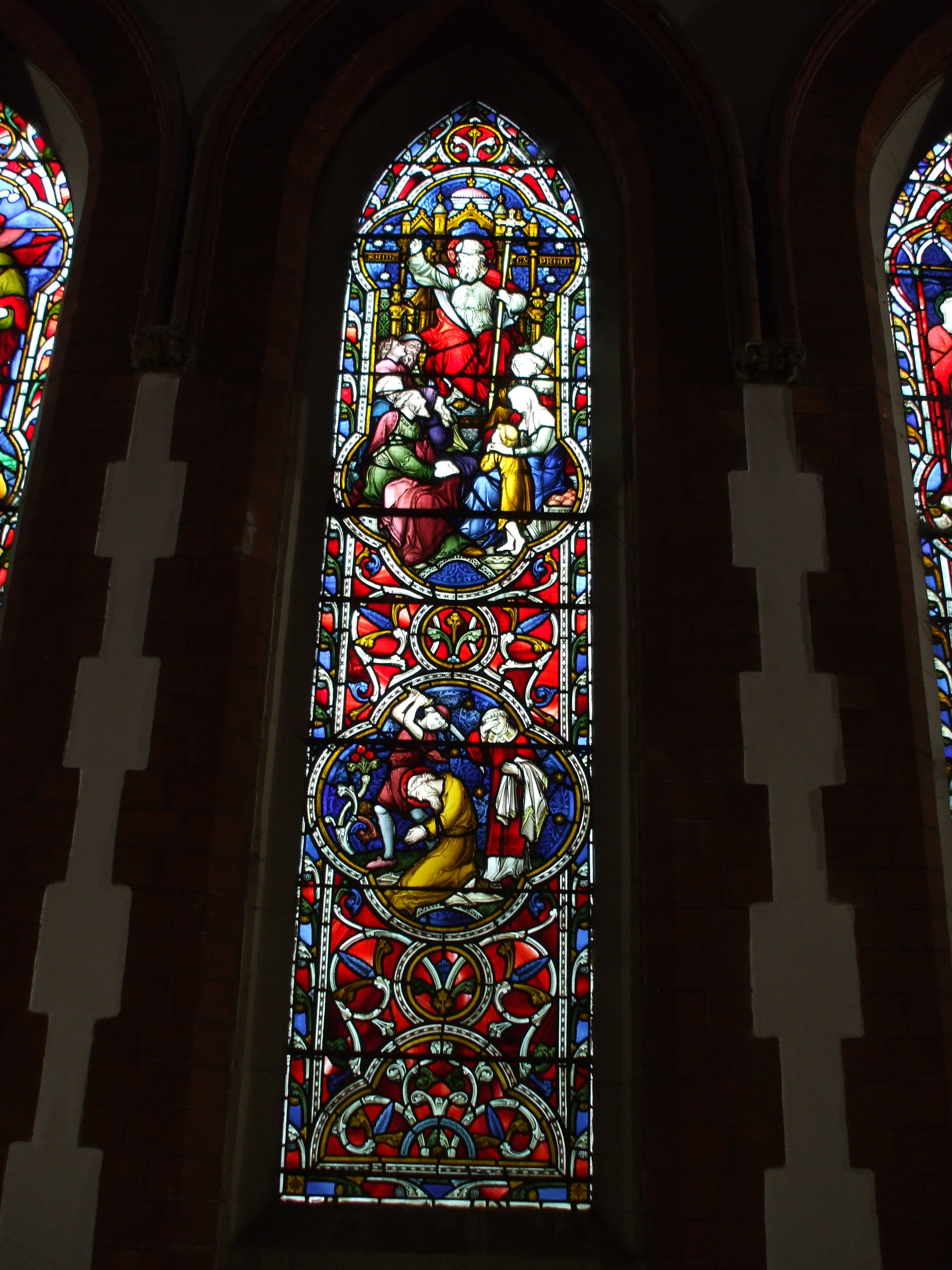
West front, Centre lancet window showing St Cyprian preaching and his martyrdom

By ascending to the galley the stained glass of the West front can be viewed near at hand. The top circular window shows a dove symbol of the Holy Spirit which came to the disciples at Pentecost.

There are then three large lancet windows.

The left window has at the top pictures of the birth of Christ and below the Annunciation to Mary.

The centre window has at the top St Cyprian engaged in preaching and below his martyrdom by being beheaded as a distraught clergyman holds his vestments.

The right window has at the top the presentation of Christ to the temple above and below the adoration of the magi.

== South aisle ==
Moving towards the Horsfall Chapel there are 5 lancet windows with depictions of five of the apostles St Bartholomew, St Philip, St James, son of Alphaeus, St Paul and St Peter.

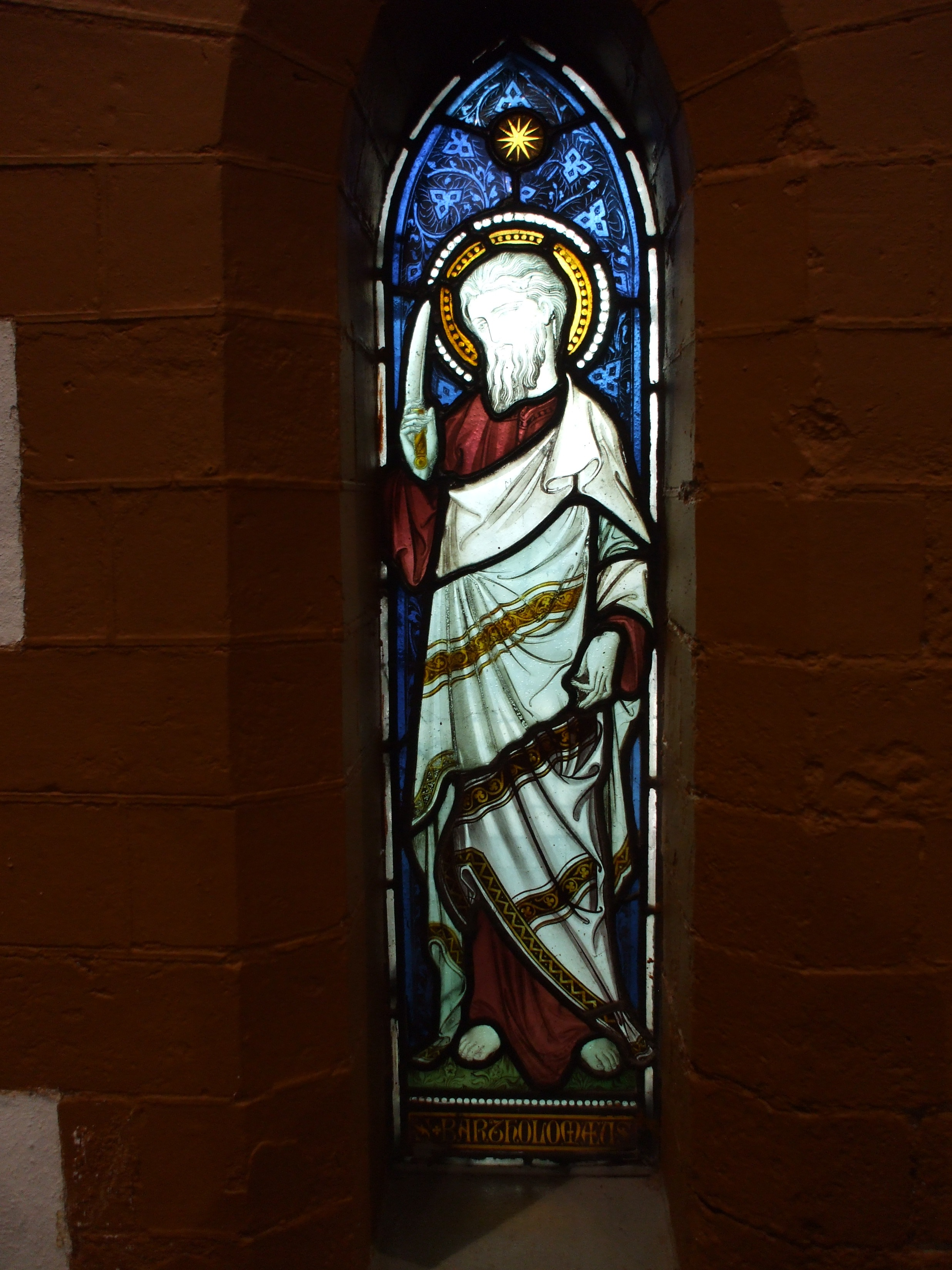
Lancet window of St Bartholemew.

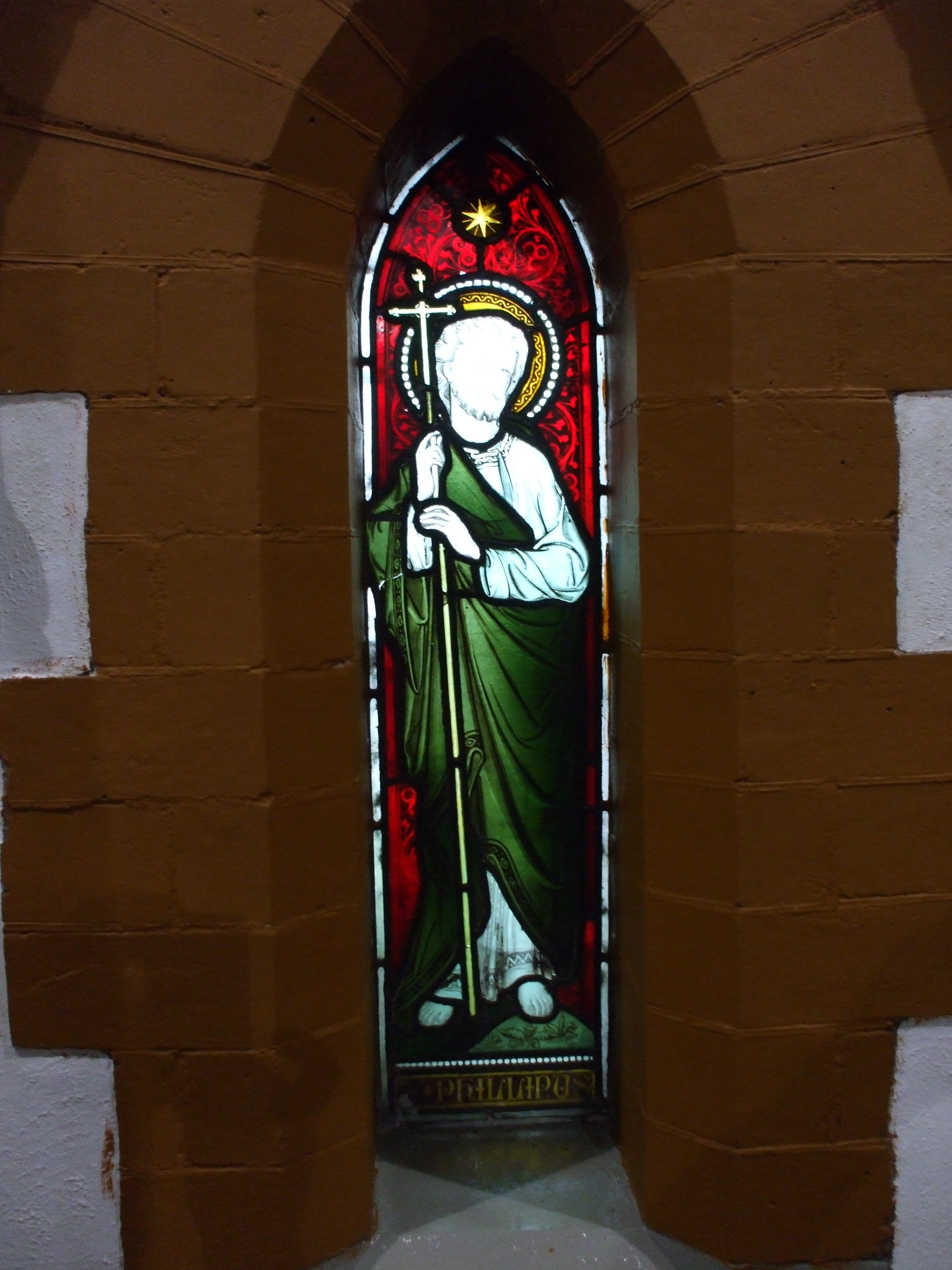
Lancet window of St Philip

== North aisle ==
Here in the lancet windows are depictions of the other 7 apostles and the Virgin Mary St Simon, St Jude, St Thomas, St Matthew, St Andrew, St James, son of Zebedee, St John, and Virgin Mary the illumination of these windows was restored in 2009 and they can now be seen in all their splendour.

== Clerestory windows ==
The North clerestory windows contain representations of female saints, while those on the South side contain their male counterparts.

== South clerestory ==
From the rear, west to east, front.

1st window

Left: St Alban, the first British Christian martyr, Centre: St George, engaged in slaying the dragon, Right: St Edmund King, King of the East Angles holding an arrow symbolic of his being shot for refusing to deny his Christian faith.

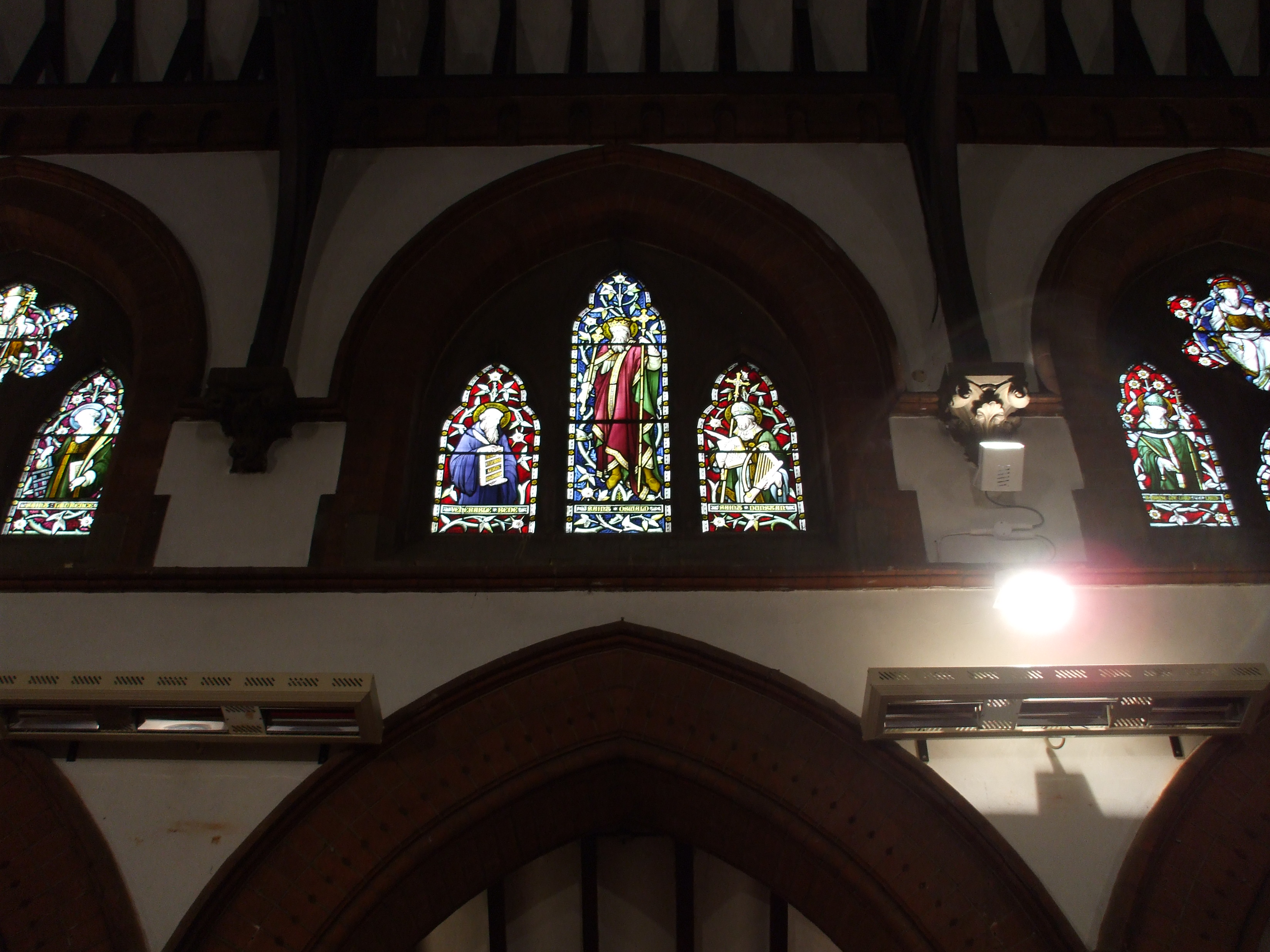
Clerestory Window depicting Venerable Bede, St Oswald and St Dunstan

2nd window

Left: St Cuthbert, holding a head in his hands, Centre: St Benedict, holding a book probably containing his Monastic Rule followed by Benedictine monks. Right: St Germanus.

3rd window

Left St Ethelbert, King who received Augustine and was converted by him,

Centre St Augustine, consecrated as Archbishop of the English and established his see at Canterbury around 598, Right St Bennet Biscop.

4th window

Left: St Cyprian, carrying the axe by which he was martyred and is recognised, Centre: St Edward the Confessor, Right: St Chad, holding in his hands the Cathedral at Lichfield which he founded and where he died in 672.

5th window

Left: Venerable Bede, holding a book symbolic of his work Ecclesiastical History of the English People, Centre: St Oswald, the first of the English royal saints, Right: St Dunstan, appointed Bishop of Worcester in 957.

6th window

Left: St Stephen, holding stones as a reminder that he was stoned to death in AD 34-35, Centre: St Gregory, wearing the triple crown of the Pope and holding open a book of chants as he reformed the services of the church. In 595 he sent Augustine to lead a mission, usually known as the Gregorian mission, to Britain to convert the pagan King Æthelberht of Kent to Christianity. Right: St Laurence, with a grid iron symbolising his martyrdom by being burned to death.

== North Clerestory ==
1st window

Left: St Bertha, Queen of Kent whose influence led to the introduction of Christianity to Anglo-Saxon England. She was canonized as a saint for her role in its establishment during that period of English history. Augustine owed much of his favorable reception to the influence of Bertha . Centre: St Helen, mother of the Emperor Constantine Right: St Margaret of Scotland wife of Malcolm III known for her goodness to the poor and orphans.

2nd window

Left: St Frideswide, holding a book as the Patron Saint of Oxford University Centre: St Walburgh, Right: St Winefride. seen holding a head as a symbol of her martyrdom.

3rd window

Left: St Edith crowned and holding a crook symbolic of her royal lineage but who chose to be a humble nun. Centre: St Hilda Abbess of Hartlepool but the glass misnames her as St Chad, probably the result of repairs following wartime damage. Right: St Etheldreda again crowned and with a crook she was abbess of Ely.

4th window

Left St Barbara crowned and with a chalice and a castle, the patron saints of artillery and dangerous trades. She was imprisoned in a tower which was broken open by a thunderbolt. Centre St Lucy with a lamp and a dish of a pair of eyes. She consecrated her virginity to God, refused to marry a pagan, and had her dowry distributed to the poor. Her would-be husband denounced her as a Christian to the governor of Syracuse, Sicily. Miraculously unable to move her or burn her, the guards took out her eyes with a fork. Patron saint of the blind her name derives from Lux meaning light. Right St Faith the grid iron symbolises her death by burning.

5th window

Left: St Cecilia Patron Saint of Music pictured with an organ Centre: St Catherine associated with the Catherine wheel on which she was tortured. Right: St Agnes with a lily the symbol of chastity.

6th window (none of the names are preceded by the title St but all are).

Left: St Dorcas raised from the dead by St Peter. Centre: St Lydia was the first recorded convert to Christianity in Europe. Right: St Lois the maternal grandmother of Timothy, she is commended by Paul for her faith here she is depicted carrying an open book in which are the words " Let thy saints rejoice in goodness".

7th window

Left: Santa Maria Mag (Mary Magdalene) with the alabaster pot containing the oil with which she anointed the feet of Jesus. Centre: St Anne mother of Mary again incorrectly named St Hilda. Right: Santa St. Elizabeth cousin of Mary and the mother of John the Baptist.

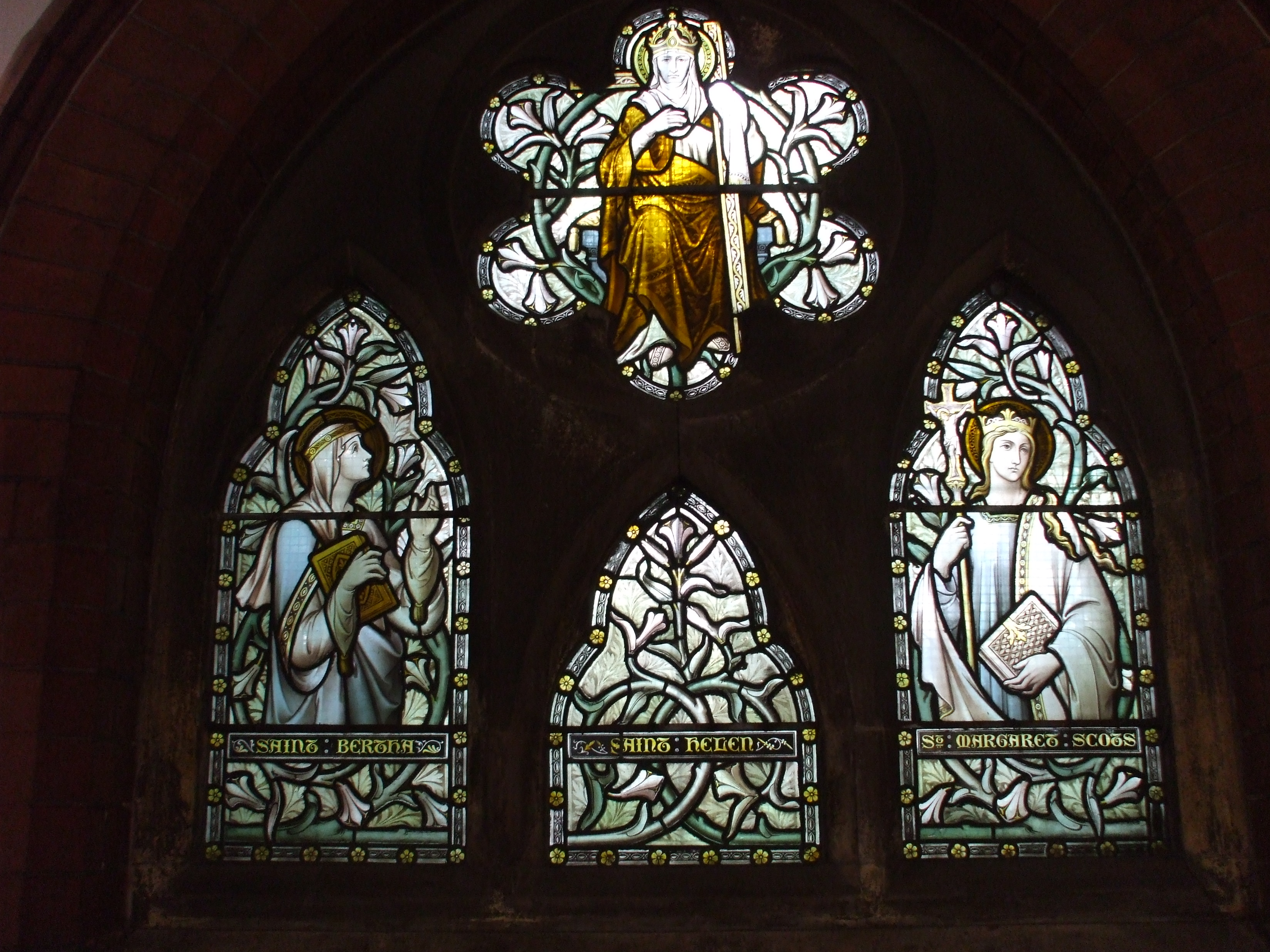
Clerestory Window in the Gallery of St Bertha St Helen and St Margaret of Scotland

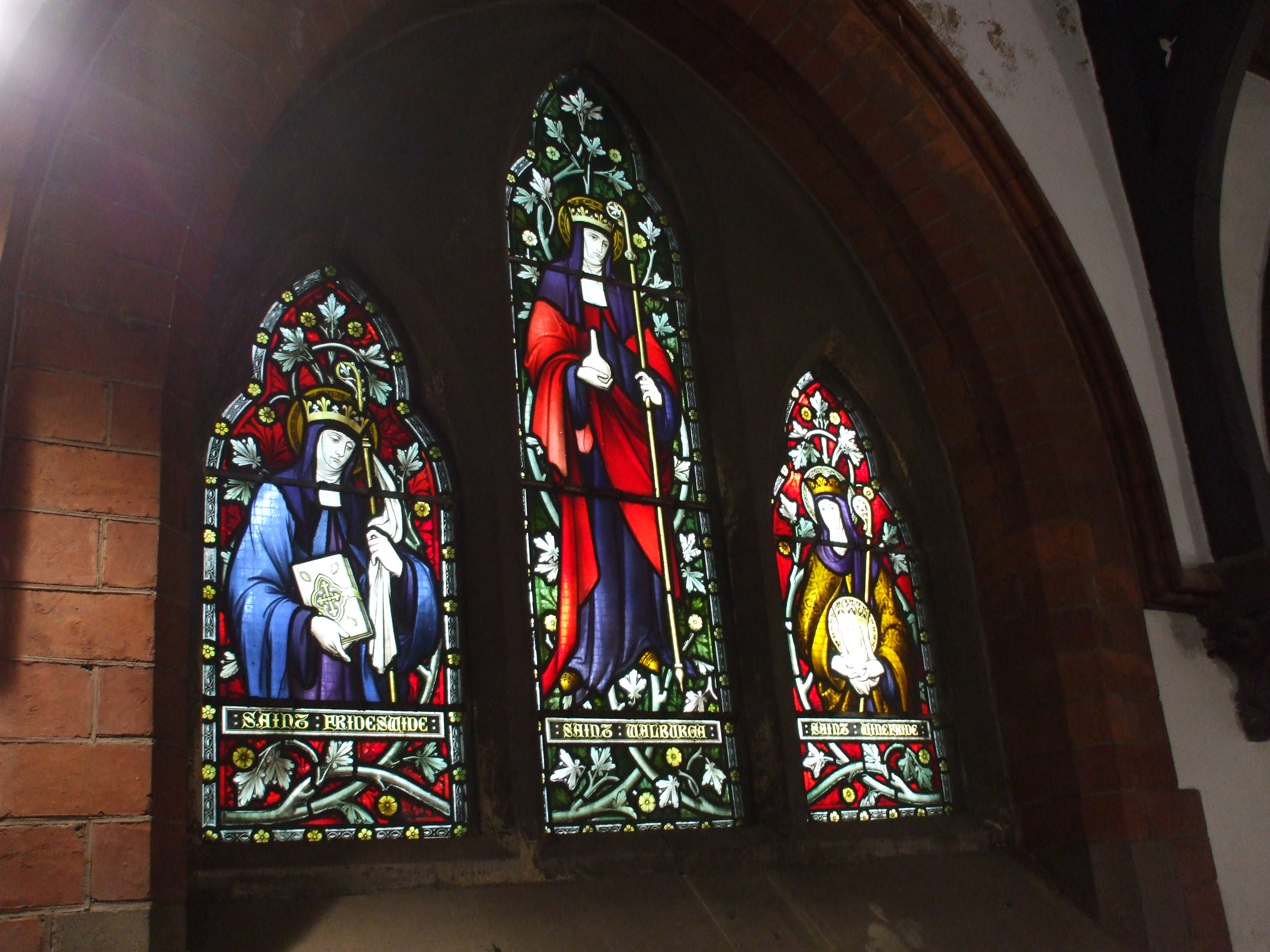
Clerestory Window showing St Frideswide, St Walburgh and St Winefride.

== Font and pulpit ==
There is also a lovely font of a white marble angel holding a large shell, by S, Ruddock, London the monument, dedicated to Horsfall's daughter, Mrs Mary Simms upon whom the face of the angel is believed to be modelled on.

The inscription upon it reads, "Erected to the memory of Mary Elizabeth Simms the only and dearly beloved daughter of James and Elizabeth Horsfall - Sept-1879. "In life beloved, in death lamented"

The pulpit is supported by three figures. One is recognizable by the key symbol he holds as St Peter, one by his dress as a Bishop as St Cyprian and the last by the symbols of a book and a broken sword as St Paul.

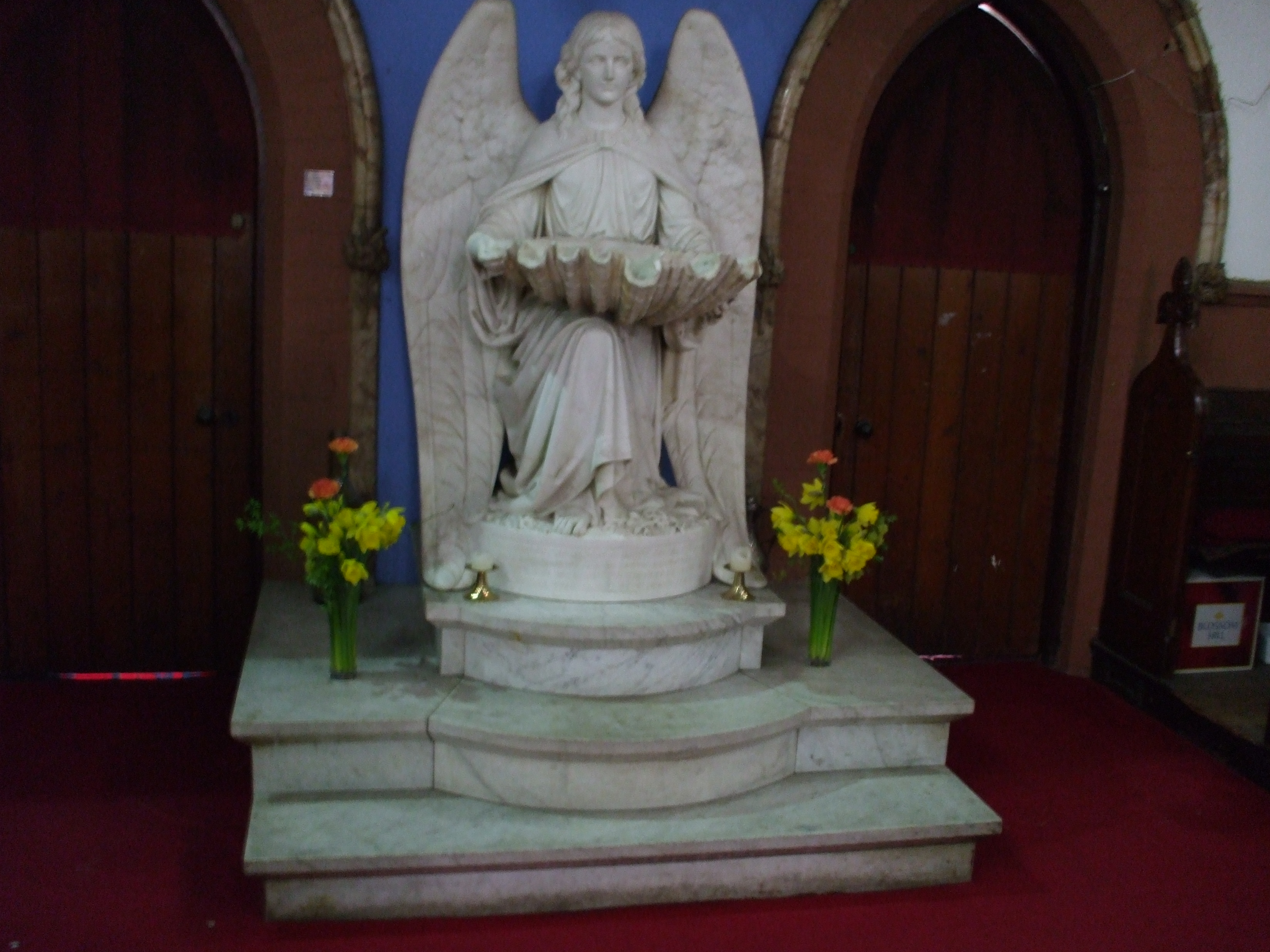
The Font at Easter

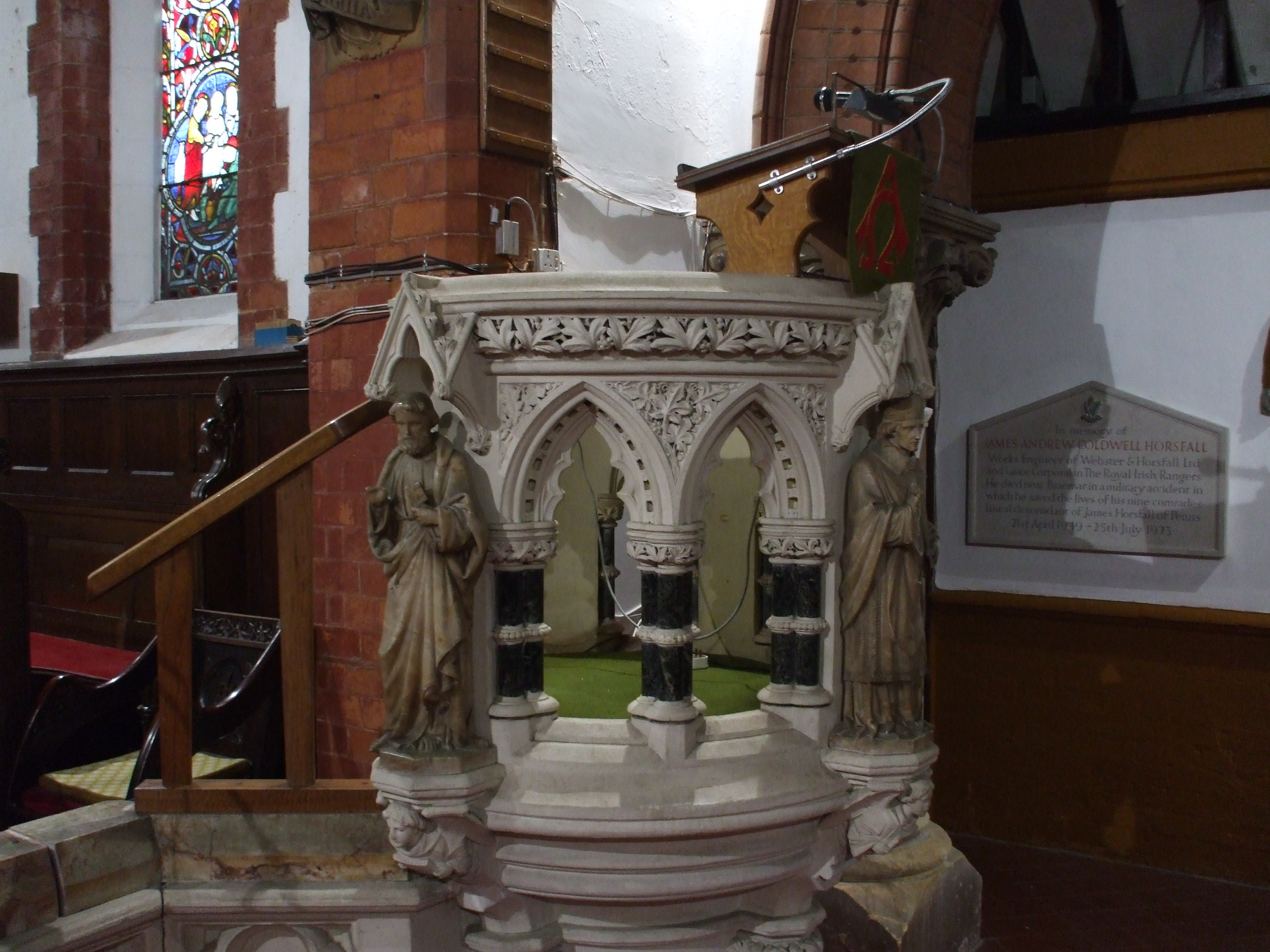
The pulpit

== Memorials ==
In the South aisle, a plain oak memorial contains 111 names, dedicated To the memory of the men of this church and Parish who laid down their lives in the Great War 1914-1918, Faithful Unto Death, another to six members of the 23rd Birmingham Company The Boys' Brigade killed during the Second World War and two memorials for members of the Horsfall family who died on military service. One to James Andrew Coldwell Horsfall, Lance Corporal Royal Irish Rangers who died in a military accident saving the lives of 9 comrades in 1973. Another to Flying Officer, George David Coldwell Horsfall, Royal Air Force, who went missing from operations over the French coast on the night of 15 May 1944.

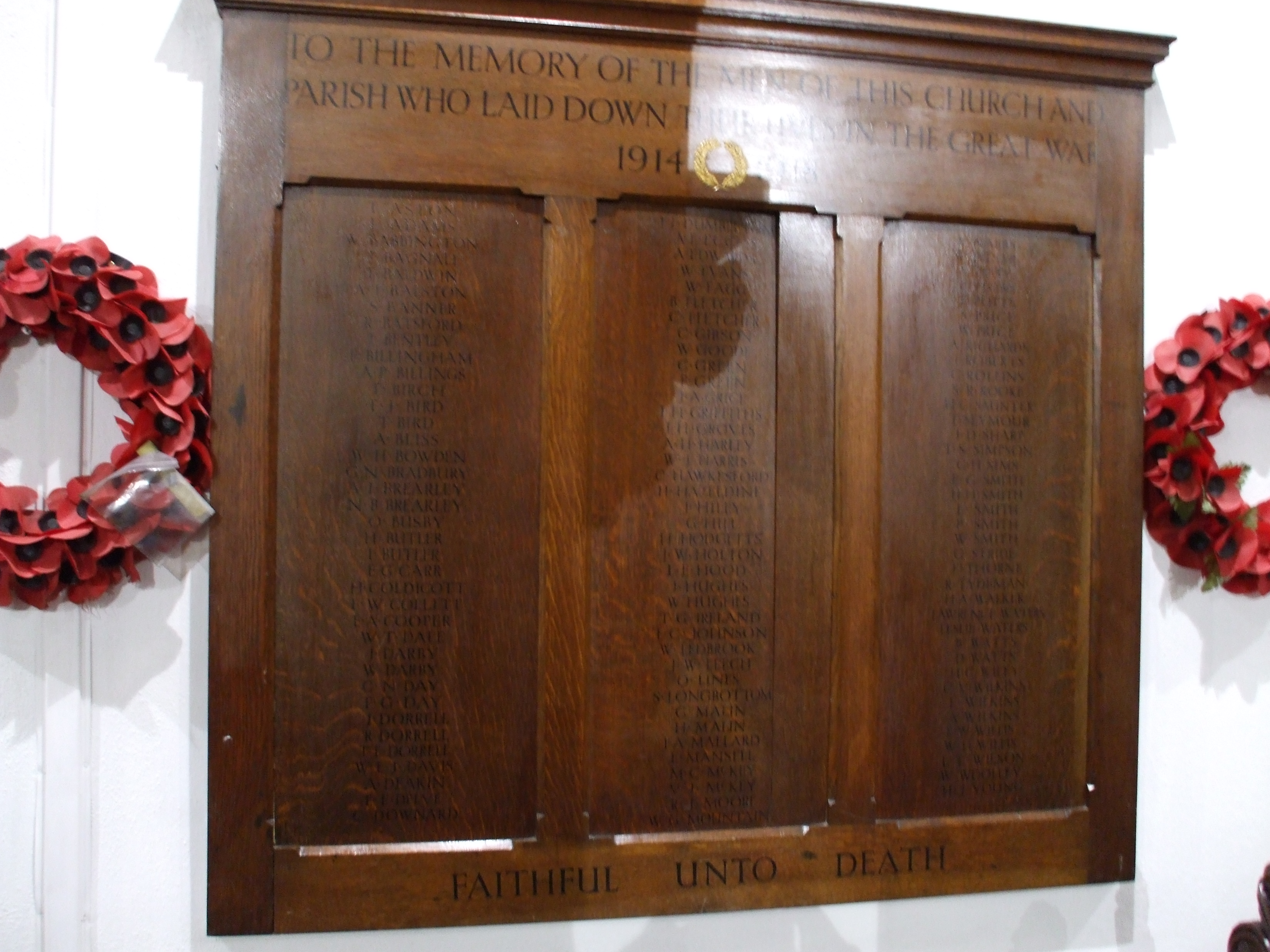
First World War memorial

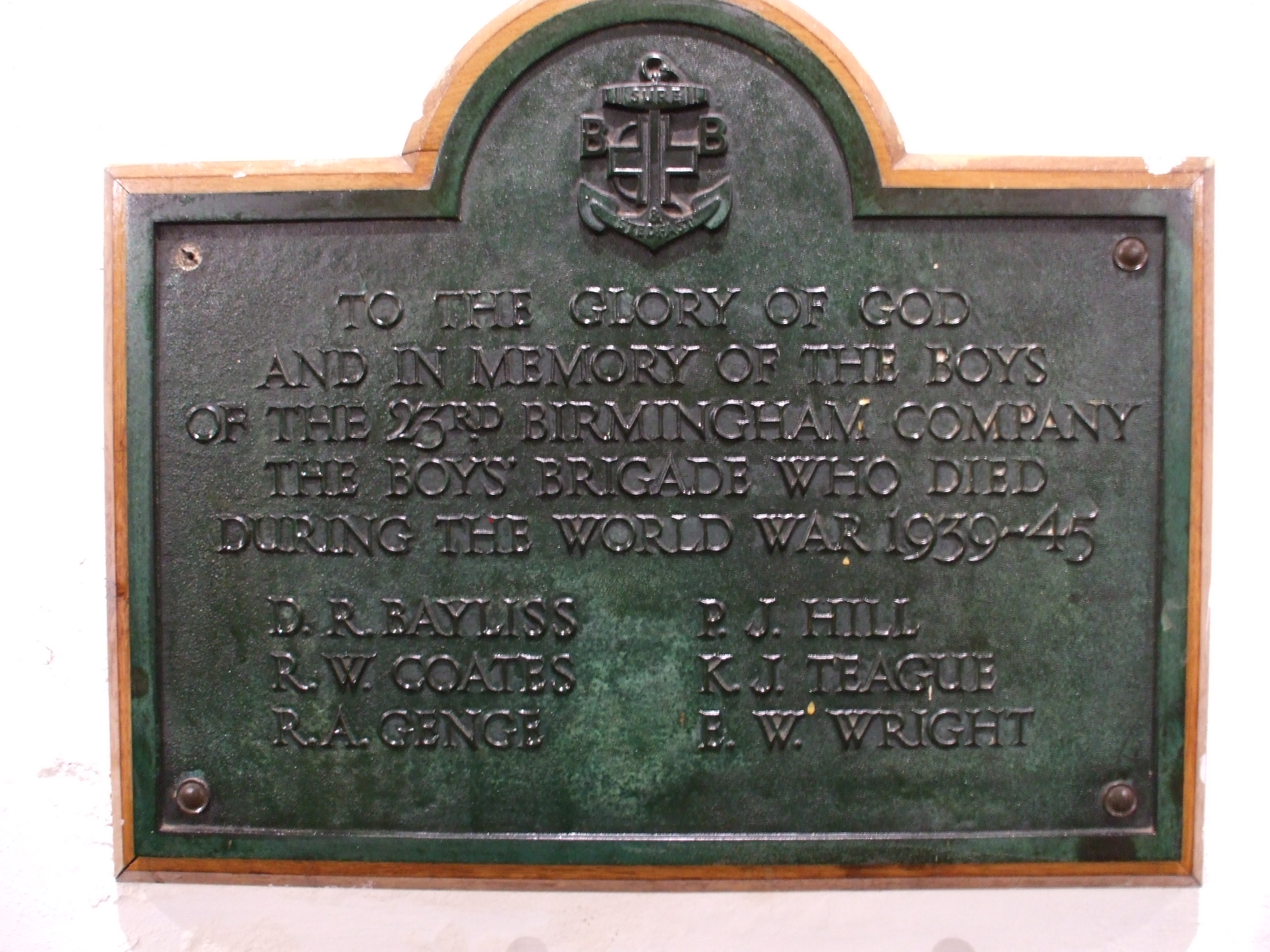
Boys' Brigade Memorial

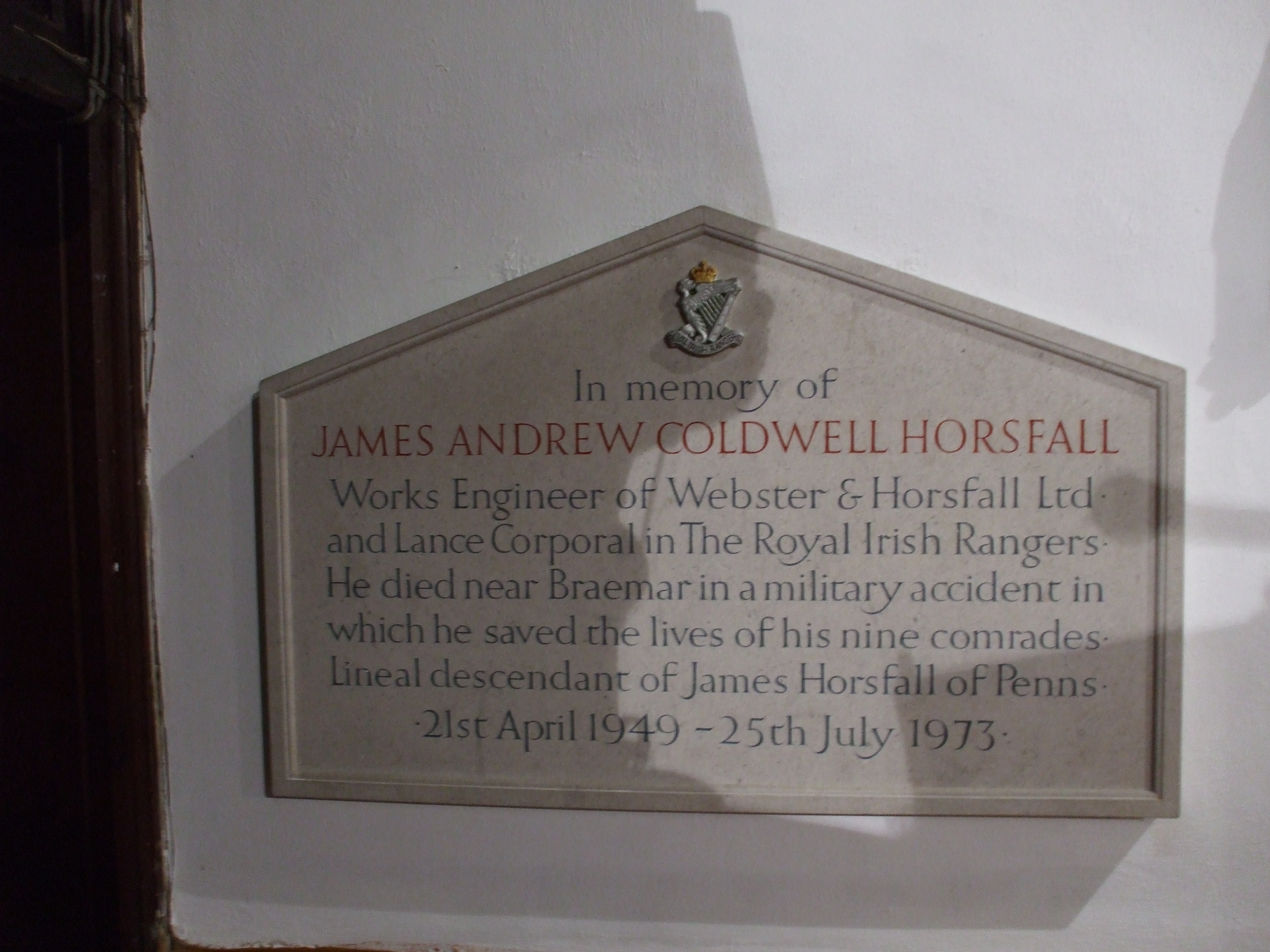
Memorial to James Andrew Coldwell Horsfall

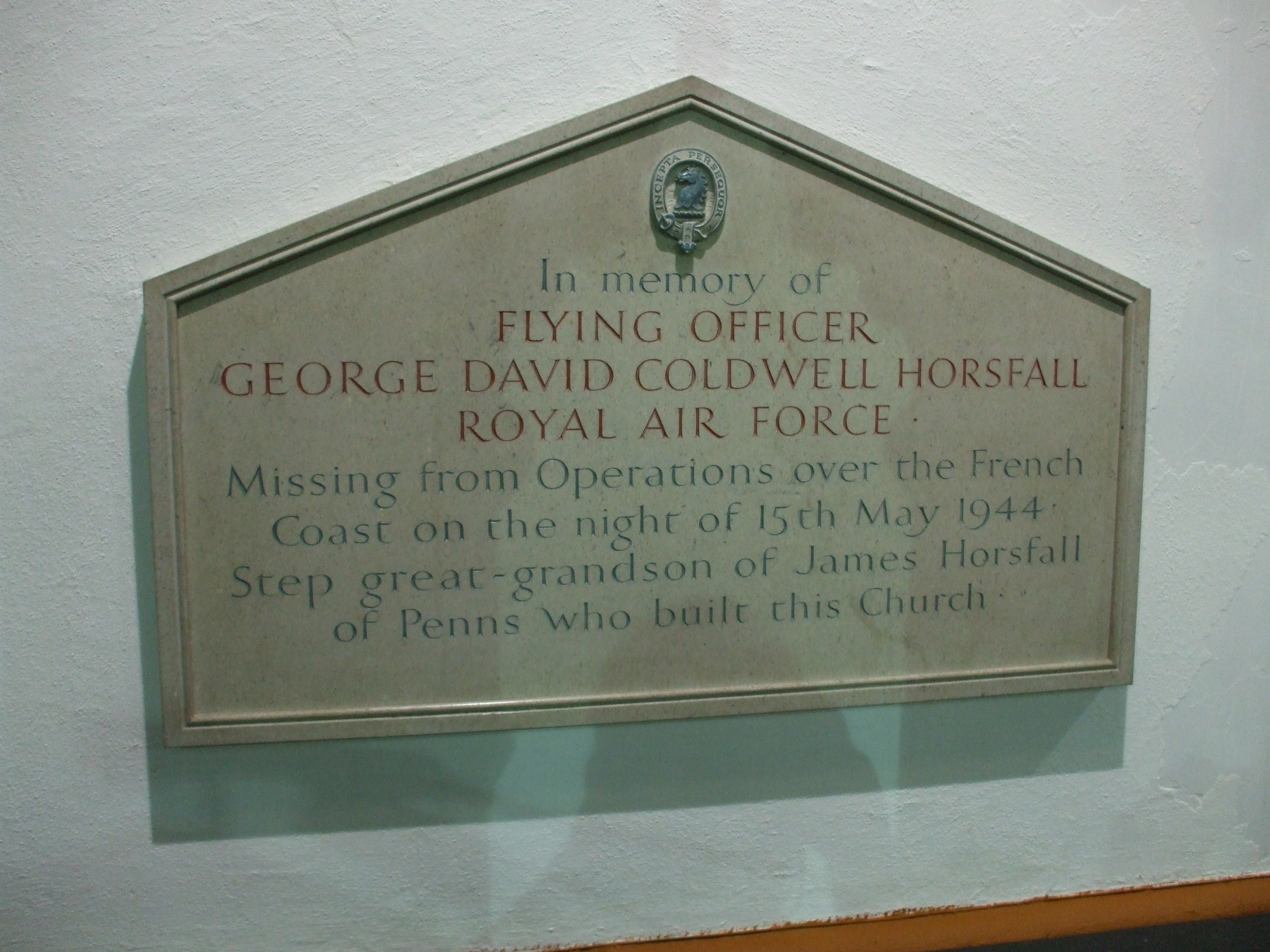
Memorial to George David Coldwell Horsfall

There are also two brass plate memorials here

Beneath the lancet window of St Jacobus (James, son of Alphaeus)

- In remembrance of William George Gray died February 2, 1860, aged 55 and of Hannah relict of the above died March 21, 1871. May they rest in peace.

Beneath the lancet window of St Paulus (St Paul)

- In memory of James Evans died January 5, 1870, Honara his first wife died March 8, 1863, and Mary Ann his second wife died March 3, 1870.

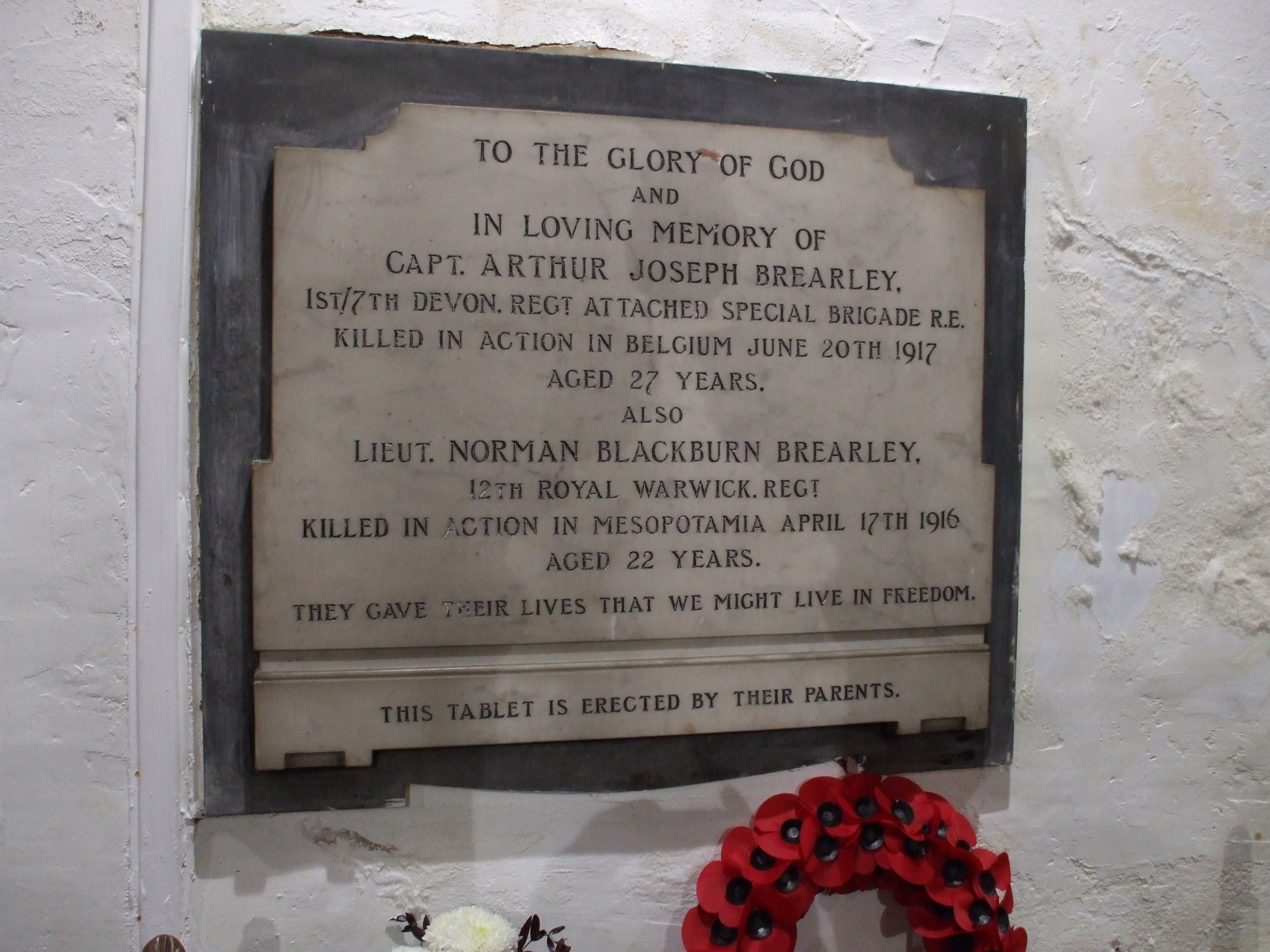
Memorial to the Brearley Brothers

Situated in the North aisle is a private First World War Memorial to Captain Joseph Arthur Brearley and his brother Norman Blackburn Brearley, son's of Harry and Annie Brearley, of 225, Charles Rd., Small Heath, Birmingham. Arthur, after being educated at King Edwards Grammar, Handsworth and Emmanuel College, Cambridge, became a schoolteacher in Exeter and joined the 1/6th Cyclists Battalion of the Devonshire Regiment in April 1914. He became attached the Special Co N Royal Engineers whose role was the firing of gas canisters onto enemy trenches. He was killed on 20 June 1917 during the Battle of Messines Ridge, and the Battalion War diary records, "Gas discharged on Jackdaw and Jam Avenue. Observations from the front line indicates that drums burst well and a good cloud was formed over enemy trenches. Considerable hostile artillery retaliation on front line and C.T.'s. Golden rain, double red and double green lights were used extensively by the enemy. Whole operation including preparation 3 killed 11 wounded." He was 27 and had been with N company just over a month. His brother, Norman Blackburn Brearley was with A company, 9th Battalion Royal Warwickshire Regiment and was killed in action on 19 April 1916. The battalion War Diary records at 0700 whilst attacking a Turkish Trench at Beit aiessa, on the right hand bank of the Tigris. He was seen to be hit during the charge and fell in marshy ground, the water rose and he, and others with him, were drowned before aid could reach them. He was 22 and is commemorated on the Basra Memorial. There is the following inscription on their memorial

They died that we might live in freedom. This tablet is erected by their parents

Also in the north aisle are three brass plate memorials to the Spawforth family.

- Edward Spawforth died August 1, 1853, aged 75 beneath the lancet window of the St Jacobus maj (James the Just)
- John Spawforth died October 28, 1865, aged 58 beneath the lancet window of St Joannes (St John)
- Mary the wife of Edward Spawforth died September 17, 1859, aged 60 placed beneath the lancet window of the Virgin Mary.

== Vicars ==
=== List of vicars ===
To the rear of the church there is a wooden board containing a list of the vicars of St Cyprian's placed there in 1973 to mark the centenary of the church.

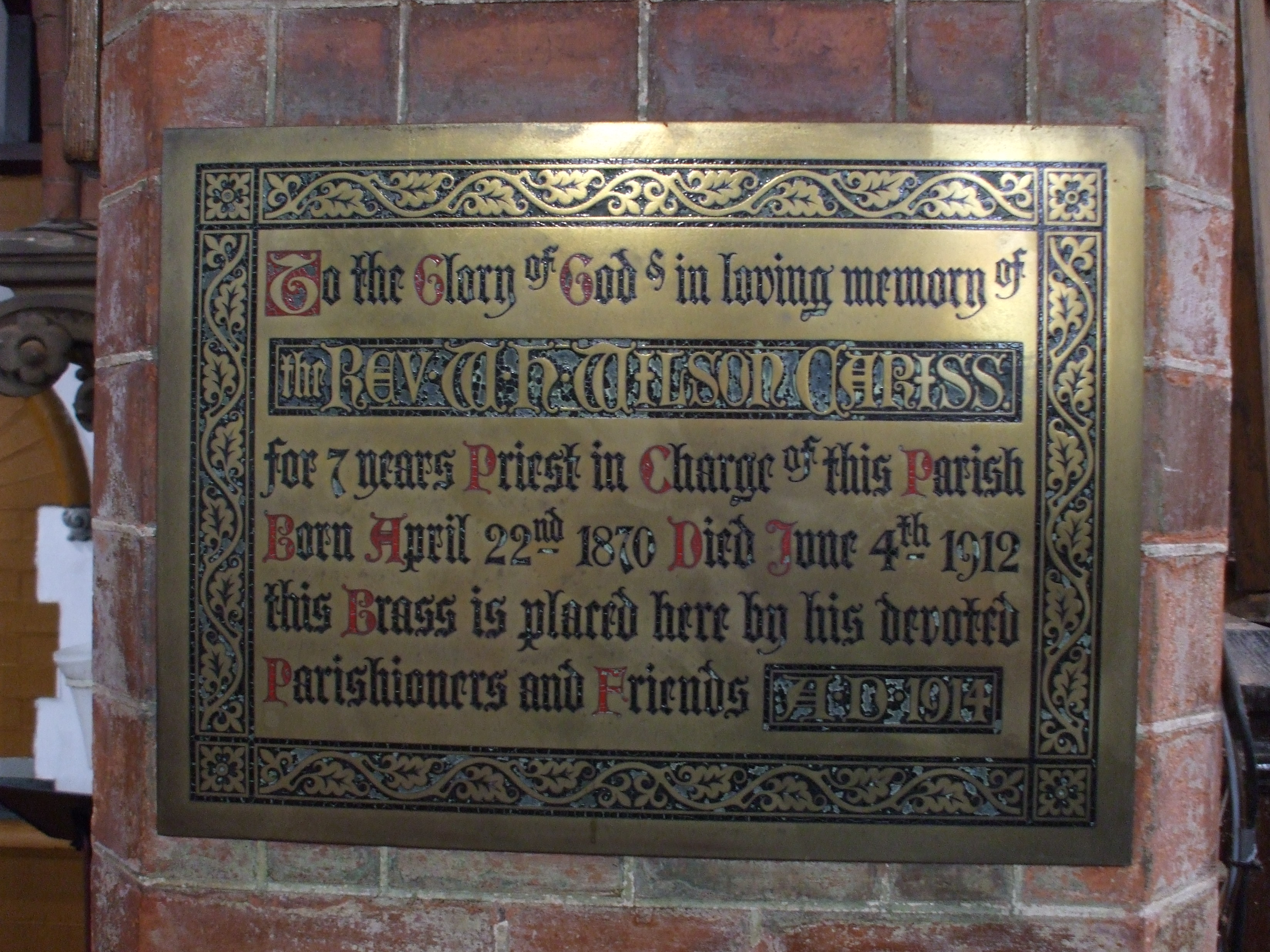
Brass Memorial to Revd. W.H Wilson Carriss

- 1866–1903 G.H. Simms (Husband of the Horsfalls daughter Mary, interred in the mortuary chapel)
- 1904–1910 W.H. Wilson Carriss (There is also a brass tablet in his memory on the left pillar of the chancel arch.)
- 1911–1912 W.F. Clarke
- 1913–1923 R.E. Price
- 1924–1927 H.E. Key
- 1928–1934 T.H.W. Maxfield
- 1935–1945 R.C. Tait
- 1946–1951 C.G. Challenger
- 1953–1964 E.F.S. Wilmot
- 1965–1980 A.C.D. Fennell
- 1988–1988 C.S. Simms
- 1988–1994 R.C. Simpson
- 1994–1996 R.E. Chamberlain
- 1996–2001 M. Alderson (First female minister)
- Interregnum, a Lay Pastoral Team was commissioned, the first Parish in the diocese to achieve this
- 2005–2010 A.P. Johnson
- 2010–2011 Interregnum with a Lay Pastoral Team
- 2012–2017 R. Anetts
- 2017– Interregnum with a Lay Pastoral Team

== Organ ==
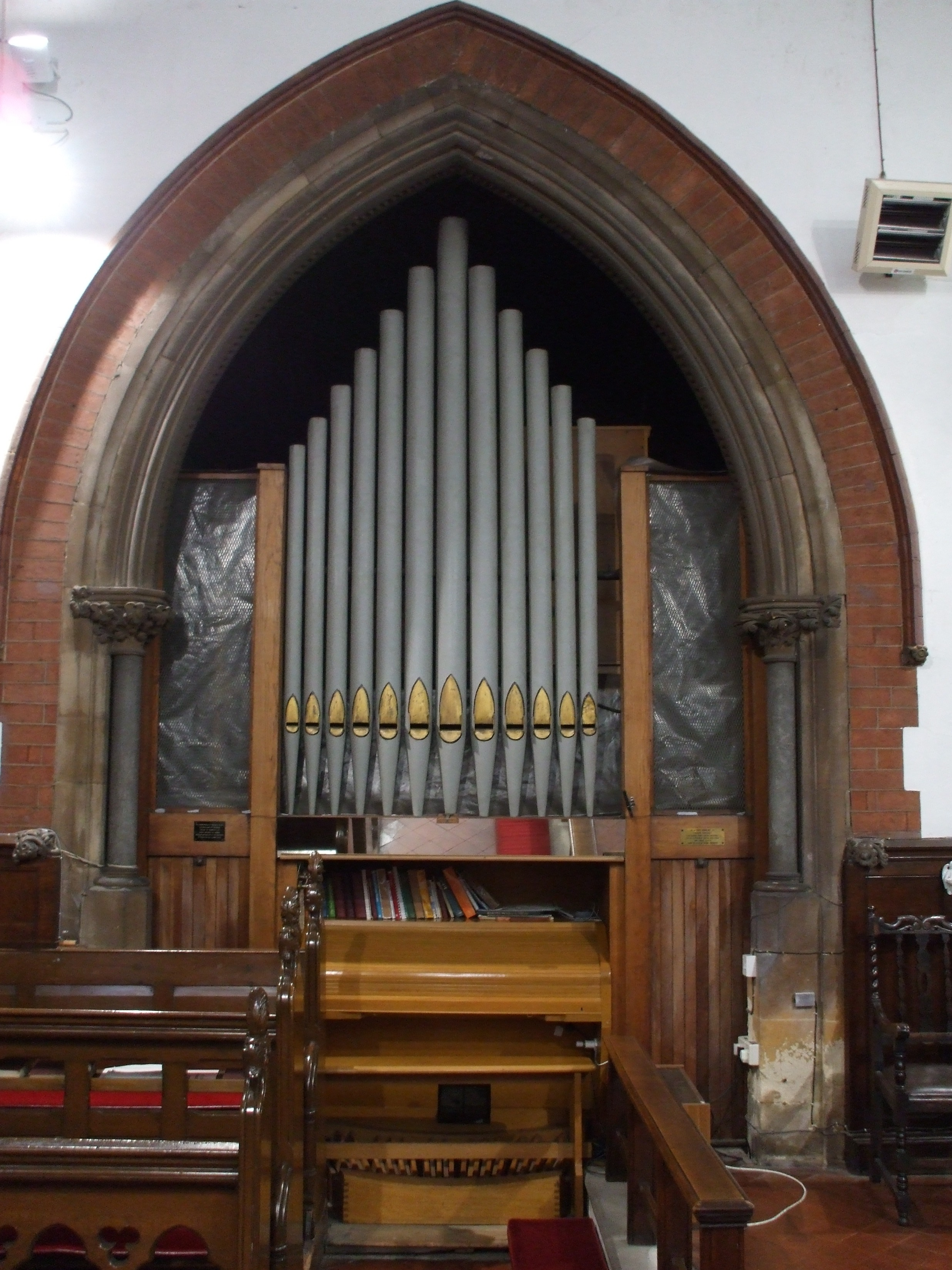
The Organ

The church formerly contained an organ by Bryceson, the specifications of which can be found on the National Pipe Organ Register. However, this was replaced in the 1960s with an electronic organ by Compton. It bears a plaque with the following inscription "To commemorate with grateful thanks the rebuilding of this organ through the generosity of church members and friends. Also the restoration of the woodwork by Alan Pipe and Albert Dixon."

=== List of organists ===
- Samuel Simms 1879–1885 (formerly organist of St. John's Church, Ladywood)
- Samuel Simms 1885–???? (succeeded his father)
- Bertram Newstead ca. 1925
- F. G. Ashmore 1935
- F. W. Grove 1952
- H. Summerton 1965 (Deputy Mrs F. Cooper)
- Derek Hulley 1970–2005 (a memorial plate on right side of the organ reads) "In loving memory of Derek Hulley Organist and Choirmaster of St Cyprians 1970–2005 and wife Joyce, Rest in Peace Dear Friends"
- Margaret Croucher 2000-to present

== Present activities ==
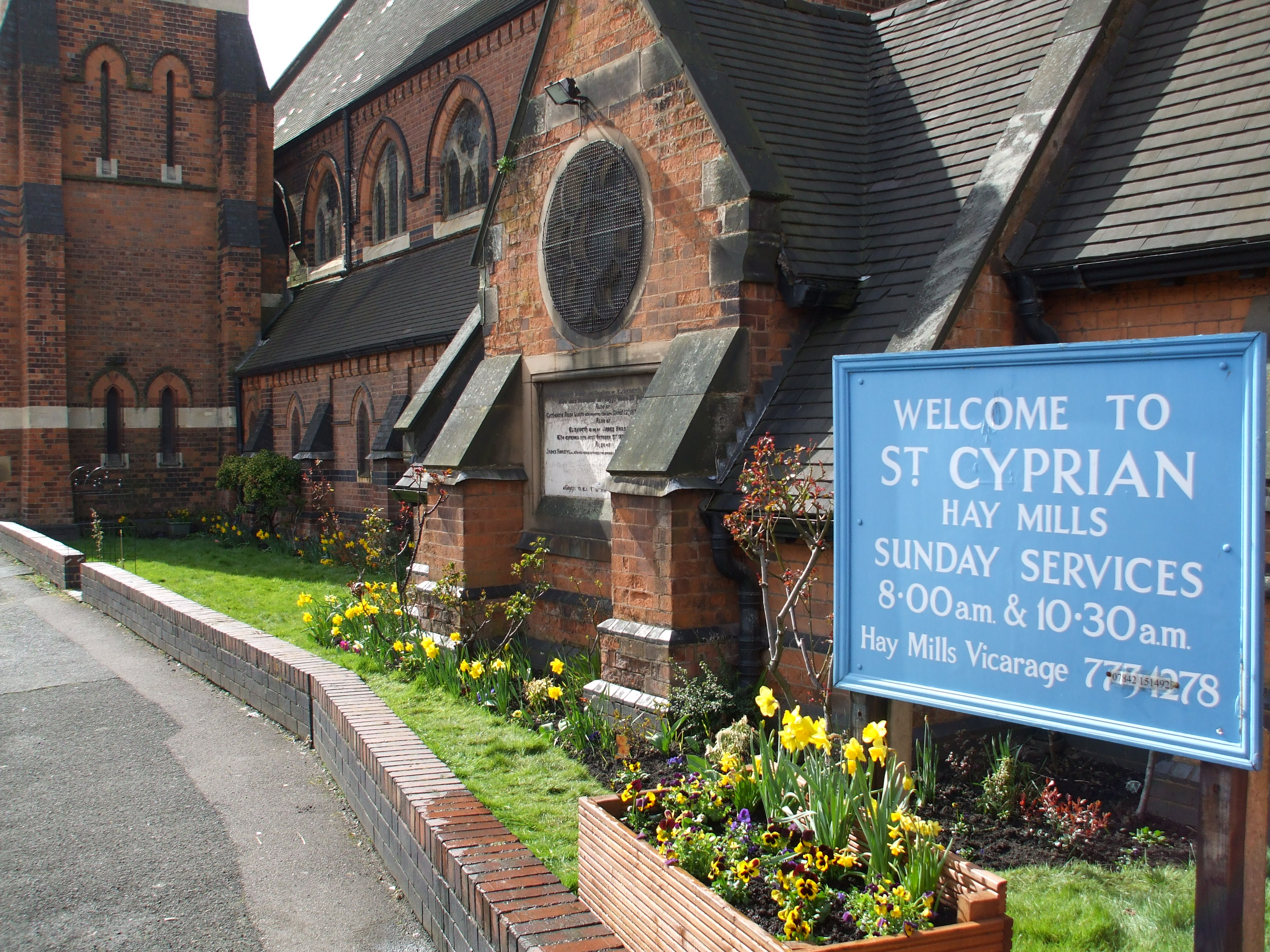
The restored garden, Easter 2010

St Cyprian's remains open and has an active congregation contributing to missions in Africa and elsewhere. Anglican services of Holy Communion will be presided at by the Vicar Rev. Roy Anetts at 8.00am and 10:30 am on Sunday with other regular events throughout the week including the "Grapevine" Ladies Group, Bible Study Group and Morning prayers.

Special events are organised throughout the year such as Bingo afternoons, concerts in the church, day retreat visits to a local convent and a history day organised in May saw over 100 visitors to the church.

St Cyprians has a modern church hall, situated nearby available for hire, which is also used by religious groups of different faiths.

A small memorial garden in front of the church which was renovated and replanted by volunteers from the congregation during the summer of 2009 and blessed by the retiring vicar Tony Johnson in April 2010.

== Sources ==
- National Archives:
- (WO/95/402) Royal Engineers Battalion War Diary
- (WO374/8744) Service Record Capt. Arthur Brearley
- (WO/374)Service Record of Lt Norman Blackburn Brearley
