= Willie Sims =

Willie Sims may refer to:

- Willie Sims (footballer) (born 1984), Guatemalan soccer player
- Willie Sims (basketball) (born 1958), American-Israeli retired basketball player

== See also ==
- Willie Simms (1870–1927), American thoroughbred horse racing jockey
- William Sims (disambiguation)
