= Frederick Simms =

Frederick Simms may refer to:

- Frederick Richard Simms (1863–1944), British engineer and businessman
- Frederick Walter Simms (1803–1865), British civil engineer
- Fred Simms (1929–1997), Australian rules footballer
