= George Pike England =

British organ builder

George Pike England (ca.1765 – February 1815) was an English organ builder who was among the most prominent in England during the late 18th and early 19th centuries.

== Life ==
He was the son of organ builder George England and Mary Blasdale. He married Ann Wilson on 13 October 1789 in St Pancras parish church. He was buried at St Andrew's, Holborn, after his death in February 1815.

== Career ==
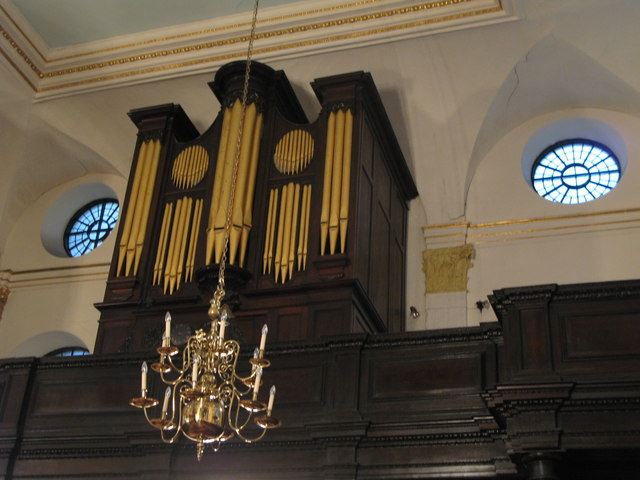
St Margaret Lothbury 1801

He left a list of the organs he built in an extant account book. They are those of:

- St. George's Chapel; Portsmouth Common, 1788
- St James's Church, Clerkenwell, and Fetter Lane Chapel, 1790
- Adelphi Chapel, 1791
- Gainsborough Church, Lincolnshire, 1793
- Newington Church, Surrey, and Blandford Forum Church, 1794
- St Peter's, Carmarthen, 1796
- St Margaret Lothbury, 1801
- Sardinian Embassy Chapel, Lincoln's Inn, London, 1802 (demolished)
- Church of St. Mary Magdalene, Newark-on-Trent, Nottinghamshire, 1803
- Sheffield Parish Church, St. Philip's, Birmingham, and St Martin Outwich, 1805
- Hinckley Parish Church, 1808
- St Thomas' Church, Stourbridge; Richmond, Yorkshire; Lancaster Priory, 1809
- Shiffnall, Salop, and Ulverston, 1811
- St Mary's Church, Islington, 1812

The 1809 organ at St Mary the Virgin, Bishops Cannings, Wiltshire is also attributed to him.

England built an organ for Salisbury Cathedral which proved to be insufficiently powerful, and in 1792 was reinstalled in St Denys' Church, Warminster, Wiltshire. Its organ case is described by Pevsner as "a delightful piece".

For a short while before his death, Joseph William Walker (1802–1870) was apprenticed to him. Walker later founded the company of J. W. Walker & Sons Ltd.
