= Henry Taylor (organist) =

Henry Taylor FRCO (born 1859) was an organist and composer based in England.

== Life ==
He was born in 1859 in Derby, the son of Joseph Taylor and Elizabeth Holbrook. He married Anne Maria, and they had the following children

- Charles Henry Taylor b. 1886
- George Harold Taylor b. 1888

In 1886, he was elected a Fellow of the Birmingham and Midland Musical Guild. In 1892 he received the degree of Mus Bac from Cambridge University.

== Appointments ==
- Assistant Organist of Ripon Cathedral 1876–81
- Organist of Church of Christ the Consoler Skelton-cum-Newby 1876–81
- Organist of St John's Church, Ladywood Birmingham 1881–1903
- Organist of St Bartholomew's Church, Edgbaston Birmingham 1903– ????

== Compositions ==
His compositions included works for choir and organ.
