= Eric Simms =

Eric Simms may refer to:

- Eric Simms (rugby league) (born 1945), Australian rugby league footballer
- Eric Simms (ornithologist) (1921–2009), English ornithologist, naturalist, writer, broadcaster and conservationist
