= William L. Sims II =

William Lee Sims, II (October 17, 1896 – April 29, 1977) was an American businessman, farmer, and philanthropist.

== Early life and education ==
William "Bill" Lee Sims, II was born on October 17, 1896, to Wythe Davis Sims and Addie Sousley Sims in Birmingham, Alabama. He attended Elyton School and Central High School in Birmingham. After his freshman year his parents sent him to East Aurora, New York to be part of the inaugural class at the Roycroft School of Life for Boys, founded by his father's friends Elbert Hubbard and Alice Moore Hubbard.

When Sims returned to Alabama in 1913 he worked for his father's advertising agency, but had little interest in the work. His father bought 80 acres of land for Sims to farm in Eden, Alabama; Sims named it "The Garden of Eden". Sims attended Auburn University, then known as Alabama Polytechnic Institute, from 1916 to 1918. Sims later received an honorary Doctorate of Humanities from Auburn University in 1968. He was a member of the Wirt Literary Society and played varsity baseball and basketball. His education was cut short by World War I; he served in the U.S. Army and was stationed at Camp Gordon near Augusta, Georgia.

In addition to his father's influence, Sims was greatly encouraged by his father's oldest brother, William L. "Will" Sims. This uncle was an executive for various firms over time including Sloss Furnace, Empire State Iron & Steel, Jefferson Iron Co., and Anniston Rolling Mills. Sims' father Wythe D. Sims was also a vice president at that Anniston, AL, firm. The wider family also carried on a tradition of achievement. Sims' uncle John L. Sims II, a lawyer, was hired in 1904 as personal secretary and clerk for Judge David Davie Shelby of the United States Court of Appeals for the Fifth Circuit and the United States Circuit Courts for the Fifth Circuit. Sims' youngest uncle was Dr. Archer Sims. Sims' father Wythe was also a first cousin of Howard Lee McBain. Sims was an uncle of William Sims Thurman.

== Career ==
Sims began his career with Colgate-Palmolive Company in 1924, first as a salesman. He quickly rose through the ranks and in 1927 was sent to Milan, Italy to establish the Italian branch of the company. In March of 1927, Sims headed to Milan via Paris, accompanied by his wife, sister, and 8-month-old son, Wythe. In April of 1927, Sims founded the Italian subsidiary of Palmolive, starting in the Touring Hotel in Milan. Products were initially imported from the US, but eventually local third parties were contracted. In 1930 he became the Continental Sales and Advertising Manager for the European branch, headquartered in Paris. He spent ten years in Paris, before returning to New Jersey as the assistant to the Edward H. Little, Colgate-Palmolive President.

From 1943 to 1944 Sims served as the head of Drugs and Chemical Unit at the Office of Price Administration in Washington, DC. He returned to Colgate-Palmolive as the Vice President of Foreign Operations in 1945. He later became the first President of Colgate-Palmolive International (1952) and was elected President of the Colgate-Palmolive Company in July 1955.

Sims retired from the company in March 1957 after 33 years of service. He returned to Orlando, Florida, where he and his family maintained a home for many years at his grove. His wife Kathleen named the residence Val Fleuri, after a residence they had inhabited in Paris. Once back in Florida he returned his focus to his farming roots. His uncle Will had recommended Sims make investments in central Florida real estate starting with the late 1920's boom and Sims had acquired grove property in Orange County and, later, in Lake County, and established Sims Groves, Inc. Sims Groves was a Gold sponsor of the Citrus Open for several years from 1965.

He remained active in his retirement, engaging in a variety of civic, charitable, and business investment activities. In 1959, as chairman of the board, Sims was part of Electronic Development Corp., a start-up established to produce specialized electronics for the defense industry. Types of equipment in their operational plans included those related to missile guidance, missile tracking, R&D, and industrial electronics.

Sims served as a founding member and Secretary-Treasurer of the St. Augustine Historical Restoration and Preservation Commission from 1959 to 1969, appointed by Governor LeRoy Collins. He was also a member of the executive committee of the Auburn Alumni Association, a trustee of the Auburn University Foundation, a trustee for the Ringling School of Art, and served as the director of the Orlando Art Association (Loch Haven Art Center), the Loch Haven Park Board, and the Florida National Bank at Orlando.

== Personal life ==
Sims married Kathleen Wilkes on June 26, 1923, in Birmingham, AL, in the studio of Miss Sara "Saddie" Mallam. Kathleen Wilkes was a graduate of Alabama Girls' Technical Institute at Montevallo. She was the daughter of William Henderson Wilkes (1864-1916), an L&N Railroad conductor, and his wife Annie Eliza McKoin; both originally from Tennessee. Sims and his bride had first met and gotten to know each other at Miss Mallam's studio while taking vocal lessons and performing musicals. Miss Mallam was the sister-in-law of Sims' namesake uncle Will. Miss Mallam was a Birmingham socialite originally from New Orleans. She was a trained vocalist who gave singing lessons and produced public performances by herself and her students.

Sims and his wife had three children, Wythe Davis Sims, II, William Lee “Billy” Sims III, and Betty Kathleen Sims. Billy died of childhood leukemia at age 7 in Paris in 1935. Wythe drowned in Winter Park, FL, in 1970. Sims died in Orlando on April 29, 1977, at the age of 80. His wife Kathleen died five months later at age 79. Their daughter Betty died at age 92 in 2024.

Sims loved the fact that he met Will Rogers on an Air France flight in 1934, from Belgrade to Bucharest, and got to talk with him at length. He said Will Rogers called him “Alabama” as was Rogers' practice of referring to people by where they were from.

Sims was a member of many avocational associations, including the University Club of Orlando, the American Club of London, the American Club of Paris, the Newcomen Society in North America, the Blue Lodge, the Shriners, the Scottish Rite (32nd degree), and the Academy of Political Science. He was an avid golfer and was a member of many golf clubs around the world.

Sims donated $27,000 to the St. Augustine Historical Restoration and Preservation Commission to reconstruct a colonial silversmith shop. Census records from 1780 showed that a silversmith named William Sims had worked in St. Augustine; this connection gave Sims interest in seeing it rebuilt. Today the Sims Silversmith Shop still stands, but operates as retail space.

In 1966, Sims pledged $25,000 for the expansion of Loch Haven Art Center (renamed as the Orlando Museum of Art in 1986). In 1975, Sims donated about $30,000 worth of Colgate-Palmolive stock to pay off the $26,504.85 mortgage of the Loch Haven Art Center. In 1972, Sims donated $8000 to the Ringling School of Arts Kimbrough scholarship loan fund.
