= Richard Simms =

Louisiana reconstruction era American politician

Louisiana House of Representatives
- In office 1872–1874

Louisiana House of Representatives
- In office 1876–1878

Louisiana State Senate
- In office 1880–1892

Louisiana House of Representatives
- In office 1892–1894

Personal details
- Party: Republican

Richard Simms was an American state legislator who served in the Louisiana House of Representatives and the Louisiana State Senate during the Reconstruction era.

== Biography ==
Simms was first elected to represent the St. Landry Parish in the Louisiana House of Representatives from 1872 until 1874.

At the 1874 and 1876 Republican State Conventions he represented St. James Parish along with four other delegates from the parish. In 1876 he was working as sheriff for the Parish of St. James.

He was elected again to the Louisiana House of Representatives to serve from 1876 until 1878, this time representing St. James Parish.

Approaching the end of the session in October 1878 he again ran for the position of parish sheriff, but lost out coming second to Victor Miles. He was a member of the State Central Executive Committee of the Republican Party of Louisiana in 1879 when P. B. S. Pinchback was president.

Simms was nominated to run on the Republican ticket for State Senator in a long and "stormy session" at the Republican Senatorial Convention October 15, 1879. He was one of two nominations the other being G. H. Hill and the first fifty-three ballots were deadlocked and on the fifty-fourth ballot he succeeded by eight to seven. Simms was then elected to serve in the Louisiana State Senate for three session from 1880 until 1892.

He along with the other four black senators voted against a bill put forth by Charles Parlange in 1884 to put convicts to work on levees and to break the current lease of the prison.

Simms again returned to the Louisiana House of Representatives in 1892 representing St. James Parish and presumed to have served until 1894.

In 1896 Simms was a delegate to the Eleventh Republican National Convention in St. Louis representing the central district.

== See also ==
- African American officeholders from the end of the Civil War until before 1900

== Notes ==
- In some of the contemporary newspaper articles his name was given as Richard Simmes, including the reporting of his nomination on the Republican ticket for the senate.
