= Samuel Simms the elder =

Samuel Simms (1784 – 1868) was an English organist and composer.

== Background ==
He was born in 1784, the son of John Simms (1744 - 1824) and his wife, Latitia Rogers. Samuel Simms was esteemed one of the finest organists of his time, and many of his siblings held musical posts in the Midlands.

In 1805 he was a candidate for the post of organist at St. Alkmund's Church, Whitchurch, Shropshire, but the conditions were so unsatisfactory that only three of those assembled would compete. He finally settled at St Thomas’ Church, Stourbridge, and held the position for half a century until his death.

In 1863 there was an attempt to force him to resign on a pension of £15 (equivalent to £1,629 in 2025) per annum, at the instigation of the either the minister or some of the congregation. The exact complaint against him is not substantiated, but suggested to be related to the performance of his duties. He did however, command support from former pupils who rose to his defence.

His son, Samuel Simms (1836-1885) succeeded him at Stourbridge.

== Appointments ==
- Organist of St Thomas' Church, Stourbridge 1809 - 1868

== Compositions ==
His compositions included organ and pianoforte pieces.
