= Matt Simms =

Matt Simms may refer to:

- Matt Simms (American football), American quarterback
- Matt Simms (musician), guitarist with Wire
