= Harry Simms (cricketer) =

English cricketer

Personal information
- Full name: Harry Lester Simms
- Born: 31 January 1888; Adelaide, South Australia, Australia
- Died: 9 June 1942 (aged 54); Oatlands, Surrey, England
- Batting: Right-handed
- Bowling: Right-arm fast
- Relatives: Royston Simms (brother)

Domestic team information
- Years: Team
- 1921–1922: Warwickshire
- 1912: Marylebone Cricket Club
- 1909/10–1916/17: Europeans (India)
- 1905–1913: Sussex

Career statistics
Competition	First-class
Matches	110
Runs scored	3,154
Batting average	17.92
100s/50s	1/11
Top score	126
Balls bowled	8,440
Wickets	220
Bowling average	19.47
5 wickets in innings	12
10 wickets in match	–
Best bowling	7/84
Catches/stumpings	71/–
- Source: ESPNcricinfo, 15 March 2012

Harry Lester Simms (31 January 1888 – 9 June 1942) was an English first-class cricketer. Simms was born in Adelaide, Australia but moved to England where he played cricket with Sussex from 1905 until 1913. He also played with Warwickshire and the European side based in India.

His brother, Royston, also played first-class cricket for Sussex.
