= Royston Simms =

Australian-born English cricketer

Personal information
- Full name: Royston Knox Simms
- Born: 1 January 1894; Adelaide, South Australia, Australia
- Died: 12 March 1978 (aged 84); South Petherton, Somerset, England
- Batting: Unknown
- Bowling: Unknown
- Relatives: Harry Simms (brother)

Domestic team information
- Years: Team
- 1912: Sussex

Career statistics
Competition	First-class
Matches	2
Runs scored	5
Batting average	2.50
100s/50s	–/–
Top score	4
Balls bowled	138
Wickets	2
Bowling average	32.00
5 wickets in innings	–
10 wickets in match	–
Best bowling	1/23
Catches/stumpings	–/–
- Source: Cricinfo, 15 March 2012

Royston Knox Simms (1 January 1894 – 12 March 1978) was an Australian-born English cricketer. Simms' batting and bowling styles are unknown. He was born at Adelaide, South Australia, and was educated at Lancing College.

Simms made two first-class appearances for Sussex against Oxford University and Gloucestershire in the 1912 County Championship. Against Oxford University at Cricket Field Road, Horsham, Sussex won the toss and elected to bat first, making 414 in their first-innings, during which Simms was dismissed for 4 runs by John Vidler. Oxford University made 186 in their first-innings, during which Simms bowled fourteen overs, conceding 41 runs and taking the wicket of Freddie Knott. Sussex forced Oxford University to follow-on in their second-innings, dismissing them for just 81 runs, to win by an innings and 147 runs. In his second match against Gloucestershire at the County Ground, Hove, Sussex won the toss and elected to bat first, making 352 in their first-innings, during which Simms was dismissed for a single run by Charlie Parker. Gloucestershire responded in their first-innings by making 155, during which Simms bowled nine overs, conceding 23 runs and taking the wicket of Cyril Sewell. Gloucestershire were forced to follow-on in their second-innings, with Sussex dismissing them for 151 to win the match by an innings and 46 runs.

He died at South Petherton, Somerset, on 12 March 1978. His brother, Harry, also played first-class cricket, and featured alongside Royston against Oxford University.
