= Thomas Simms =

Thomas Sims was an escaped African-American slave.

Thomas, Tommy or Tom Sim(m)s may also refer to:

- Tommy Simms (Automatic Loveletter), musician
- Tom Simms, character in Deranged (1974 film)
- Tommy Sims, bassist in White Heart
- Tommy Sims (American football) (born 1964), American football defensive back
- Tom Sims (1950–2012), snowboarder and skateboarder
- Tom Sims (Australian footballer) (born 2006), Australian rules footballer

== See also ==
- Thomas Robertson Sim, botanist, bryologist, botanical artist and Conservator of Forests
