= Samuel Simms the younger =

Samuel Simms (1836 – 22 February 1885) was an English organist and composer.

== Background ==
He was born in Stourbridge in 1836, the son of Samuel Simms also an organist.

He succeeded his father as organist of St. Thomas's Church, Stourbridge and held two other organist positions in Birmingham.

He founded the Brierley Hill Choral Society and conducted it from its formation.

He died at Stourbridge on 22 February 1885, and his son, also Samuel, succeeded him as organist at St Cyprian's Church, Hay Mills. He was interred in the churchyard of St. Mary's Church, Oldswinford.

== Appointments ==
- Organist of St Thomas' Church, Stourbridge 1868? - ????
- Organist of St John's Church, Ladywood ???? - 1879
- Organist of St Cyprian's Church, Hay Mills 1879 - 1885

== Compositions ==
His compositions included Services, anthems, and organ pieces.
