= St John's Church, Ladywood =

Coordinates: 52°28′39″N 1°55′39″W

Church of St. John the Evangelist, Ladywood
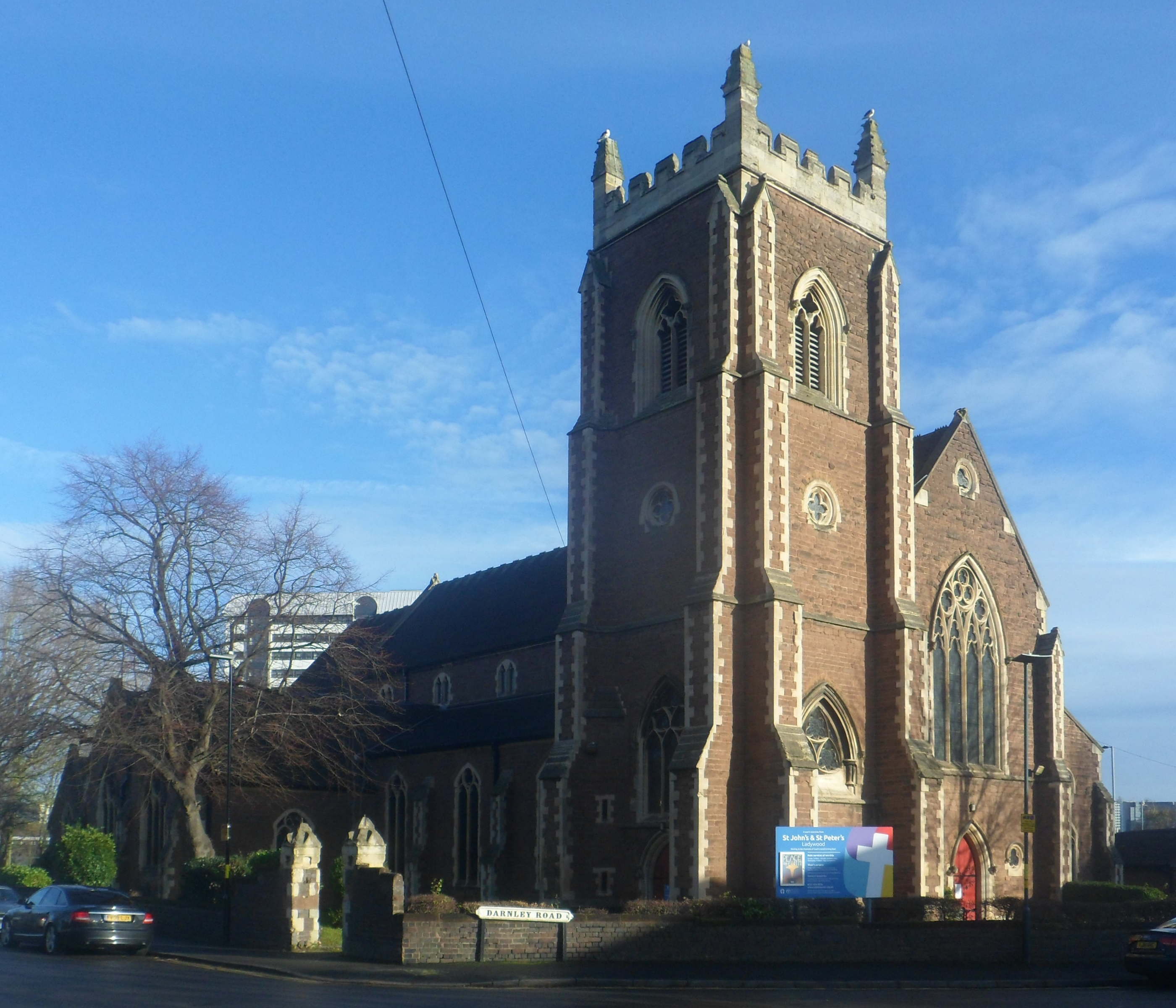
- Church of St. John the Evangelist, Ladywood, in December 2021
- Church of St. John the Evangelist, Ladywood
- OS grid reference: SP 05023 86634
- Country: England
- Denomination: Church of England
- Churchmanship: Broad Church
- Website: www.stjohnpeter.org.uk/

History
- Dedication: St. John the Evangelist

Administration
- Province: Canterbury
- Diocese: Birmingham

The Church of St. John the Evangelist and St. Peter is a Grade II listed Church of England church of Ladywood, Birmingham, England.

== History ==
The Church of St. John the Evangelist was built to designs by the architect Samuel Sanders Teulon between 1852 and 1854. It was founded as a mission from St Martin in the Bull Ring and the rector of St. Martin’s was patron of the living.

The governors of the King Edward VI Schools had also agreed to allow a site on their property. The site was on what was then known as Ladywood Green, a 17th-century Great Plague burial ground. Frederick Gough, 4th Baron Calthorpe laid the foundation stone on 28 September 1852, and the church was consecrated by Henry Pepys, the Bishop of Worcester, on 15 March 1854. The cost of the building was £6,000 (equivalent to equivalent to £575,108 in 2025). It was a commissioners' church as a grant of £247 (equivalent to £23,675 in 2025) was given towards its cost by the Church Building Society.

In 1876 part of the parish was taken to form the new parish of St Margaret’s Church, Ladywood.

In 1881, a further sum of £2,350 (equivalent to £247,049 in 2025), was expended in the erection of a new chancel and other additions by the architect J. A. Chatwin.

The church was significantly redeveloped and restored internally between 1994 and 2005, (a flagship to internal church redevelopment) which now enables the building to have a light, airy, flexible worship space. The building benefits from good acoustics. Many different organisations use this building and it plays host to numerous concerts and other events throughout the year. It is a church that is very much alive and serving the local community and beyond. Following the closure of St Peter's Church, Spring Hill in 2001 the parish is now known as St John and St Peter's, Ladywood.

== Clergy ==
- Francis Morse 1854-1865
- Richard J. Mooyaart 1864-1868
- John Leech Porter 1868-1888
- A. R. Runnels-Moss 1888-1921
- J. L. Porter 1921-1927
- Canon Parslew 1927-1940
- Norman Darrall 1940-1952
- Norman Power 1952-1988
- Richard Tetlow 1989-2008
- Ian Harper 2010–present

== Organ ==
The church had an organ by Bevington installed in 1858 which was modified in 1888. A specification of this organ can be found on the National Pipe Organ Register.

This organ was replaced by a Hammond organ in 1939 which was subsequently upgraded.

A two manual, 33 stop Renaissance Quantum digital organ by Allen was installed in 2008.

=== List of organists ===
- Alfred R. Gaul 1859-1868
- Samuel Simms ????-1879 (afterwards organist of St. Cyprian's Church, Hay Mills)
- Mark James Monk 1879–1880 (later organist of Truro Cathedral)
- Thomas Troman 1880–1881
- Henry Taylor 1881–1903
- Samuel Simms (son of earlier Samuel Simms) (previously organist of St. Cyprian's Church, Hay Mills)
- W. E. Robinson 1907-????

=== Directors of music ===
- Ian Biggs, M Mus, FNMSM, ARCO 2011–2013 (previously assistant organist at St Mary's Church Moseley)

== St. Peter’s Church, Spring Hill ==
St Peter’s, Spring Hill built in 1901 ceased to function as an Anglican church in 2001 and was combined with St John’s to make one new, larger parish.
