= Fred Simms =

Australian rules footballer

Personal information
- Full name: Fred Simms
- Born: 6 March 1929
- Died: 3 February 1997 (aged 67)
- Original team: Belgrave
- Height: 180 cm (5 ft 11 in)
- Weight: 80 kg (176 lb)

Playing career^{1}
Years	Club	Games (Goals)
1949–50	South Melbourne	4 (0)
- ^{1} Playing statistics correct to the end of 1950.

Fred Simms (6 March 1929 – 3 February 1997) was an Australian rules footballer who played with South Melbourne in the Victorian Football League (VFL).
