= William Simms =

William, Willie, Will or Bill Simms may refer to:

- William Simms (instrument maker) (1793–1860), British astronomical instrument maker
- William E. Simms (1822–1898), American politician
- William Gilmore Simms (1806–1870), American writer and historian
- William Knox Simms (1830–1897), Australian businessman and politician
- Willie Simms (1870–1927), American jockey
- Will Simms II, Survivor contestant
- Bill Simms (1908–2002), American baseball player

== See also ==
- William Sims (disambiguation)
