= Henry Simms =

British criminal and highwayman

- Born: c.1717 St Martin-in-the-Fields, London, England
- Died: 17 June 1747; Tyburn, London, England
- Occupations: Test Architect, Highwayman, Criminal

Henry Simms (c. 1717 – 17 June 1747), known as Young Gentlemen Harry, was a thief and highwayman in 18th-century England who was transported to Maryland for theft, but escaped and returned to England, where he was eventually executed for highway robbery.

== Biography ==
=== Early life ===
Simms was born around 1717, in St Martin-in-the-Fields, London, and was orphaned at a young age. He was sent to live with his grandmother who had him educated at an academy in St James's parish. He was a good scholar, and as well as learning to read and write he picked up some measure of French and Latin.

He showed some criminal tendencies from as young as ten, stealing money from the till of a shop he was visiting with his grandmother. Later, having fallen in with bad company in the slum area of St Giles, he robbed his grandmother of 17 pounds, and spent the evening getting drunk. His new acquaintances then robbed him of his money and his clothes. Through the efforts of a kindly landlord who took pity on the boy, who he found wandering in the streets dressed in rags, his grandmother was persuaded to take Simms back into her house, but for a month he was kept shackled to the kitchen grate during the day and guarded at night.

At the end of the month, he was set free and immediately returned to St. Giles where he was again made drunk and robbed of his clothes. Despite this, his grandmother allowed him to return to the house, and arranged an apprenticeship for him with a breeches-maker. Simms did not last long in the position: after he was reprimanded, he ran away, and stole clothes from grandmother's house which he sold. His grandmother went to live at the house of Lady Stanhope, but Simms followed her there and having gained admittance stole several items. These he sold for nine pounds and spent the proceeds with his criminal friends.

After this his grandmother would have nothing further to do with him, and he supported himself with petty crime. He was arrested as a pickpocket and was fortunate to escape transportation for extortion. Fearing arrest he pleaded with his grandmother to help him, and while she would not accept him back into her house, she arranged for him to stay with friends. However he soon slipped back into a life of crime and robbed a man of his watch in Marylebone.

=== Highway robbery and transportation ===
More of his acquaintances were transported and, again worried that he might meet the same fate, Simms managed to secure himself a position as a coach driver for an inn-keeper and soon moved on to driving the carriage of a nobleman. With a little money to his name from the wages he had earned in this position he once again took to crime, this time as a highwayman. Because of his education, dress and supposed skill as a thief he became known in the underworld as "Gentleman Harry". He committed several robberies at Blackheath, and was pursued to Lewisham, where he threatened his pursuers with pistols, scaring them off. He stopped a coach on the way to London and robbed the occupant of 102 guineas (more than most people earned in a year at the time) which he immediately spent on the gaming tables in London (even tipping the driver of the coach who saw him in London five shillings to pretend not to have recognized him).

A reward was put up for his capture and to avoid arrest he signed on first as a privateer and then as a soldier. He was involved in the assault on a prostitute in a brothel and was arrested, but for giving evidence against his accomplices he was set free (they were transported). His freedom did not last long: he was soon arrested for robbing a baker's shop and sentenced to be transported. He planned to escape when the ship transporting him rounded the Isle of Wight, but he was under close guard and could not put his plan into action.

Arriving in Maryland, he was sold as an indentured servant for 12 guineas, but almost immediately escaped, stealing his master's horse and riding for the coast. There he was taken on as a seaman and offered six guineas to work the ship back to England. The ship was captured by the French, but the crew were ransomed and Simms got work on a man o' war rising to the rank of midshipman. However, as soon as the ship put into port in England he left it and used his wages to live the high life for a while in Bristol.

Running out of money he signed aboard another ship but fell out with the captain and was put ashore with no pay. He stole a horse and rode to London, robbing the London to Bristol coach on the way. Notices were put out regarding the stolen horse, so he abandoned it and stole another, but unfortunately when he tried to pass the turnpike at Tyburn the keeper recognised the horse and knocked him off. Simms threatened him with his pistols and managed to escape.

=== Capture and execution ===
Simms carried out a series of robberies in London and Epping Forest, but wasted his money on prostitutes and worried for his safety decided to leave for Ireland. Robbing several people and the St. Albans stage on the way, he was pursued to Hockliffe where he was captured after falling asleep in an inn. He was sent to Bedford Gaol to await trial, but having somehow retained one of his pistols he attempted to escape on the way. His pistol misfired and the attempt was unsuccessful.

He was transferred to London by a writ of habeas corpus, and having been sentenced to death for highway robbery was committed to Newgate to await execution. Although initially shocked by his sentence, he regained his composure and continued life as best he could within the confines of the prison. He wrote a thirty-page autobiography entitled The Life of Henry Simms, from his Birth to his Exit and had many women visitors. He and a fellow prisoner, Mary Allen, became attached to one another, even though Simms would occasionally beat her. In an attempt to win his freedom he began to write to the King and various Secretaries of State claiming that there was a plot to assassinate the King and that he could reveal the details in return for a pardon. Little came of the ruse, some people were arrested, but on examination it became clear that Simms had concocted the story. Realising he was not going to be freed he made a statement claiming that he had been responsible for another crime absolving the man suspected of committing it, Black Sam, even though the stolen goods had been found at Black Sam's house.

The night before his execution, he obtained a knife and hid it in his clothing, but it was found and taken from him. On the day of his execution, 17 June 1747, he dressed smartly in clean clothes and, as he mounted the cart which took the prisoners to the gallows at Tyburn, he tossed his shoes into the crowd. Going up to the gallows he saw a man who had been arrested as a result of Simms' fictitious assassination plot, and asked his forgiveness. As they were about to be hanged, he joined hands with Mary Allen.
