= Sims (surname) =

Sims is an English surname. Notable people with the surname include:

== Art and entertainment ==
=== Music and dance ===
- Ezra Sims (1928–2015), American composer
- Howard "Sandman" Sims (1917–2003), American vaudeville dancer
- Hylda Sims (1932–2020), English folk musician
- Jamal Sims, American choreographer and director
- Kym Sims (born 1966), American singer
- Matthew Simms, English guitarist
- Natalie Sims (born 1984), American recording artist and songwriter
- Ray Sims (1921–2000), American trombonist
- Simmie Sims III (Buddy) (born 1993), American rapper, singer, dancer, and actor
- Zoot Sims (1925–1985), American saxophonist

=== Television and film ===
- Chloe Sims (born 1981), English television personality
- David Sims (director) (born 1948), New Zealander film director
- Elliot L. Sims, Canadian film and television screenwriter
- Jeremy Sims (born 1966), Australian actor
- Joan Sims (1930–2001), British actress
- Molly Sims (born 1973), American actress and swimsuit model
- Tim Sims (1962–1995), Canadian actor

=== Writing ===
- Bennett Sims (author), American novelist
- George Frederick Sims (1923–1999), English bookseller and writer
- George Robert Sims (1847–1922), British journalist and author
- Gill Sims (born 1978), British author and blogger
- Guy A. Sims (born 1961), American author
- Judith Sims (c. 1939–1996), American journalist, music critic, and magazine editor
- Marian McCamy Sims (1899–1961), American writer

=== Visual arts ===
- Art Sims (born 1954), American graphic designer and art director
- Charles Sims (painter) (1873–1928), British painter
- Sheryl Sims, American quilter

=== Other ===
- Howard Sims (1933–2016), African American architect, businessman, and philanthropist
- Jonathan Sims (born 1988), British horror writer, voice actor, musician, and game designer
- Kayla Sims (born 1999), American YouTuber
- Monica Sims (1925–2018), British radio producer
- Ronald Hubert Sims (1923–1999), British architect and artist

== Business and economics ==
- Christopher A. Sims (born 1942), American economist
- Cliff Sims, American entrepreneur and author
- Ed Sims, New Zealander businessman
- William Dillwyn Sims (1825–1895), English industrialist and artist
- Zach Sims, American entrepreneur

== Military ==
- Amor L. Sims (1896–1978), American US Marine Corps officer
- Charles Sims (RAF officer) (1899–1929), English military pilot
- Douglas Sims II, US Army general
- John Joseph Sims (1835–1881), English recipient of the Victoria Cross
- William Sims (1858–1936), American admiral after whom several ships were named

== Politics ==
- Alexander D. Sims (1803–1848), U.S. Representative from South Carolina
- Barbara Sims (born 1939), American politician
- Betty Sims (1935–2016), American politician
- Brian Sims (born 1978), American politician, member of the Pennsylvania House of Representatives
- Carl Sims (1911–1968), American politician
- Chuck Sims (born 1958), American politician
- Edgar A. Sims (1875–1945), American politician
- Freddie Sims (born 1950), American politician
- Francis Sims, British trade unionist.
- Jinny Sims (born 1952), Indo-Canadian politician and former union activist
- Katherine Sims, American politician
- Kathleen Sims (1942–2019), American politician
- Littlepage Sims, American politician
- Lonnie Sims (born 1970), American politician
- Thetus W. Sims (1852–1939), American politician
- William H. Sims (American politician) (1837–1920), American politician
- William P. Sims, American politician

== Scholars and academics ==
- Alexandra Sims, New Zealander professor of law
- Elisabeth Hoemberg (1909–1994), Canadian historian, born as Elisabeth Sims
- Kelly Sims, now Kelly Sims Gallagher, American international affairs scholar
- Michael Sims (born 1958), American non-fiction writer
- Robert Page Sims (1872–1944), American academic, civil rights leader, scientist, and college president

== Science and medicine ==
- Brailey Sims (born 1947), Australian mathematician
- Charles Sims (mathematician) (1937–2017), American mathematician
- J. Marion Sims (1813–1883), American surgeon
- John Sims (taxonomist) (1749–1831), English physician and botanist
- Kenneth Sims (geologist) (born 1959), American geology professor
- Oliver Sims (1943–2015), British computer scientist
- Stacy Sims (born 1973), exercise physiologist, author, and women's health and fitness advocate
- Stella James Sims (1875–1963), American science professor

== Sport ==
=== American football ===
- Barry Sims (born 1974), American football player
- Ben Sims (born 2000), American football player
- Billy Sims (born 1955), American football player
- Blake Sims (born 1992), American football player
- Bud Sims, American football coach
- Cam Sims (born 1996), American football player
- Ernie Sims (born 1984), American football player
- Jeff Sims (born 2002), American football player
- Jimmy Sims (born 1953), American football player
- Johnny Sims (born 1967), American football player
- LeShaun Sims (born 1993), American football player
- Marvin Sims (born 1957), American former football player
- Phillip Sims (American football) (born 1992), American football player
- Quentin Sims (born 1990), American football player
- Rudy Sims (born 1946) is a Canadian football player
- Terry Sims (born c. 1971), American football coach
- Tom Sims (American football) (born 1967), American football player
- Tommy Sims (American football) (born 1964), American football player

=== Basketball ===
- Jaylen Sims (born 1998), American basketball player
- Jericho Sims (born 1998), American basketball player
- LaTonya Sims (born 1979), American basketball player
- Lazarus Sims (born 1972), American former basketball player
- Willie Sims (1958–2022), American-Israeli basketball player

=== Cricket ===
- Albert Sims (1871–1962), Australian cricketer
- Gareth Sims (born 1983), Zimbabwean former cricketer
- Ilenia Sims (born 2002), English cricketer
- Jim Sims (1903–1973), English cricketer

=== Other ===
- Alexander Sims (racing driver) (born 1988), British racing driver
- Anthony Sims Jr. (born 1995), American boxer
- Ashton Sims (born 1985), Australian rugby league footballer
- Bella Sims (born 2005), American swimmer
- Dave Sims (born 1953), Seattle-based sportscaster
- Jack Sims (born 1999), English footballer
- Jess Sims (born 1990), Welsh bowls player
- John Sims (footballer) (born 1952), English former professional footballer
- Josh Sims (footballer) (born 1997), English professional footballer
- Josh Sims (lacrosse) (born 1978), American professional lacrosse player
- Korbin Sims (born 1992), Australian rugby league footballer
- Landon Sims (born 2001), American baseball player
- Leo Sims, American baseball player
- Lucas Sims (born 1994), American baseball player
- Lyndon Sims (1917–1999), Welsh rally driver
- Natalie Sims (swimmer) (born 1997), American Paralympic swimmer
- Odyssey Sims (born 1992), American basketball player
- Ruan Sims (born 1982), Australian rugby footballer
- Sanders Sims (1921–2003), American field hockey player
- Shane Sims (born 1988), American ice hockey defenseman
- Toby Sims (born 1997), English footballer
- Tom Sims (1950–2012), American snowboarding pioneer
- Tony Sims (born 1985), American mixed martial artist

== Other ==
- Dorothy Sims (disambiguation), multiple people
- Henry Sims (disambiguation), multiple people
- James Sims (disambiguation), multiple people
- P. Hal Sims (1886–1949), American contract bridge player
- Ray Dell Sims (born 1935), American serial killer
- Steve Sims (disambiguation), multiple people
- Terry Melvin Sims (1942–2000), American convicted murderer
- Thomas Sims, subject of a notorious American fugitive slave case
- Vickie Sims (born 1956), priest
- William Edward Sims (1842–1891), American lawyer

== Related surnames ==
- Simms (disambiguation)
- Simmes
- Symmes (disambiguation)
- Siems
- Siemes
- Siemens (surname)
