= Sim =

Sim or SIM may refer to:

== Computing and technology ==
- SIM card or Subscriber Identity Module, used by mobile telephones
- HP Systems Insight Manager, a system management tool
- Scientific instrument module in the Apollo command and service module
- Security information management in computer security
- Selected ion monitoring, a mass spectrometry scanning mode
- Computer simulation
- Space Interferometry Mission, cancelled by NASA
- Super-resolution microscopy § Structured illumination microscopy (SIM)

== Organizations ==
- Service de sécurité incendie de Montréal
- Scuola Italiana di Montevideo, the Italian day school of Montevideo, Uruguay
- Serving In Mission (formerly Sudan Interior Mission), a Christian mission organization
- Seniman Indonesia Muda (Young Artists of Indonesia), an Indonesian artist collective
- Servicio de Inteligencia Militar, a former Dominican intelligence service
- Servicio de investigación Militar, a former Spanish military intelligence service
- Servizio Informazioni Militari, a former Italian military intelligence service
- Singapore Institute of Management
- Society for Industrial Microbiology and Biotechnology
- Society for Information Management

== Media ==
- TV SIM, a television station in Vitória, Espírito Santo, Brazil
- Rádio Sim, a defunct Portuguese radio station

== People ==
- Sim (Korean surname) 심
- Sim (Scottish surname)
- Shěn (surname) 沈, a Chinese surname sometimes romanized as Sim
- Sim (actor) (1926–2009), French actor, humourist, writer and comedian
- Sim Wong Hoo (1955–2023), founder of Creative Technology
- Alastair Sim (1900–1976), English actor
- Desmond Sim (born 1961), Singaporean playwright
- Kihwan Sim (born 1983), South Korean bass-baritone
- Thomas Robertson Sim (1858–1938), Scottish botanist

== Places ==
- Sım, a village and municipality in Azerbaijan
- Sim (river), in Russia
- Sim, Russia, several inhabited localities
- Sim (historical region), in Horn of Africa

== Pop culture ==
- Sim (album), 2017, by Vanessa da Mata
- SiM (band), a Japanese rock band
- SIM (film), 2013
- Sim (pencil game)

== Transport ==
- Simei MRT station, Singapore, MRT station abbreviation
- Simi Valley station, California, Amtrak station code

== Other uses ==
- Siberian International Marathon
- Surat Izin Mengemudi, the driving license in Indonesia

== See also ==
- Simsim (disambiguation)
- Sim4, a bioinformatics sequence alignment program
- SIM-VIII, 1931 Yugoslav airplane
- Sims (disambiguation)
- Simm (disambiguation)
- Simming, the act of playing an online roleplaying game
