= Sims =

Sims, sims or SIMS may refer to:

== Games ==
- The Sims, a life simulation video game series
  - The Sims (video game), the first installment, released in 2000
  - The Sims 2, the second installment, released in 2004
  - The Sims 3, the third installment, released in 2009
  - The Sims 4, the fourth installment, released in 2014
- Sims (bidding system), a bidding system in contact bridge

== Science and computing ==
- Secondary-ion mass spectrometry, a chemical analysis technique
- Structured Inventory of Malingered Symptomatology, a psychology questionnaire
- Single interface to multiple sources, an ontology-based approach to data integration
- Student information system, computer software for managing student records
- School Information Management System, a student information system by Capita

== Companies and organizations ==
- SIMS Co., Ltd., a Japanese video game publisher and developer
- Sims Metal Management, a recycling company
- Sims Snowboards
- Services Institute of Medical Sciences, a medical school in Pakistan
- Symbiosis Institute of Management Studies, a business school in India

== Places ==
=== United States ===
- Sims, Illinois, a village
- Sims, North Carolina, a town
- Sims, Texas, a ghost town
- Sims Township, Grant County, Indiana, a township
  - Sims, Indiana, an unincorporated community of Sims Township
- Sims Township, Michigan
- Sims High School, former segregated African American high school
- Sims Hotel, Plumerville, Arkansas
- Sims site, an archaeological site in Saint Charles parish, Louisiana

=== Other ===
- Sims Island, Antarctica
- Sims (river), a river of Bavaria, Germany
- Simm (mountain), originally sims, a category of mountain summit in the British Isles

== People ==
- Sims (surname) (includes a list of people with the name)
- Sims (rapper), American rapper
- Sims Ellison (1967–1995), American guitarist
- Sims Stokes (born 1944), American football player

== Other uses ==
- Plural of sim
- Sims (novel), a book by F. Paul Wilson
- "Sims", a song by Lauv from How I'm Feeling
- USS Sims, several ships with the name

== See also ==
- Sim (disambiguation)
- Syms (disambiguation)
