= Kenneth Sims (disambiguation) =

Kenneth Sims (1959–2025) was an American professional football player.

Kenneth Sims may also refer to:

- Kenneth Sims (geologist) (born 1959), American geologist
- Kenneth Simms (born 1986), American basketball player

== See also ==
- Ken Sim (born 1970), Canadian politician
