= Michael Park =

Michael Park may refer to:

- Michael Park (co-driver) (1966–2005), British rally co-driver
- Michael Park (actor) (born 1968), American actor
- Michael H. Park (born 1976), United States Circuit Judge
- Mike Park (active since 1985), Korean American musician and activist

== See also ==
- Michael Park School, a Steiner School in New Zealand
- Michael Parks (disambiguation)
