= Simm =

Simm may refer to:

- SIMM (single in-line memory module), a type of memory module used in computers
- Simm (hill), a hill in the British Isles that is over 600 m high and has a prominence of at least 30 m
- Simm (surname)

== See also ==
- Sim (disambiguation)
