= Michael Parks (disambiguation) =

Michael Parks may refer to:

- Michael Parks (1940–2017), American actor and singer
- Michael Parks (ice hockey) (born 1992), American hockey player
- Michael Parks (reporter) (1943–2022), American journalist

== See also ==
- Michael Parkes (born 1944), American-born artist living in Spain
- Mike Parkes (1931–1977), British racing driver
- Michael Park (disambiguation)
