= Indonesian identity card =

Official identity document of Indonesian citizens

Indonesian identity card Kartu Tanda Penduduk
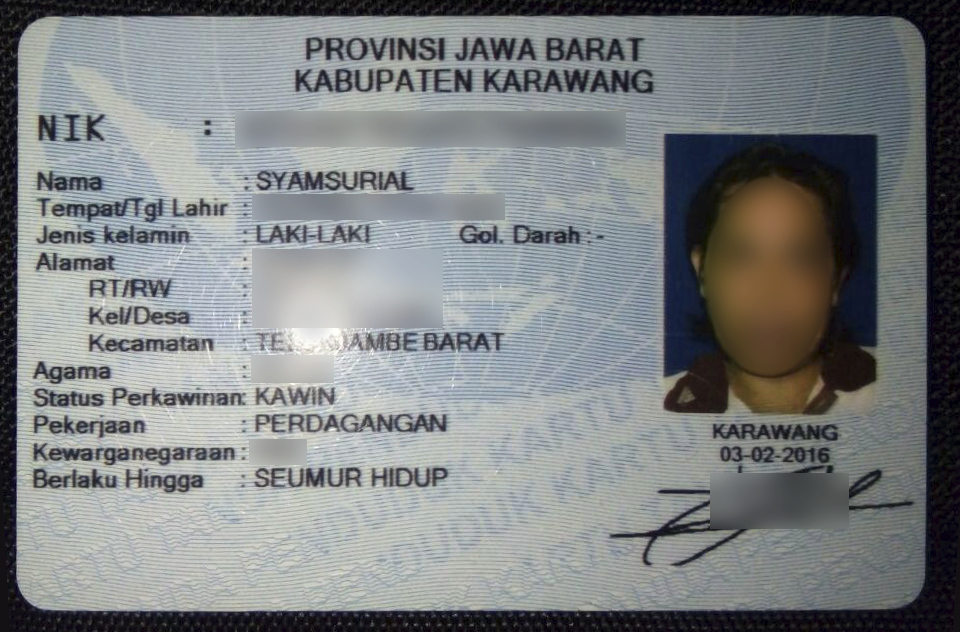
- Indonesian identity card from 2016
- Type: Identity card
- Issued by: Indonesia
- Purpose: Identification
- Eligibility: Residents or citizens of Indonesia age 17 or above
- Expiration: No expiration (E-KTP)
- Cost: Free

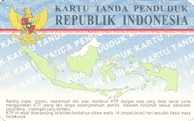
Obverse of Jakarta-issued KTP

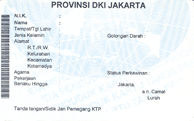
Reverse of Jakarta-issued KTP

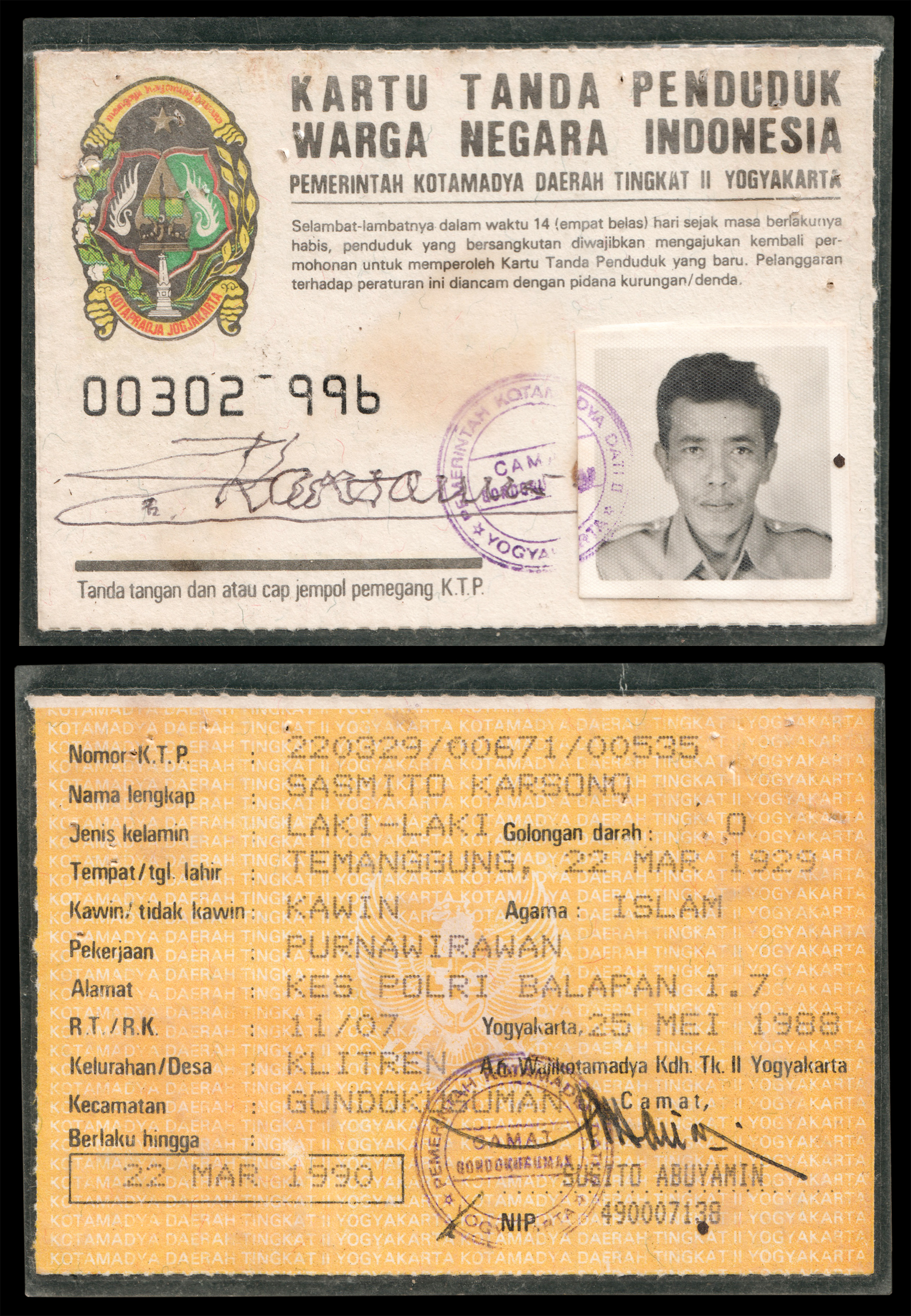
An Indonesian identity card from 1988

The Indonesian identity card (Indonesian: Kartu Tanda Penduduk, abbr. KTP), is a compulsory identity card for Indonesian citizens and residents with a valid resident permit. The card is issued upon reaching the age of 17 or upon marriage. For Indonesian citizens, the card is valid for life (previously it was only valid for 5 years for citizens under 60 years old). For non-Indonesian citizens, it is valid for as long as their residency permit allows. Since 2011, the Indonesian government has issued an electronic version of the card, known as the e-KTP (KTP elektronik), which contains an embedded microchip.

== History ==
=== Dutch East Indies ===
The general identity card during the Dutch colonial era was called a residence certificate (Dutch: verklaring van ingezetenschap). This card did not record the bearer's religion. Citizens seeking to obtain proof of residence were required to contact their local controleur (controller) and pay a fee of 1.5 guilders. The paper card measuring 15 by 10 centimetres (5.9 in × 3.9 in) was issued and signed by heads of local administrations (hoofd van plaatselijk). Two additional types of ID documents were required by Chinese in the Dutch East Indies: the entry permit (Dutch: toelatingskaart) and the residency permit (vergunning tot vestiging, known as ongji by Chinese).

=== Japanese period ===
The Japanese occupation (1942–45) ID card was made from paper and was much wider than the current KTP. It featured Japanese and Indonesian text. Behind the main data section was a propaganda spiel that indirectly required the holder to swear allegiance to the Japanese invaders. Hence it became known as KTP-Propaganda.

=== First 32 years of independence ===
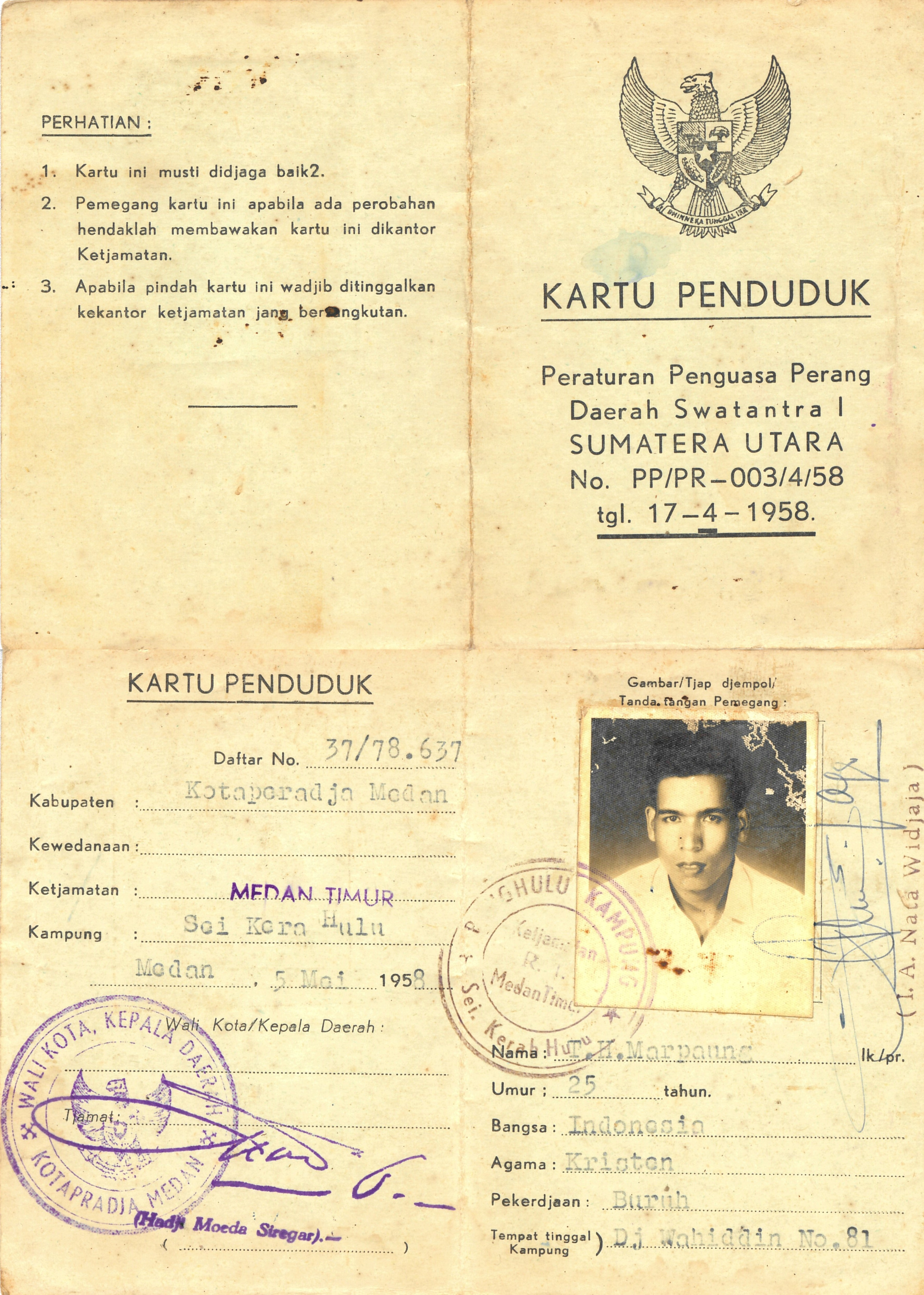
An Indonesian identity card issued in 1958.

After Indonesia declared independence in 1945, the certificate of residence was replaced with the Indonesian Citizenship Certificate (Surat Tanda Kewarganegaraan Indonesia). This document was partly typed and partly handwritten. It was in use from 1945 to 1977. It was a paper card without any laminate. The card underwent several changes during this period, partly concerning the rights and responsibilities of the bearer. Different ID cards were issued by different regions and eventually became uniform under the head of Population Registration in 1976.

=== Discrimination ===
During Suharto’s New Order regime (1966–98), citizenship cards held by former political prisoners (tahanan politik or tapol) and ethnic Chinese featured special codes to denote their status. This policy allowed government officials to know whether a person was a former political prisoner or of Chinese descent. The discriminatory codes were later abandoned.

=== 1977–2003 KTP ===
The KTP was made from paper, laminated in plastic and stamped with an ink stamp. Cards were issued by the lowest neighborhood administrative levels, known as RT and RW. The cards featured a photo, signature, serial number and thumb print. The background color of the KTP was often yellow.

=== Aceh Emergency KTP ===
When Aceh province was placed under a state of Military Emergency in 2003, it had a different KTP design featuring a red and white background and a garuda bird. The card was signed by the subdistrict head, the local military commander and head of police.

=== 2004–2011 KTP ===
The bearer's photo was printed directly onto a plastic card. Surveillance, verification, and validation remained at the RT/RW levels. This KTP featured the bearer's thumb print and a unique serial number.

== Electronic KTP (e-KTP) ==
The e-KTP was trialed in six areas in 2009 and launched nationwide in 2011. The card is supposed to be more durable, contains a microchip, unique serial number and can be used for multiple applications for government services. Its implementation has become tainted by corruption. In May 2013, it was reported the chip inside the e-KTP could be damaged and rendered useless by repeatedly photocopying the card.

The e-KTP contains unique biometric data and was designed to improve government services and population databases, while reducing fraud and security threats.

The e-KTP is the basis for the issuance of Indonesian passports, driving licenses (SIM), Taxpayer Identification Numbers (NPWP), insurance policies, land ownership certificates and other identity documents (Article 13 of Law no. 23/ 2006 on Residency Administration).

Data recording for e-KTP registration involves taking fingerprints from all 10 fingers, although the card's chip records only the right thumb and index finger prints. The e-KTP consists of nine layers to increase security. A chip is implanted between white and transparent plastic on the top two layers. The chip has an antenna that issues a wave when swiped. The wave will be recognized by a detector to verify whether the rightful holder is using the card. Data storage in the chip is in accordance with international standards and NISTIR 7123 Machine Readable Travel Documents ICAO and EU Passport 9303 Specification 2006. The size of the card is in accordance with ISO/IEC 7810 with a credit card size form factor that is 53.98 by 85.60 millimetres (2.125 in × 3.370 in).

Indonesia's e-KTP program achieved 100 million biometric enrollments and de-duplications in just under one year. e-KTP data has no expiration date, even if the cards show expiration dates.

== Content ==
- Single Identity Number (Nomor Induk Kependudukan)
- Full name
- Place and date of birth (DD-MM-YYYY)
- Gender
- Marital status
- Religion
- Blood type
- Address
- Occupation
- Nationality
- Photograph
- Expiry date (Column still present despite currently having lifelong validity, since previously it was only valid for 5 years)
- Place and date of issue
- Bearer's signature

=== Name column ===
Since Indonesia has a multitude of ethnicities and languages and naming conventions, some cultures like Javanese culture does not have surnames or family names. Thus in the name column, the name of the person is written in the format of <first name> <middle names>(optional) <last name>(optional). Most digital filing system in Indonesia sort Indonesian names by their first name. Single word names usually never have a problem in their daily life with regard of lack of surname (with the exception when applying visa to foreign countries, working in foreign countries, etc.).

=== Religion column ===
The card requires identification with one of the six officially recognised religions in Indonesia: Islam, Protestantism, Catholicism, Hinduism, Buddhism, and Confucianism. In 2006 the need to retain this arrangement was reiterated by Minister of Religious Affairs Maftuh Basyuni:

"Official religions of the country is vital to ensuring good harmony between religious groups as well as being of use in more practical matters such as marriage and burial."

However, in 2014, the Minister of Home Affairs suggested that the section should be optional, that is, that it could be left blank. Religious groups want to retain it. Following the ruling of Constitutional Court of Indonesia, per 1 July 2018, believers of indigenous faith are allowed to put "penghayat kepercayaan" (believer) on religion column in identification card.

Confucianism as an option was reinstated in 2006, having been dropped in 1965 by Suharto in the wake of the failed communist coup attempt.

== e-KTP corruption scandal ==
The Home Affairs Ministry in 2009 commenced a trial implementation of e-KTP in six regions: Makassar, Padang, Denpasar, Yogyakarta, Cirebon and Jembrana. The trial project, conducted by the Lintas Peruri Solusi consortium, encountered numerous technical troubles and alleged corruption.

The Attorney General's Office in June 2010 named four suspects from the Home Affairs Ministry's Director General of Population Administration over alleged corruption in the procurement of hardware, software systems and blank ID cards for the 2009 trial project. Despite the corruption probe, the e-KTP project went ahead nationwide in 2011. The Attorney General's Office dropped its investigation in January 2012, citing a lack of evidence.

Indonesia's Corruption Eradication Commission (KPK) then investigated irregularities in the Rp 5.9 trillion ($443 million) e-KTP project and found that alleged graft had caused state losses of Rp 2.3 trillion.

Indonesia Corruption Watch (ICW) alleged there was fraud in the awarding of contracts for procurement of equipment. Irregularities were also suspected because some technologies promised in the tendered contracts were not provided. For example, in the case of identification equipment, a consortium comprising Percetakan Negara Republik Indonesia (state-owned printing company), Quadra Solusindo, Sucofindo, LEN Industri and Sandipala Arthaputra, promised to use iris recognition technology, but only used a fingerprint system.

On 22 April 2014, Sugiharto, the former director of Population Administration Information Management at the Home Affairs Ministry's Directorate General of Civil Registration was named a suspect by the KPK. On 30 September 2016, Irman, the former director general of Population and Civil Registry at the Home Affairs Ministry was named a suspect for allegedly marking up costs of the project.

Home Affairs Minister Tjahjo Kumolo suspended the project in September 2014.

On 17 July 2017, House of Representatives speaker Setya Novanto was declared a suspect over his alleged involvement in the embezzlement of e-KTP funds. He denied any wrongdoing. He failed to meet two summonses for questioning by KPK investigators in September 2017 because of alleged poor health. On 29 September, South Jakarta District Court rescinded his status as a suspect. On 24 April 2018, Jakarta Corruption Court convicted Setya of corruption and sentenced him to 15 years in jail for his role in the scandal.

In March 2017, KPK released a list of more than 30 recipients of the e-KTP project funds, including a number of ministers and former legislators, such as Ganjar Pranowo, Yasonna Laoly and Gamawan Fauzi.

== See also ==
- Driving license in Indonesia
- Indonesian passport
