= Pariah (band) =

American hard rock band

- Origin: San Antonio, Texas, United States
- Genres: Heavy metal, glam metal, hard rock, alternative rock
- Years active: 1987–1995
- Labels: Geffen Records, Sick Kid Productions, Not On Label
- Past members: Shandon Sahm; Kyle Ellison; Sims Ellison; Jared Tuten; David Derrick

Pariah was an American hard rock band, formed in San Antonio, Texas, United States, while they knew each other in high school. The group consisted of Shandon Sahm son of Doug Sahm, brothers Kyle and Sims Ellison, Jared Tuten and David Derrick. Their influence was heavy metal and they were fans of Guns N' Roses.

== History ==
Their first album Rattle Your Skull was released in 1989 independently. They then were signed to Sick Kid Productions where their album Make Believe was recorded and released in 1992. In 1991 they signed with Geffen Records, recording their album, To Mock A Killingbird, which was released in 1993.

After Geffen dropped them out of their contract, Sims Ellison fell into a depression. He committed suicide on June 6, 1995, at the age of 28 of a self-inflicted gunshot wound. The group immediately disbanded and Sahm and Kyle Ellison joined the Meat Puppets in 1999.

The Sims Foundation was formed in honor of Sims. The charity is for musicians who have mental health issues by supporting them and their families.

== Discography ==
=== Studio albums ===
- 1989 - Rattle Your Skull (Not On Label)
- 1992 - Make Believe (Sick Kids Productions)
- 1993 - To Mock A Killingbird (Geffen Records)

=== Singles ===
- "Make Believe" 1993
- "Powerless" 1993

=== Lineups ===
- David Derrick - vocals
- Sims Ellison - bass
- Kyle Ellison - vocals, guitar
- Jared Tuten - guitar
- Shandon Sahm - drums
