= Syms (disambiguation) =

Syms may refer to:

- Sy Syms School of Business at Yeshiva University
- Robert Syms (born 1956), English politician
- Sy Syms (1926–2009), American businessman
- Sylvia Syms (1934–2023), English actress
- Sylvia Syms (1917–1992), American singer
- Syms Corporation, a clothing store founded by Sy Syms

== See also ==
- SIMS (disambiguation)
