= Simm (surname) =

Family name

Simm is an English surname, most commonly in England.

People:

- Josh Simm (born 2001), English rugby league player
- John Simm (born 1970), English actor and musician
- Kevin Simm (born 1980), English singer, songwriter, and musician who was a member of the pop group Liberty X
- Paul Simm, English songwriter, musician and music producer
- Indrek Simm (born 1973), Estonian film and television director
- Jaak Simm (1943–1981), Estonian linguist
- Juhan Simm (1885–1959), Estonian composer
- Peeter Simm (1953–2026), Estonian Film director
- Herman Simm (born 1947), former chief the Estonian Defence Ministry's security department, in 2009 convicted of treason
- Benjamin Simm (born 1986), German rugby union player

== See also ==
- Sim (disambiguation)
