= Simmes =

Surname list

Simmes is the surname of the following people

- Daniel Simmes (born 1966), German football manager and player
- Misty Blue Simmes (born 1959), American professional wrestler
- Valentine Simmes (fl. 1585 – 1622), English printer
- William Simmes (c. 1575 – c. 1625), English composer and musician

== See also ==
- Simme, river in canton of Bern, Switzerland
