= Littlepage Sims =

American politician

Littlepage Sims was an American political leader in Alabama. He served in the Alabama Senate representing Bibb County, Alabama in 1819. He was a delegate to the 1819 Alabama Constitutio al Convention and signed the 1819 Alabama Constitution. He was part of negotiations with the Cherokee over the borders of Rockwood, Tennessee at the Rockwood Oak.

In 1796 he served as Sheriff of Blount County, Tennessee.
