= Alexandra Sims =

New Zealand commercial law academic

Academic background
- Education: Macquarie University
- Thesis: Decentralised autonomous organisations: governance, dispute resolution and regulation (2021)
- Doctoral advisor: Yvette Blount, John Selby, Kay-Wah Chan

Academic work
- Institutions: University of Auckland

Alexandra Sims is a New Zealand legal academic, and is a full professor at the University of Auckland, specialising in consumer law and intellectual property law, especially blockchain, cryptocurrencies and digital technologies.

== Academic career ==
Sims was educated at a Steiner school, the Michael Park School in Auckland. After failing to get into university, she spent two years in London, and returned to complete a law degree at the University of Otago, followed by a Master of Commercial Law from the University of Auckland. She completed a PhD titled Decentralised autonomous organisations: governance, dispute resolution and regulation at Macquarie University in 2021. Sims joined the faculty of the University of Auckland in 2000, rising to full professor in 2024.

Sims's research initially focused on intellectual property law and consumer law. She has studied the unfair contract terms in New Zealand, and how these did not increase after the introduction of the unfair contacts term law, because there was no mechanism for dealing with contracts entered into with unfair terms. Sims more recently became interested in a third area of research, covering blockchain, cryptocurrencies, smart contracts and digital technologies. Her PhD was about Decentralised Autonomous Organisations. Sims is an associate of the University College London's Centre for Blockchain Technologies. Sims a member of the Executive Council of BlockchainNZ, and represented New Zealand on the OECD's Blockchain Expert Policy Advisory Board. She has appeared as a technology commentator for RadioNZ.

== Selected works ==
- G. Gunasekara (2005). "Statutory Trends and the 'Genetic Modification' of the Common Law: Company Law as a Paradigm". Statute Law Review. 26 (2): 82–102. doi:10.1093/slr/hmi010. Wikidata Q127947270.
- Sims, Alexandra (2016). "The case for fair use in New Zealand". International Journal of Law and Information Technology. 24 (2): 176–202. doi:10.1093/ijlit/eaw003. Wikidata Q127947269.
- Dulani Jayasuriya Daluwathumullagamage; Sims, Alexandra (18 June 2020), Blockchain-Enabled Corporate Governance and Regulation, vol. 8, p. 36, doi:10.3390/ijfs8020036, Wikidata Q111687684
- Dulani Jayasuriya Daluwathumullagamage; Sims, Alexandra (2021). "Fantastic Beasts: Blockchain Based Banking". Journal of Risk and Financial Management. 14 (4): 170. doi:10.3390/jrfm14040170. Wikidata Q127947268.
- D. Dulani Jayasuriya; Sims, Alexandra (2022). "From the abacus to enterprise resource planning: is blockchain the next big accounting tool?". Accounting. 36 (1): 24–62. doi:10.1108/aaaj-08-2020-4718. Wikidata Q127947267.
- Dulani Jayasuriya; Sims, Alexandra (2023). "Not So New Kid on the Block: Accounting and Valuation Aspects of Non-Fungible Tokens (NFTs)". Journal of Risk and Financial Management. 16 (11): 465. doi:10.3390/jrfm16110465. Wikidata Q127947266.
- Sims, Alexandra; Rad, Iris; Sargeant, Holli; Chen, Wendy; Nayyar, Ravi; Singh, Aarvi (2022). "UNICEF Public Consultation on Draft Policy Guidance on AI for Children". SSRN. doi:10.2139/ssrn.4088822. Wikidata Q113422184.
