= Symmes =

Symmes can refer to:

== People ==
- John Cleves Symmes, colonel in the Continental Army and New Jersey representative at the Continental Congress
- John Cleves Symmes, Jr., originator of the Hollow Earth theory
- Zechariah Symmes, Puritan minister in colonial Charlestown, Massachusetts

== Places ==
- Symmes Creek in southeastern Ohio
- Symmes Mission Chapel in Fairfield, Ohio
- Symmes Purchase in southwestern Ohio
- Symmes Township, Edgar County, Illinois
- Symmes Township, Hamilton County, Ohio
- Symmes Township, Lawrence County, Ohio
- Symmes Valley High School in Willow Wood, Ohio
