= Henry Sims (disambiguation) =

Henry Sims (born 1990) is an American basketball player. Henry Sims or Simms may also refer to:

- Henry "Son" Sims (1890–1958), American Delta blues fiddler and songwriter
- Henry Augustus Sims (1832–1875), Philadelphia architect
- Henry Simms (c. 1717–1747), English thief and highwayman
- Henry Simms (organist) (1804–1872), English organist and composer
