= Ray Dell Sims =

American serial killer

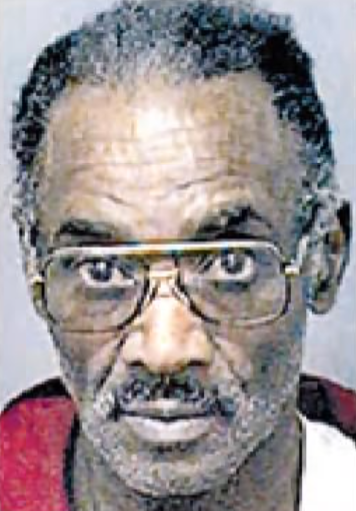
- 2001 mug shot
- Born: 1935 (age 90–91); Oklahoma, U.S.
- Other names: David McGown; David Reed Sims; David Sims
- Convictions: First degree murder (2 counts); Rape; Burglary
- Penalty: Life imprisonment x2

Details
- Victims: 5+
- Span of crimes: 1974–1977
- Country: United States
- State: California
- Date apprehended: 1977
- Imprisoned at: California State Prison, Solano, Vacaville, California

Ray Dell Sims (born 1935) is an American serial killer who is responsible for the murders of at least five girls in Fresno, California, from 1974 to 1977. Originally convicted of a single murder, he was linked to the later killings via DNA in 2001, and has since been convicted of one more and is currently serving two life terms.

== Early life ==
Little is known of Sims' background. Born in Oklahoma in 1935, in a family with multiple brothers and sisters, his first known conviction dates back to July 1965, when he raped a 70-year-old landlady in East Oakland during a burglary. After serving time in prison, Sims moved to Fresno in the early 1970s, where he married, had a daughter and found work as a fry cook.

At a later date, Sims' wife, Caroline Turner, would claim that her husband had a heightened sex drive and would often coerce her into having sex, during which he physically abused and even strangled her.

== Murder of Janet Herstein ==
On May 18, 1977, the body of 17-year-old Janet Herstein was found near a canal in Mendota by an employee of the USBR. Lacerations on her body indicated that she had been raped and then strangled with a cord. Herstein, a student at Theodore Roosevelt High School, also worked as a newsie for The Fresno Guide, and had been reported missing by her mother two days prior. While investigating her newspaper delivery route, police officers learned that all but one house had received their copies of the newspaper in the afternoon, and while all homeowners were questioned, none provided any useful information of the whereabouts of either Herstein or her bicycle.

While examining possible suspects, detectives first identified one homeowner, David McGown, as the last person to have seen her alive. Based on this finding, they arrested McGown, who claimed that he had nothing to do with the crime. It turned out David McGown was not the man's real name, but was actually just the alias of Ray Dell Sims. He was subsequently tried, convicted, and sentenced to life imprisonment without parole, after which he was sent to serve his sentence at San Quentin State Prison.

== Implication in other crimes ==
In 1996, a blood sample was taken from Sims as part of police protocol to investigate inmates in cold cases. The following year, DNA was found on the body of a woman which, according to investigators, matched the genotypic profile of the perpetrator with that of Sims. In November 2001, DNA testing was performed on a male hair found under a ring on the hand of another victim. The results again implicated Sims, who was subsequently charged with the murders.

The first of these killings was that of 17-year-old Kathy Stark, who was raped and murdered on August 22, 1974, followed by 15-year-old Elizabeth Ann Ortega on November 9. Seminal fluid found in the latter's underwear linked her to Sims, an acquaintance of Ortega as she was his wife's friend and had even visited their house on several occasions. The next killing occurred on November 14, 1975, when 18-year-old Robin McCullar was raped and murdered and the final known attack happening on June 9, 1976, when the body of 16-year-old Eva Hernandez Lucio, last seen walking home from school, was found in a local vineyard. All of the victims had lived in the same neighborhood as Sims, and each had been strangled.

In December 2001, Sims was transported from San Quentin State Prison to Fresno County Jail, where he was charged with the four murders and two rapes a few days later. He pleaded not guilty on all charges.

== Trial and imprisonment ==
In September 2008, Sims was found guilty in the Ortega murder, for which he was given a second life term the following month. Upon hearing the verdict, he expressed no visible emotion. It was ruled that the death penalty could not be sought, as all of the killings had been committed during the nationwide moratorium on capital punishment following Furman v. Georgia.

Because Sims had already been sentenced to life imprisonment and his possibility of parole was considered extremely low, the Fresno County District Attorney's Office ultimately dismissed the charges for the remaining murders, even though DNA proved that he was guilty beyond any doubt. After the trial, Sims was returned to San Quentin State Prison, where he continues to serve his sentence. Sims is also suspected in the murders of many other young women and girls. After his 2001 re-arrest, investigators tracked areas he lived in before he moved to Fresno to possibly connect him to other unsolved murders.

As of March 2025, no other crimes have been linked to Sims.

== See also ==
- List of serial killers in the United States
