= Kihwan Sim =

South Korean operatic singer (born 1983)

- Born: 1983 (age 42–43); South Korea
- Education: Yonsei University; Musikhochschule Hamburg
- Occupation: Operatic bass-baritone
- Organization: Oper Frankfurt

Kihwan Sim (born 1983) is a South Korean operatic bass-baritone based at Oper Frankfurt, where he has performed leading roles such as the title role of Mozart's Figaro and Orest in Elektra by Richard Strauss. He has appeared as a guest internationally, including at the Metropolitan Opera.

== Life and career ==
Kihwan Sim was born in South Korea in 1983. His mother was trained as a singer, and her brother was a voice teacher. The boy sang in the church choir of a Protestant church, and later in a vocal ensemble of ten male singers. He took voice lessons from age 18, and began a year later to study voice at the Yonsei University in Seoul, He had to interrupt studies for two years of military service, learning the tuba during that time. While still studying, he performed the title role of Mozart's Le nozze di Figaro. On a recommendation by his professor, he studied further in Germany, at the Musikhochschule Hamburg. In 2009, he was awarded both first prize in the Mirjam Helin International Singing competition of Helsinki, and second prize at the Neue Stimmen competition. He won the 2010 Paris Opera Competition.

Sim made his debut on stage in Germany at the Staatstheater Darmstadt in 2009 while still a student, again as Mozart's Figaro. He had then the chance to join the studio of the Oper Frankfurt in its beginning in 2011, mentored by Erika Wien. Two months later, he won the Concours Régine Crespin competition in Paris, and received an offer from the Opernhaus Zürich. Intendant Bernd Loebe decided to make him stay in Frankfurt, offering him both the title role of Mozart's Le nozze di Figaro and to become a member of the ensemble with the 2012/13 season. His roles there include Gremin in Tchaikovsky's Eugene Onegin, Leporello in Mozart's Don Giovanni, Escamillo in Barrie Kosky's production of Bizet's Carmen, Capellio in Rossini's Bianca e Falliero and Gottardo in La gazza ladra. He performed Verdi roles there including Sparafucile in Rigoletto, Ferrando in Il trovatore, Procida in Les vêpres siciliennes, and in a concert version Oberto and Don Ruy Gomez de Silva in Ernani. He performed as Sarastro in Mozart's Die Zauberflöte, aa Marc in Frank Martin's Le vin herbé, and as Orest in Elektra by Richard Strauss, alongside Aile Asszonyi in the title role in the 1922/23 season. In 2023 he appeared again as Mozart's Figaro in the first production with the new musical director, Thomas Guggeis. A reviewer from the Frankfurter Rundschau noted his sonorous voice paired with extreme mobility as an actor, and described his short aria, challenging the Count to fight, as a hint at the coming French Revolution.

=== As a guest ===
Sim made his debut at the Metropolitan Opera in New York City in 2016 as Colline in Puccini's La bohème, and returned in 2019 as Masetto in Mozart's Don Giovanni, alongside Peter Mattei in the title role. He appeared as Timur in Puccini's Turandot at Opera Steinbruch festival in St. Margarethen, and as Escamillo at the Danish Royal Opera. He sang as a guest at the Royal Opera House in London, the Cologne Opera, the Hungarian State Opera, the Savonlinna Opera Festival, the Bolshoi Theatre in Moscow, the Seoul Arts Center and the Opéra de Nice.
