= Michael Park School =

Location
- 55 Amy Street, Auckland, New Zealand; 36°53′35″S 174°48′55″E

Information
- Type: State-integrated co-educational (NE, Year 1–13)
- Motto: Receive the Child in Reverence, Educate him in love, Let him go forth in Freedom
- Established: 1979
- Ministry of Education Institution no.: 424
- Enrolment: 317 (July 2026)
- Socio-economic decile: 8P
- Website: www.michaelpark.school.nz

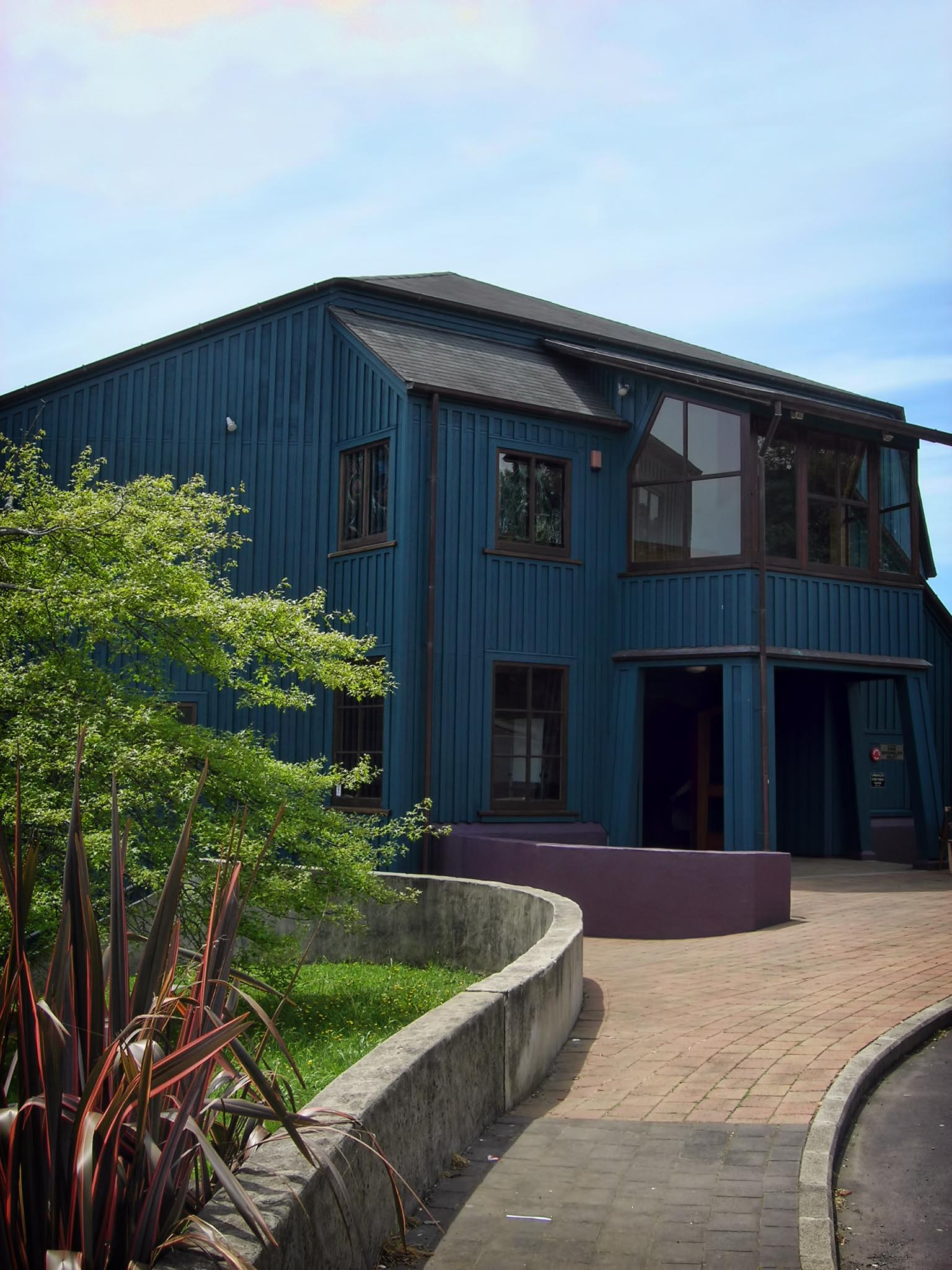
Michael Park Rudolf Steiner School in Auckland

Michael Park School is a Waldorf school in Auckland, New Zealand. It was established in 1979 on the present site, beginning with a kindergarten and lower school classes. It now accepts pupils aged 2 to 18, in playgroup, nursery, kindergarten, lower school and high school.

== Steiner's philosophy ==
The Steiner philosophy encourages a slightly later development than most state education, and a creative environment. The school has a policy of not using IT devices in classes for younger children.

== Qualifications ==
This is a state-integrated school, largely funded by government subsidies. Students can participate in both the government standard assessment, NCEA, as well as the Steiner School Certificate. Currently the Steiner School Certificate is offered at Level 1. In 2011, the school was concerned that plans for national education standards would not fit with the Waldorf policy. Pupils at the school at the time were judged by the Education Review Office (New Zealand) to make good progress.

== Notable alumni ==
Notable alumni of the school include legal academic Professor Alexandra Sims.

== See also ==
- Curriculum of the Waldorf schools
- Anthroposophy
