= Simsim (disambiguation) =

Simsim was a 14th-century state located in the historical territories of modern-day Chechnya and Ingushetia.

Simsim may also refer to:

== Places ==
- The Simsim Caves in the Tarim Basin
- Simsim, Gaza, a Palestinian Arab village depopulated in 1948 in what is today Israel

== Entertainment ==
- Alam Simsim, the Egyptian version of the children's television series Sesame Street
- Iftah Ya Simsim, the Kuwaiti version of Sesame Street
- Shara'a Simsim, the Palestinian version of Sesame Street

== Other ==
- Simsim, the word for sesame in various Semitic languages; also widely used in Arab-influenced East Africa
