= William Edward Sims =

American lawyer

William Edward Sims (May 15, 1842 – July 26, 1891) was an American lawyer.

Sims, son of John Hampton Sims, was born in Sligo, Mississippi, on May 15, 1842. He graduated from Yale College in 1861. On graduation he returned home and soon after enlisted in the 21st Mississippi Regiment, Confederate Army, and served throughout the American Civil War in the Army of Northern Virginia.

Shortly after the war ended, he removed to Eldon, Virginia. He was admitted to the bar in April 1871, and practiced his profession in Chatham, Virginia until 1884. At one time he was a member of the State Executive Committee of the Democratic Party, but he afterwards identified himself with the Republicans and in 1882 was their candidate for US Congress in the Fifth District of Virginia. In 1883, he was the Republican candidate for the Virginia State Senate, and such strong feeling was excited in connection with his campaign on that occasion and the deadly race-related riot which occurred at Danville, that he was compelled to take his family out of the State.

He then went to Washington DC, and in January 1884, was appointed book-keeper of the Senate folding-room. In 1884 he was a delegate to the National Republican Convention, and again in 1888. In June 1886, he returned to Chatham, Va., but spent most of his time in Washington, where he found temporary employment of various kinds, though incapacitated by excessive deafness. In August 1890, he was appointed United States Consul at Colón in what was then part of the Republic of Colombia, He continued in that office until his death there, after two weeks' illness, on July 26, 1891, in his 50th year.

He was married, on October 17, 1865, to Matoaka Whittle, at Eldon, Va., who survived him with their two sons,—an only son having died in infancy.
