= Driving license in Indonesia =

Indonesian driving license Surat Izin Mengemudi
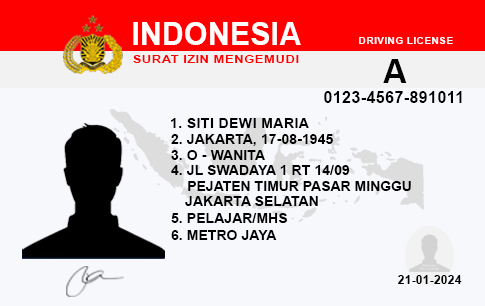
- Specimen of the Indonesian driving license
- Type: Driving license
- Issued by: Indonesian National Police
- Purpose: Authorisation
- Valid in: Indonesia
- Expiration: 5 years (renewable)
- Cost: IDR 50,000 to 120,000

The Indonesian driving license (Indonesian: Surat Izin Mengemudi, abbreviated as SIM) is a legal document required for a person to be allowed to drive a motor vehicle in Indonesia. It is issued by the Indonesian National Police (POLRI), renewable every 5 years, and is valid in all ASEAN member states without an International Driving Permit. Driving license holders are subject to all Indonesian road rules and regulations. There is no provisional driving license in Indonesia.

By definition, the license is considered both proof of registration and valid identification given to someone who has met administrative requirements, is physically and mentally healthy, understands traffic regulations and is qualified to drive a motorized vehicle. The minimum age for a license varies depending on class, starting from 17 for private cars to 23 for commercial heavy vehicles.

== Requirements ==
The requirements for an individual applicant are stated below:

1. Be of age for the intended class
2. Indonesian identity card (KTP)
3. Application form
4. Fingerprint
5. Medical certificate indicating one's physical health
6. Psychological test result indicating one's mental fitness
7. Pass both theory and practical or simulator examination

== Classes ==
The following are the classes of the Indonesian driving license:

Class	Description (Note: including electric vehicles using similar configuration)	Minimum age	Issuance fee	Notes
A	private passenger car or cargo vehicle with maximum allowable weight not exceeding 3,500 kg	17	Rp120,000.-	
B1	private passenger or cargo vehicle with weight allowed exceeding 3,500 kg (Note: also valid for driving a vehicle that requires class A.)	20	Rp120,000.-	Must have Class A for at least one year
B2	private heavy equipment vehicles, towing vehicles, or motor vehicles with semi-trailer or individual trailer with maximum allowable weight exceeding 1,000 kg trailer (Note: also valid for driving a vehicle that requires class A, A Umum, B1, or B1 Umum.)	21	Rp120,000.-	Must have Class B1 for at least one year
A Umum	commercial vehicles and goods carrier with maximum allowable weight not exceeding 3,500 kg	20	Rp120,000.-	For commercial vehicle use only; New applicants must have held the corresponding private class for at least 12 months
B1 Umum	commercial passenger vehicles and general freight with maximum allowable weight exceeding 3,500 kg (Note: also valid for driving a vehicle that requires class A, A Umum, or B1.)	22	Rp120,000.-	For commercial vehicle use only; New applicants must have held the corresponding private class for at least 12 months
B2 Umum	commercial vehicles for towing with semi-trailer or individual trailer with maximum allowable weight exceeding 1,000 kg trailer(s) (Note: also valid for driving a vehicle that requires class A, A Umum, B1, B1 Umum, or B2.)	23	Rp120,000.-	For commercial vehicle use only; New applicants must have held the corresponding private class for at least 12 months
C	any motorcycles with engine cylinder capacity not exceeding 250 cc	17	Rp100,000.-	
C1	any motorcycles with engine cylinder capacity between 250 cc and 500 cc (Note: also valid for driving a vehicle that requires class C.)	18	Rp100,000.-	Must have Class C for at least one year
C2	any motorcycles with engine cylinder capacity exceeding 500 cc (Note: also valid for driving a vehicle that requires class C or C1.)	19	Rp100,000.-	Must have Class C1 for at least one year
D	special motorcycle for disabled persons	17	Rp50,000.-	
D1	special car for disabled persons	17	Rp50,000.-	

== Violations and penalties ==
Every person who drives a motorized vehicle on the road without a driving license as intended in Article 77 paragraph (1) shall be punished with a maximum imprisonment of 4 (four) months or a maximum fine of Rp1,000,000.- (one million rupiah) Every person who drives a motorized vehicle on the road who cannot show a valid driving license while driving a motorized vehicle described in Article 106 paragraph (5) letter b shall be punished with imprisonment for a maximum of 1 (one) month and/or a fine of a maximum of Rp250,000.- (two hundred and fifty thousand rupiah).

Apart from criminal penalties, imprisonment or fines, perpetrators of traffic crimes may be subject to additional penalties in the form of revocation of their driving license or compensation for losses caused by traffic crimes. Traffic violations on driving licenses are marked by National Police officers by recording them in the Driver Registry database electronically and/or manually. In the event that a traffic violation has reached a value of 12 (twelve) the driving license is temporarily revoked, and if it has reached 18 (eighteen) then the driving license can be revoked as an additional sanction based on a court decision.

== Content ==
=== Identity page ===
Information shown on the front page, with corresponding numbers in bold:

- License class
- License number (from 2024, the NIK will be used)
- Photograph
- Full name **(1)**
- Place and date of birth (dd-mm-yyyy) **(2)**
- Blood type - sex **(3)**
- Residential address **(4)**
- Occupation **(5)**
- Province (police jurisdiction) of registration **(6)**
- Expiry date
- Holders' signature

=== Rear page ===
Information shown on the rear page (translated to English):

ATTENTION:
1. Counterfeiting a driving license (SIM) is in violation of Article 263 KUHP, which may be sentenced to prison at a maximum of 6 years.
2. Traffic violations by the driver are given a weighted mark which is recorded in the data centre of the Indonesian National Police in such categories:

a. Light violation (administrative) is weighted by 1 mark.
b. Medium violation (resulted in traffic disturbance) is weighted by 3 marks.
c. Heavy violation (resulted in a traffic accident) is weighted by 5 marks.

3. For license holders who acted in a cumulative violation of over than 12 marks, the driving license may be revoked or may result in a re-test during the license extension period (Perkap No. 9 of 2012 regarding Driving Licenses).

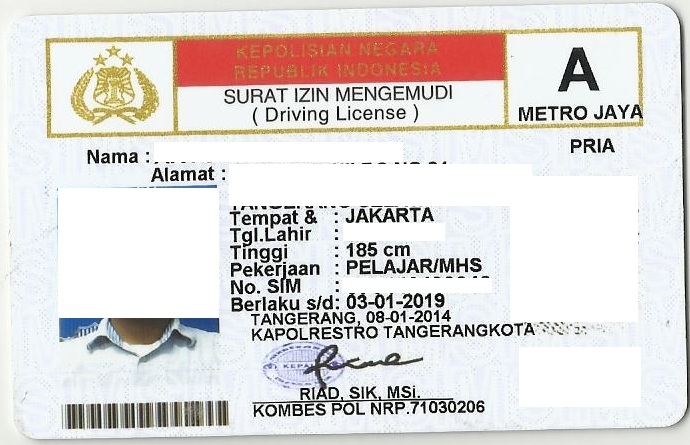
Former design pre-2019

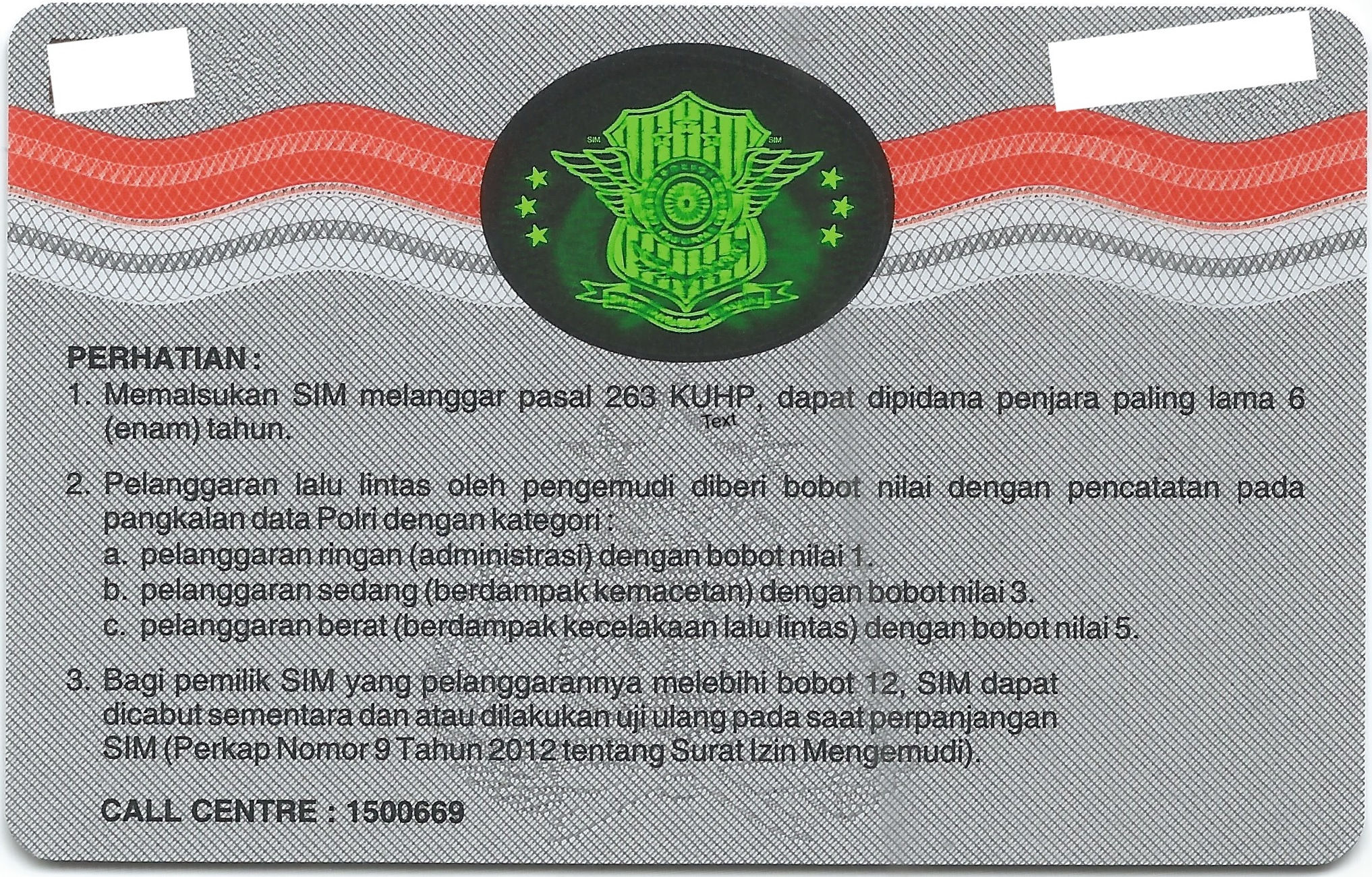
Rear side of the license

== Use overseas / conversions ==
Indonesia is not a party to the 1949 Geneva Convention on Road Traffic. However, the International Driving Permit (IDP) is honored and is issued by the Indonesian National Police. Holders of the Indonesian driving license do not need to acquire an IDP to drive in any ASEAN countries in accordance with The Kuala Lumpur Agreement of 1985; this also applies vice versa whereby citizens of a member state from ASEAN only need to possess a valid driving licence of their respective countries to drive in Indonesia, and do not require any conversions or an IDP.

== See also ==
- Vehicle registration plates of Indonesia
