= Sims Island =

Island of Antarctica

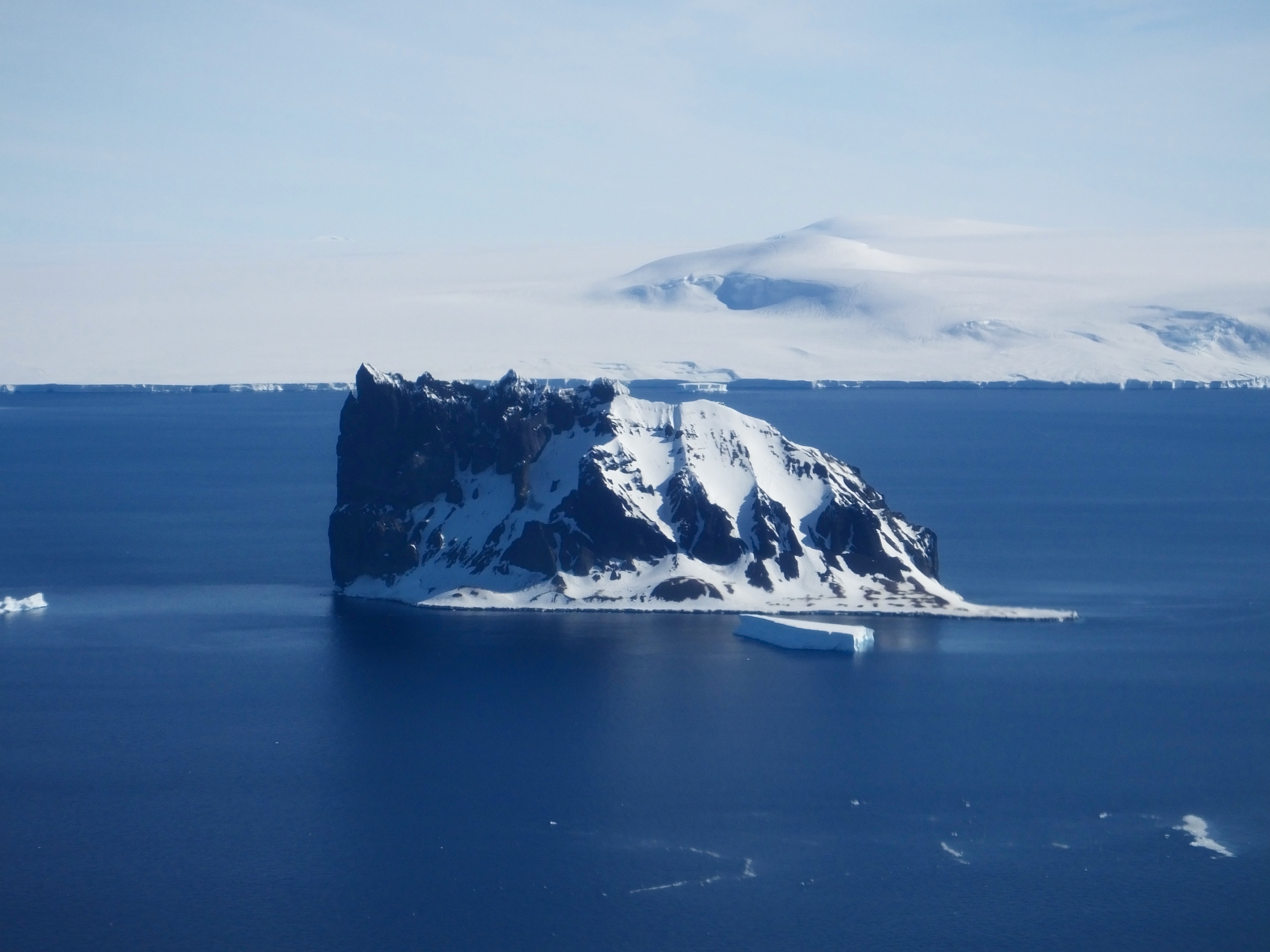
- Sims Island

- Location within Antarctica

Geography
- Location: Palmer Land, Antarctica
- Coordinates: 73°16′37″S 78°32′26″W
- Area: 70 ha (170 acres)
- Length: 1.5 km (0.93 mi)
- Width: 0.8 km (0.5 mi)
- Highest elevation: 380 m (1250 ft)

Administration
- Administered under the Antarctic Treaty System

Demographics
- Population: Uninhabited

Sims Island is a small but conspicuous, largely ice-free, volcanic island lying south of Smyley Island, between the Rydberg Peninsula and Case Island, in the southern part of Carroll Inlet, off the coast of Palmer Land in the Bellingshausen Sea, Antarctica. It was discovered by pilot Ashley Snow of the United States Antarctic Service Expedition (1939–1941) on an aircraft flight on 22 December 1940. It was named for Lieutenant L.S. Sims of the United States Marine Corps (USMC), a surgeon on the expedition.

== Important Bird Area ==
The whole of the 70 ha island has been designated an Important Bird Area (IBA) by BirdLife International because it supports a colony of about 15,000 pairs of Adélie penguins, based on 2012 satellite imagery, which breed along the beach on the north-eastern coast. South polar skuas also breed on the island.

== See also ==
- List of Antarctic and Subantarctic islands
