= Sims Ellison =

- Born: Sims Edgar Ellison; March 10, 1967; San Antonio, Texas, United States
- Died: June 6, 1995 (aged 28) Austin, Texas, United States
- Genres: Alternative, heavy metal, hard rock
- Occupations: Musician, guiatirst
- Instrument: Guitar
- Years active: 1980's–1995
- Formerly of: Pariah

Sims Ellison (March 10, 1967 – June 6, 1995) was an American bassist, who played for Pariah. In 1995, Ellison killed himself due to depression about the music industry. Today there is a charity for local Austin musicians who suffer from mental health and suicidal issues called the Sims Foundation.

== Biography ==
Ellison was born into a San Antonio musical family. He and his brother Kyle formed a heavy metal band in high school called Pariah. After a few albums released with different record labels they signed with Geffen Records in 1991 recording their notable album To Mock A Killingbird that was released in 1993. In May 1995 Geffen Records dumped the band after which Ellison went into a major depression.

== Death ==
On June 6, 1995 Ellison died after he shot himself with a gun in his Austin apartment. He was 28 years old.

== SIMS Foundation ==
The SIMS Foundation was founded by former Pariah manager Wayne Nagle shortly after Sims`death, in honor of him. This charity helps local Austin musicians who have mental health issues by supporting them and their families.

In October 2021, the SIMS Foundation launched a campaign to treat musicians' mental health. The idea first arose in the immediate aftermath of the 2017 Las Vegas shooting and was expanded during the COVID-19 pandemic when, in late 2020, Ellison's father launched The Founders Challenge to address mental health in the musical stage.

== Personal life ==
Ellison dated actress Renée Zellweger for a few years.

== Discography ==
=== Studio albums ===
- 1989 - Rattle Your Skull (Not On Label)
- 1992 - Make Believe (Sick Kids Productions)
- 1993 - To Mock A Killingbird (Geffen Records)

=== Tribute albums ===
- 2015 - It`s All Over Now Baby Blue (SIMS Foundation)
