= Edgar A. Sims =

American politician

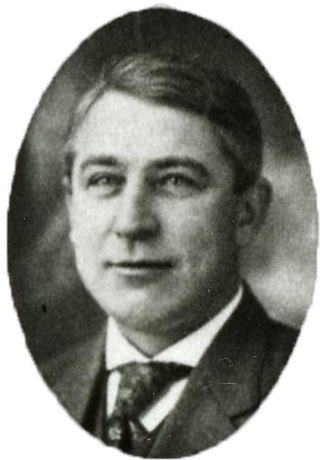
- Sims in 1917

Member of the Washington House of Representatives for the 33rd district
- In office 1909–1917; 1923–1931

Personal details
- Born: March 12, 1875 Winnipeg, Manitoba, Canada
- Died: September 20, 1945 (aged 70) Port Townsend, Washington, United States
- Party: Republican

Edgar Albert Sims (March 12, 1875 – September 20, 1945) was an American politician in the state of Washington. He served in the Washington House of Representatives and Washington State Senate.
