= Steve Sims =

Steve Sims may refer to:

- Steve Sims (footballer) (born 1957), English footballer
- Steve Sims (boxer) (born 1958), Welsh boxer
- Steve Sims (entrepreneur) (born 1966), founder and CEO of the concierge service Bluefish
- Steven Sims (born 1997), American football player
