= Sim (Scottish surname) =

Sim is a surname, and may refer to:

- Alastair Sim (1900–1976), Scottish actor
- George Hamilton Sim (1852–1929), British soldier who played football for the Royal Engineers A.F.C.
- Chea Sim (1932–2015), Chinese-Cambodian politician
- Dave Sim (born 1956), Canadian comic book author
- Gordon Sim, set decorator
- Jon Sim (born 1977), Canadian ice hockey player
- Sheila Sim (1922–2016), English actress
- Thomas Robertson Sim (1858–1938), South African botanist
- Sir William Alexander Sim (1858–1928), New Zealand judge
