= Gareth Sims =

Zimbabwean cricketer (born 1983)

Personal information
- Full name: Gareth Gwilym Sims
- Born: 20 July 1983 (age 43); Harare, Zimbabwe
- Batting: Right-handed
- Bowling: Right-arm off break

Domestic team information
- Years: Team
- 2001/02: Manicaland

Career statistics
Competition	FC
Matches	1
Runs scored	7
Batting average	3.50
100s/50s	0/0
Top score	4
Catches/stumpings	1/–
- Source: ESPNcricinfo, 14 July 2021

Gareth Gwilym Sims (born 20 July 1983) is a former Zimbabwean cricketer. Born in Harare, he played one first-class match for Manicaland during the 2001–02 Logan Cup.
