= Elisabeth Hoemberg =

Canadian historian and writer

Elisabeth Kandal Montague Hoemberg (31 August 1909 – 1994) was a Canadian historian and writer. She married a German professor in 1938 and wrote about her experiences in Münster during the Second World War and the aftermath.

== Early life and education ==
Born Elisabeth Sims in Toronto, daughter of an evangelical Canadian pastor. She studied English and history at the University of Toronto, earning her B.A. in 1931 and her M.A. in 1934. She studied abroad in Paris, Tours, Frankfurt am Main and Berlin through a Gertrud Davis Scholarship for study in Germany. During a study tour in Berlin in 1934/1935, she met her future husband, Albert Karl Hömberg.

== Academic career ==
From 1935 to 1938, she was a lecturer in the Department of Historical Geography at the University of Toronto. On 3 September 1938, she married Albert Hoemberg in Toronto. German nationals were unwelcome in Canada at the outbreak of the Second World War after Hitler's annexation of Austria and the Sudetenland, so the couple moved to Germany in December 1938. Albert, an anti-Nazi professor, was drafted into the Luftwaffe in 1940, served as a map clerk in Paris and Germany, and became a prisoner of war of the Allies in 1945. Although under suspicion, the couple wrote their diaries and corresponded frankly about the progress for the war. These documents were hidden from the Nazis under the doghouse in the garden of their home in the Roxel village of Münster. The bulk of these sources survived and were eventually published. Hoemberg's academic career was interrupted by the birth of her three children (1939, 1941 and 1944). From April 1945 to April 1946, she was the chief interpreter of the British military government of the allied occupation in Münster. From 1946 to 1973 she was a lecturer at the English seminary at the University of Münster. Some years after her husband's early death in 1963, she returned to Canada, where she settled on Halfmoon Bay, British Columbia. She lived her last years on Vancouver Island and died in 1994.

== Significant work ==
Hoemberg's most notable contribution was the publication in 1950 of a book of diaries and letters, "Thy People, My People", about her wartime experiences in Germany. The book was reviewed in England and the U.S., being published in both countries. The diaries and correspondence with her husband were practically the only firsthand records of the wartime experience and grass-roots resistance in Germany to be published in English, and the only one by a Canadian national. The diaries also covered the traumatic first year of postwar occupation and resettlement. In 1956, Dieter Pferdekamp, a student at the Roxel Volksschule, became aware of this book from London telling of the war in Roxel, and later used passages as a source for the teaching of students. Hoemberg had worked on a German translation but encountered considerable resistance from the University administration. The death of her husband and her poor health resulting from wartime hardships and injuries left her without the strength and resources to complete the translation. The book finally was translated by Renate Resing and appeared with notes by Mr. Pferdekamp in 2017, as "Dein Volk ist Mein Volk", published by Aschendorff Verlag.

In her memoirs, Hoemberg portrays dramatic situations such as the crash of a badly injured English pilot and his rescue from a summary execution. In Münster she was constantly under attack by allied bombers throughout the war as well as being under suspicion as an Englishwoman, and endured the ever-present food shortages. Hoemberg, together with a neighbor "Frau Ritter," organized "a small Roxel resistance". She popularized three sermons of Clemens August Graf von Galen against the confiscation of Church goods, the extermination of clericals, and the euthanasia practices of the National Socialists, "words flung from the pulpit of Saint Lamberti which I had stayed up all one night to copy from a furtively borrowed MSS". These were airdropped by the Allies, and distributed in July and August 1941 in Roxel's St. Pantaleon church as well as in Münster's St. Lamberti and Überwasserkirche. A highlight of her work after the war was serving as Cardinal von Galen's interpreter in meetings with the Military Government, and being told by him "Do not hesitate to translate my words literally, it is I who accept the responsibility for them, not you."

The memoirs end with Albert's release from imprisonment and return to their home in Roxel, which had survived the intensive bombing of Münster itself. She translated into English his diaries written on toilet paper during a year in prisoner of war camps, most of which have yet to be published.
