= Brailey Sims =

Australian mathematician

Brailey Sims (born 26 October 1947) is an Australian mathematician born and educated in Newcastle, New South Wales. He received his BSc from the University of Newcastle (Australia) in 1969 and, under the supervision of J. R. Giles, a PhD from the same university in 1972. He was on the faculty of the University of New England (Australia) from 1972 to 1989. In 1990 he took up an appointment at the University of Newcastle (Australia). where he was Head of Mathematics from 1997 to 2000.

He is best known for his work in nonlinear analysis and especially metric fixed point theory and its connections with Banach and metric space geometry, and for his efforts to promote and enhance mathematics at the secondary and tertiary level.

== Publications ==
His most cited publications are:

- Mustafa Z, Sims B. A new approach to generalized metric spaces. Journal of Nonlinear and convex Analysis. 2006 Jan 1;7(2):289. According to Google Scholar, it has been cited 1154 times.
- Kirk WA, Sims B. Handbook of metric fixed point theory. Australian Mathematical Society GAZETTE. 2002;29(2). According to Google Scholar, this article has been cited 604 times
- Mustafa Z, Sims B. Some remarks concerning D-metric spaces. In Proceedings of the International Conference on Fixed Point Theory and Applications 2003 Jul 13 (pp. 189–198). According to Google Scholar, this article has been cited 432 times
- Mustafa Z, Sims B. Fixed point theorems for contractive mappings in complete-metric spaces. Fixed point theory and Applications. 2009 Dec;2009:1-0. According to Google Scholar, this article has been cited 418 times
- Dhompongsa S, Kirk WA, Sims B. Fixed points of uniformly Lipschitzian mappings. Nonlinear analysis: theory, methods & applications. 2006 Aug 15;65(4):762-72. According to Google Scholar, this article has been cited 297 times
