= Sım =

- Municipality
- Location within Azerbaijan
- Coordinates: 38°29′30″N 48°38′56″E
- Country: Azerbaijan
- Rayon: Astara

Population
  - Total: 582
- Time zone: UTC+4 (AZT)
  - Summer (DST): UTC+5 (AZT)

Sim is a village in the administrative territorial unit of Astara district of the Republic of Azerbaijan.

== Gallery ==
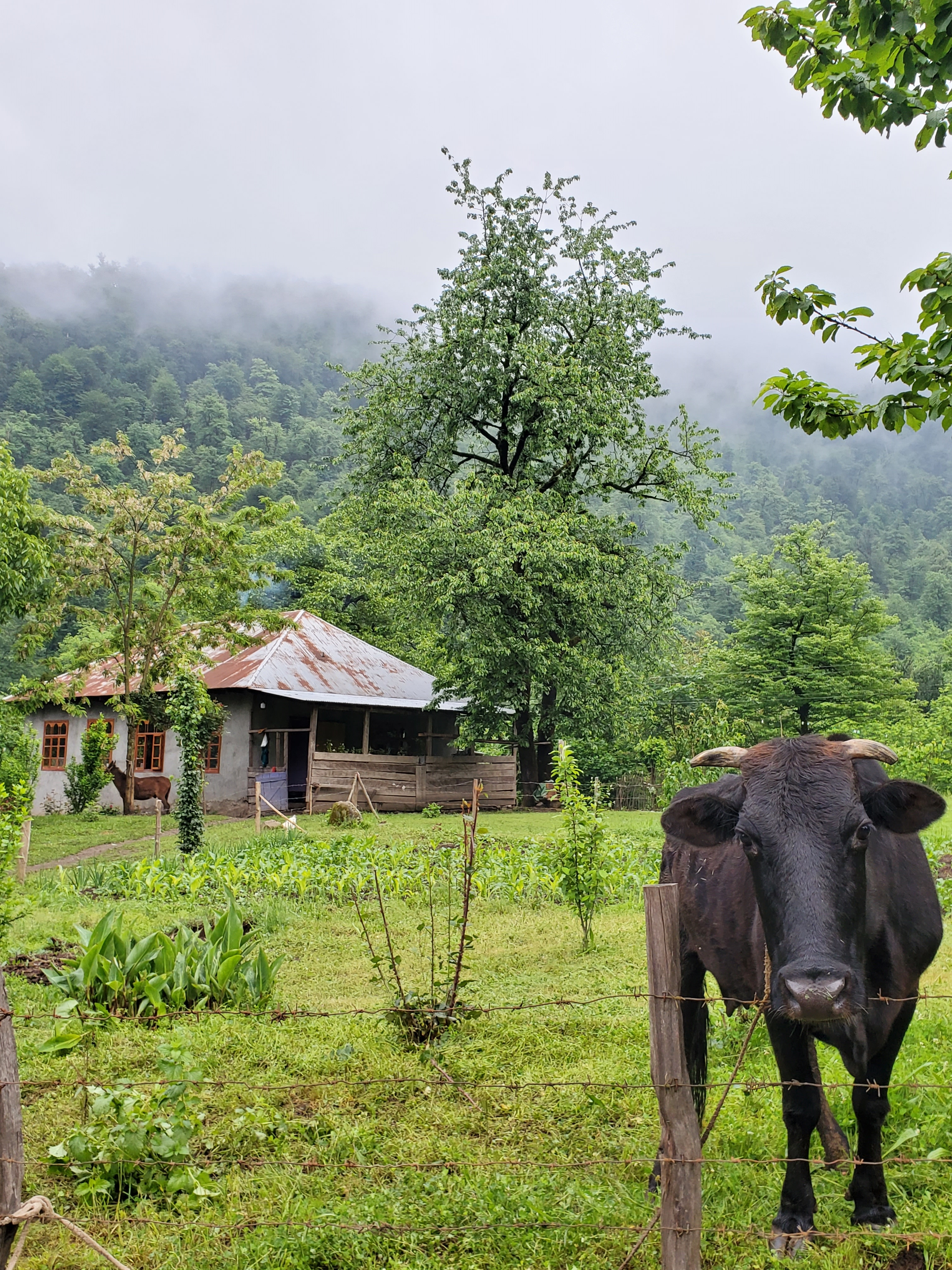

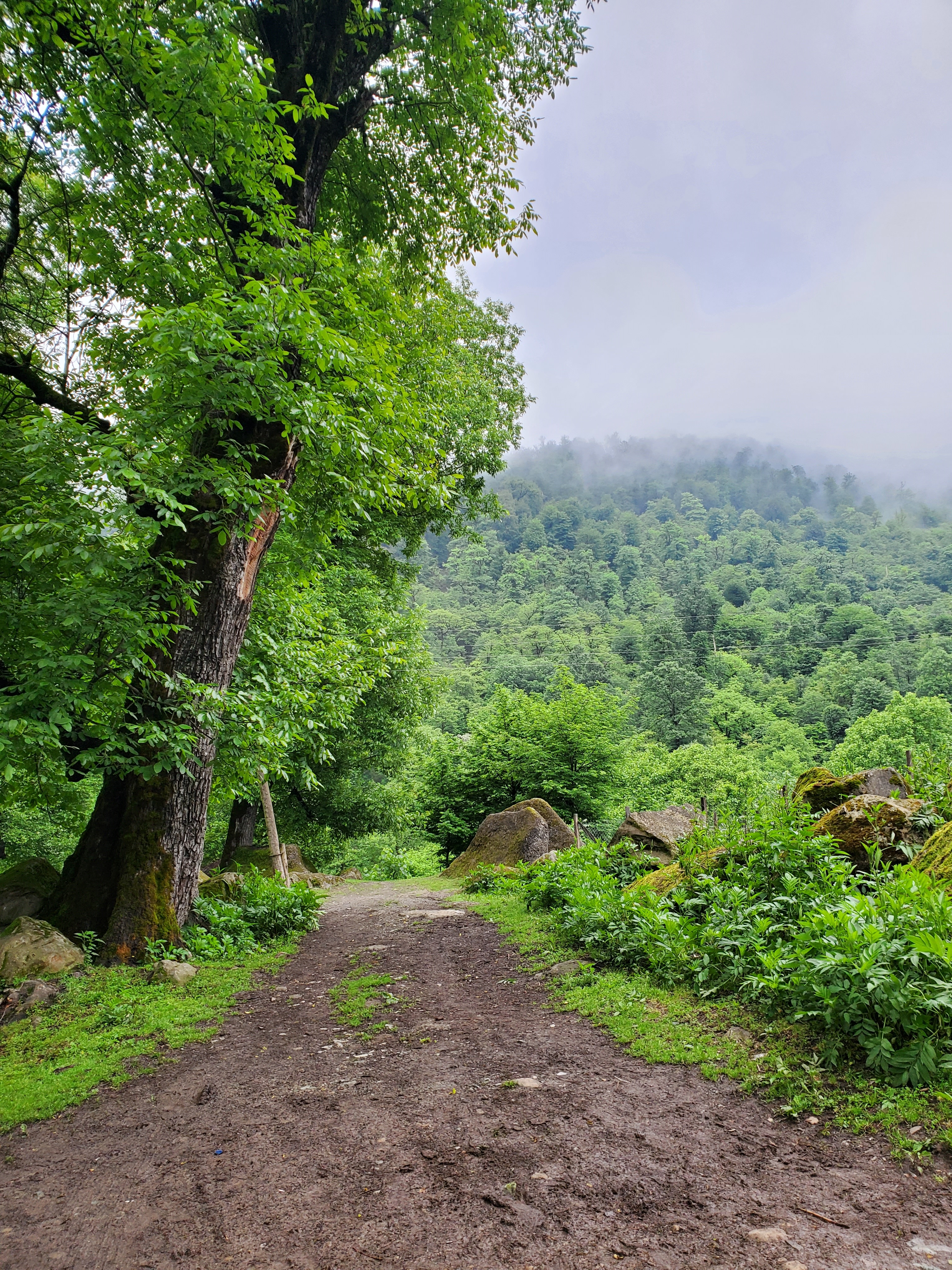

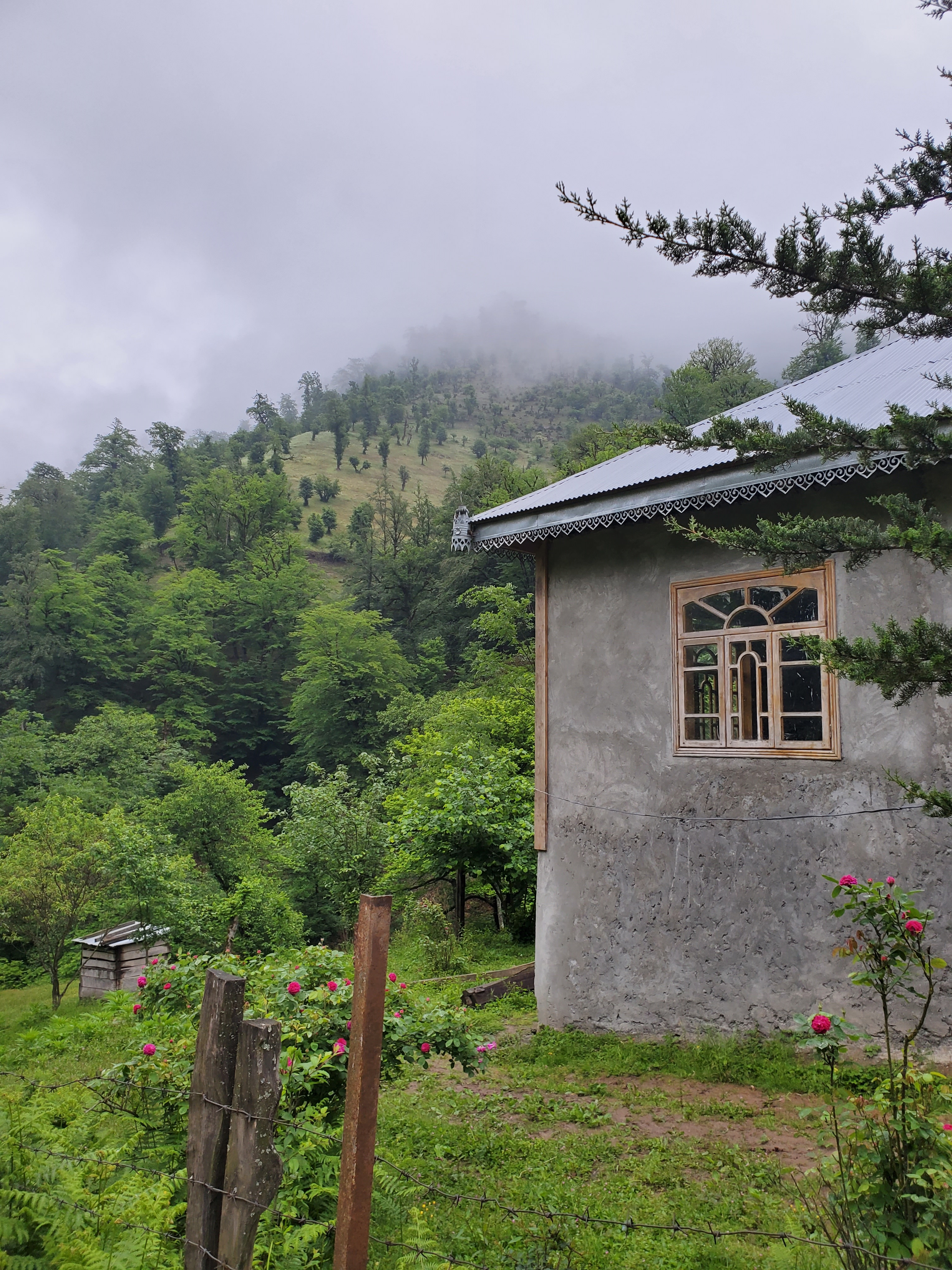

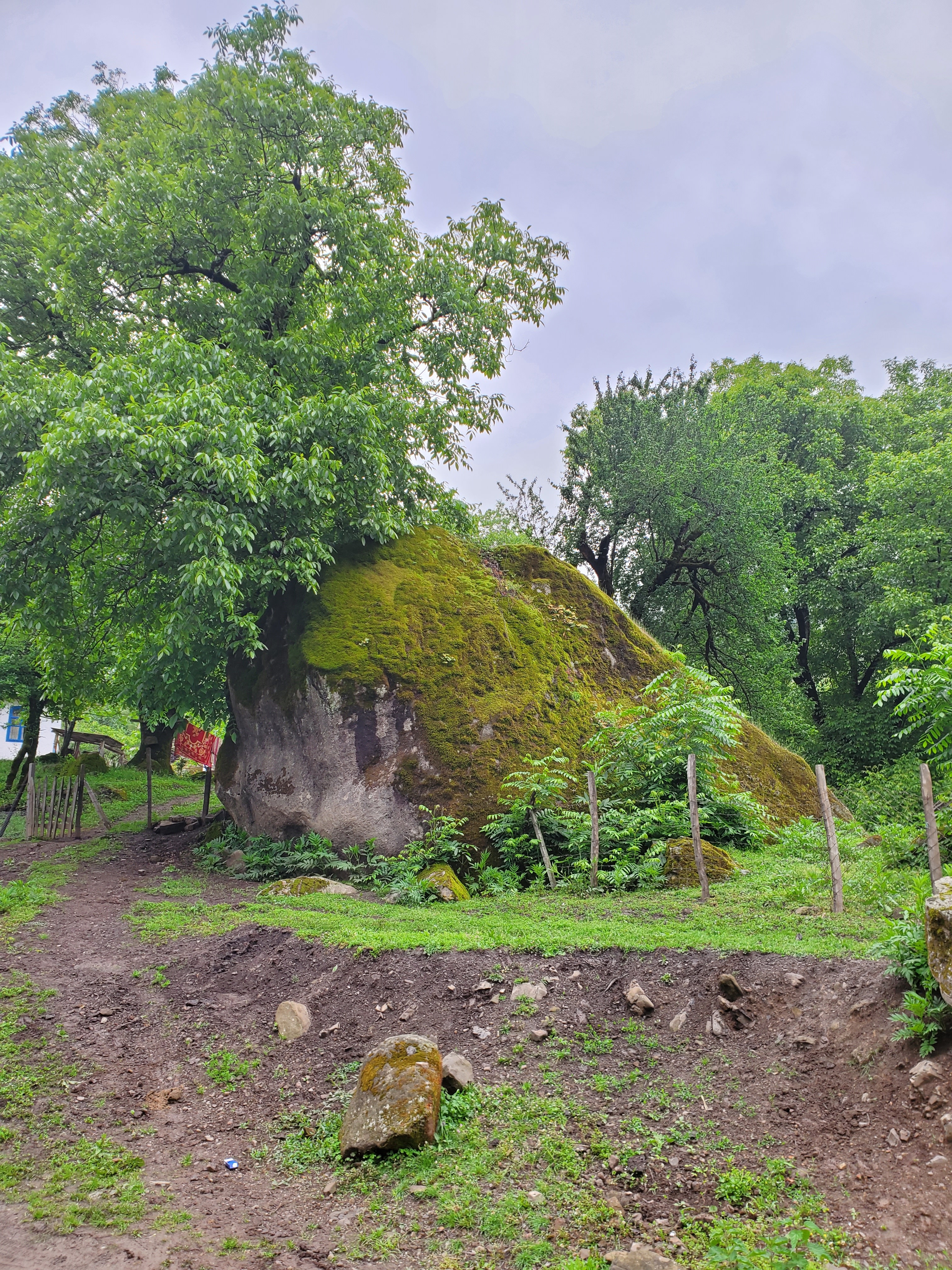

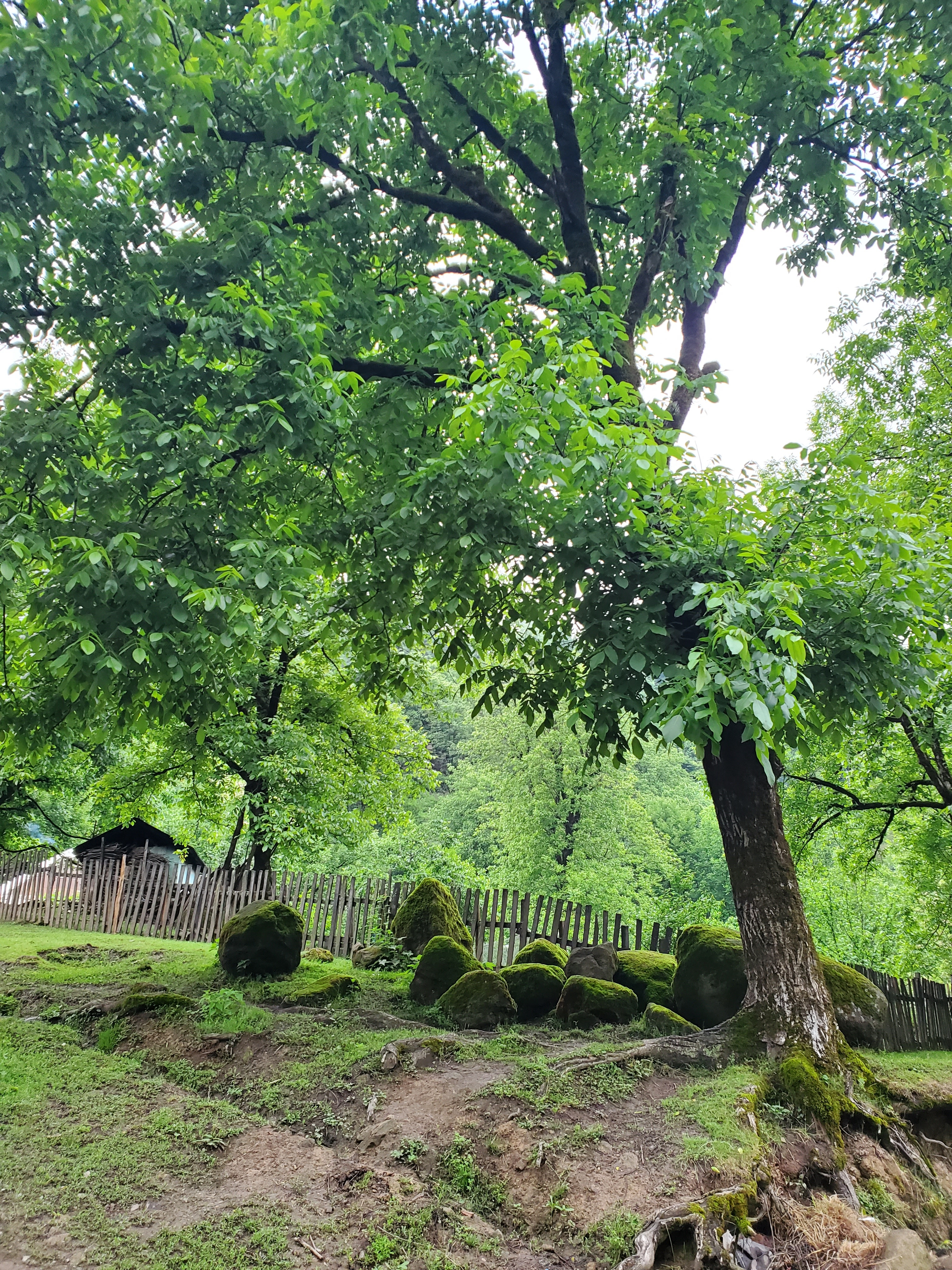

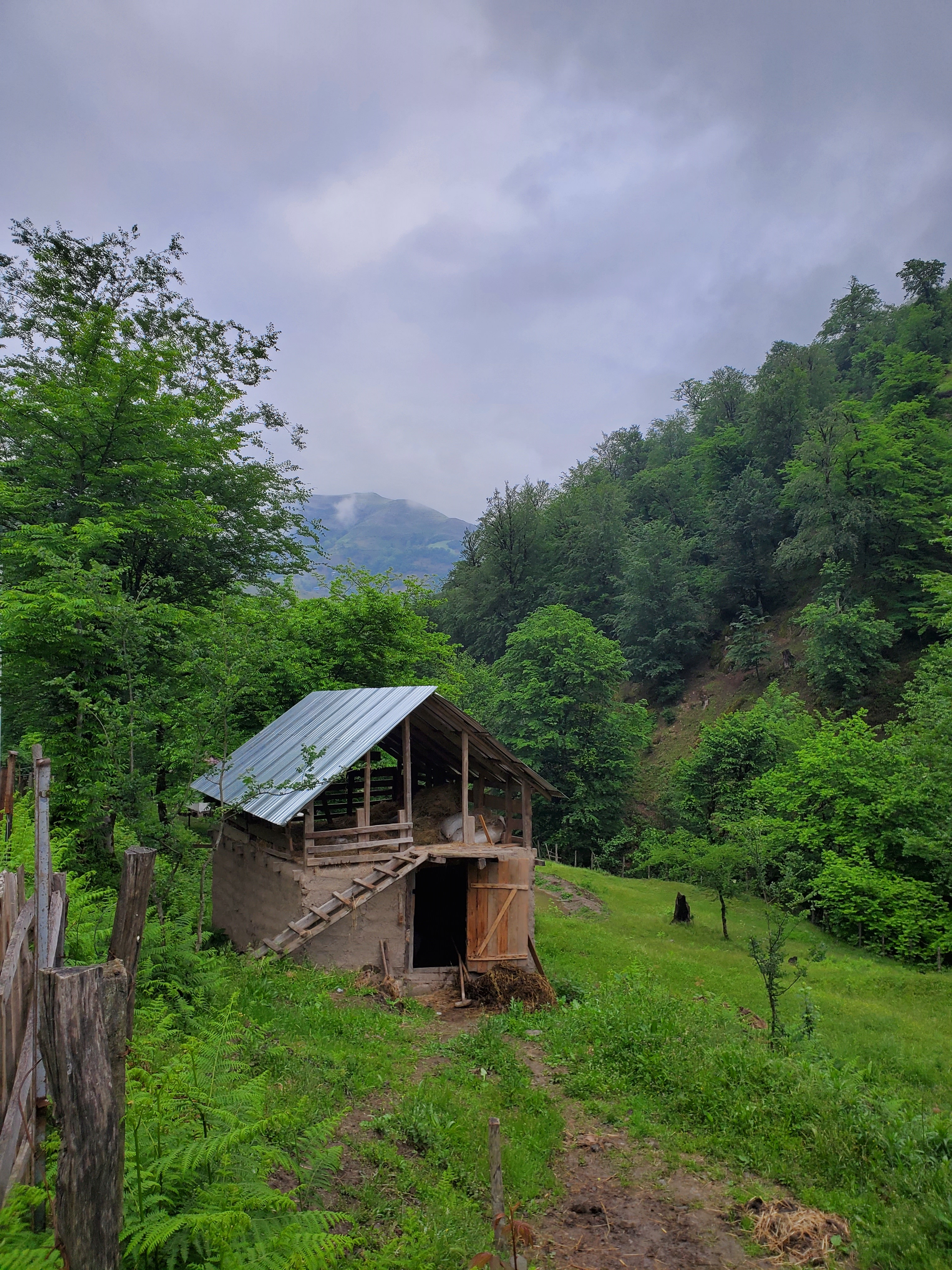

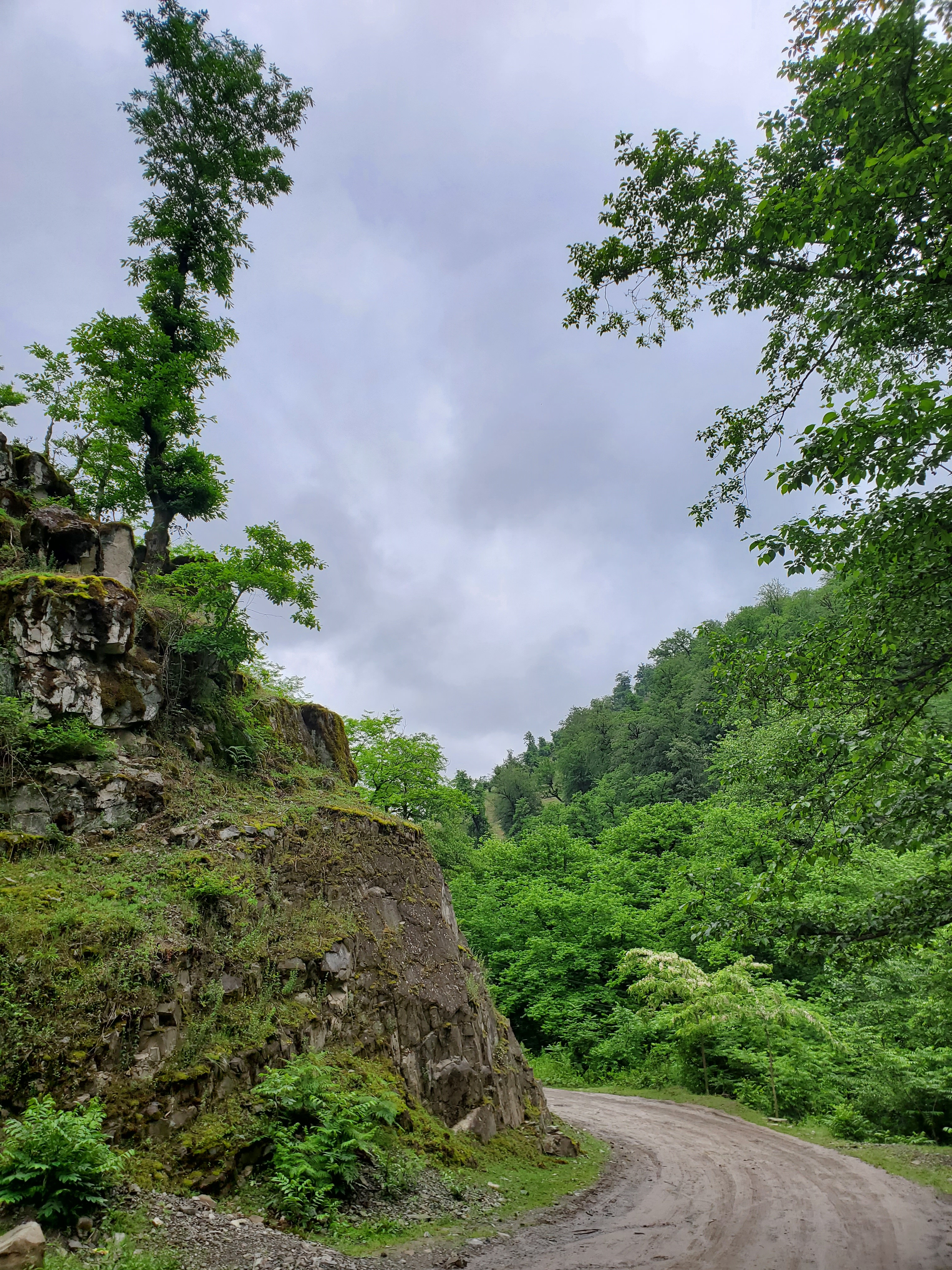

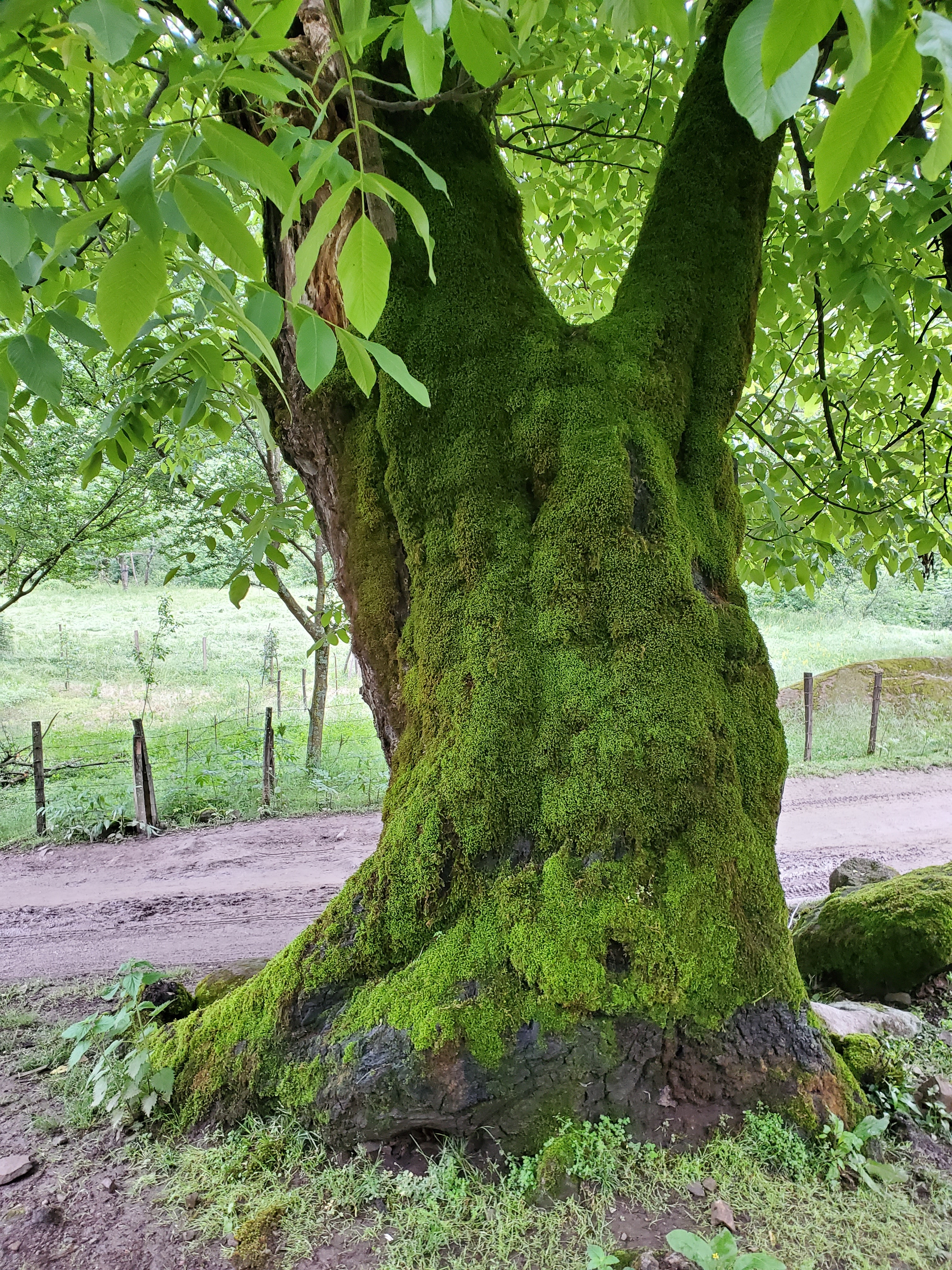
