= Kenneth Sims (geologist) =

American geologist and geochemist

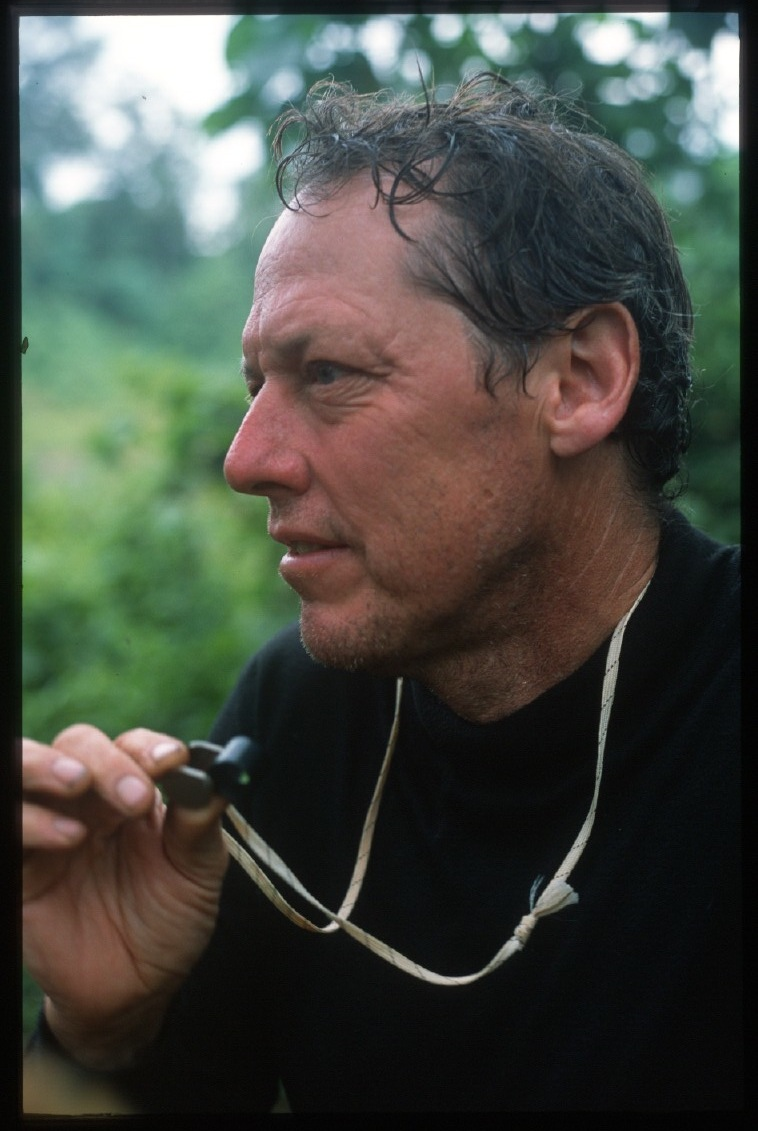
Ken Sims on Nyiragongo in DR Congo on National Geographic Expedition

Kenneth W. W. Sims (born 1959) is an American professor of isotope geology in the Department of Geology and Geophysics at the University of Wyoming. He operates the University of Wyoming High Precision Isotope Laboratory.

== Personal life ==
Sims is married, has two children, and lives in Laramie, Wyoming.

== Research overview ==
Sims is a National Geographic explorer well known for using his technical mountaineering skills to collect geological samples from remote locations across the globe, including sampling molten magma from lava lakes deep within volcanic craters, collecting temporal sequences of lavas from high, technical ridges on the flanks of the world's tallest volcanoes, and using submersibles to obtain mid-ocean ridge basalts from the bottom of the Earth's oceans. Many of these adventures have been featured in National Geographic publications and documentaries, as well as numerous other media venues.

Sims' research endeavors focus on obtaining hard-to-collect samples and then measuring unique and analytically challenging isotope systems to provide otherwise unobtainable answers to societally relevant questions about Earth systems science. His research applies a variety of isotopic techniques (U– and Th– decay series, cosmogenic nuclides, radiogenic isotopes, and non-traditional stable isotopes) to address a wide range of topics in earth and ocean sciences. Sims has published nearly one hundred research articles in peer-reviewed scientific journals, including Nature and Science. These publications cover a wide range of topics: magma genesis, differentiation, and degassing; continental and oceanic crustal construction; planetary accretion and core formation; trace-element partitioning; surficial weathering; paleo-oceanography; chemical oceanography; ground water hydrology; water-rock interaction; fumarolic activity; volcanic aerosol formation and dispersal; serpentinization; natural rates of carbon sequestration; and, shallow subsurface geophysics. Sims' major contributions are determining the time scales and dynamics of magma genesis and volcanic processes.

Sims' research is funded by the US National Science Foundation, National Geographic Society, the US Department of Energy, Woods Hole Oceanographic Institution and the University of Wyoming.

== Career ==
Sims received a B.A. in geology in 1986 from Colorado College, graduating lllCum lllLaude with llHonors. He completed an M.Sc. at the University of New Mexico's Institute of Meteoritics in 1989, where his research focused on chemical fractionation during the formation of the Earth's core and continental crust. His Ph.D. was earned in 1995 from the University of California, Berkeley where his research focused on magma genesis in the Earth's mantle. Sims worked as a student and then as a guest scientist for the Isotope and Nuclear Chemistry Group at the Los Alamos National Laboratory, New Mexico. After completing his Ph.D., he was awarded the Woods Hole Oceanographic Institution (WHOI) Postdoctoral Scholar Fellow from 1995 to 1997. He was then hired onto the WHOI scientific staff in 1997 where he remained as a tenured research scientist until 2009. In 2009 Sims moved to the department of geology and geophysics of the University of Wyoming, where he is now a full professor. He was a Visiting CNRS Fellow at the Institut Universitaire Européen de la Mer (IUEM), France in 2002. In 2016, Sims became a US Fulbright scholar and a visiting professor at the Instituto de Geofisico, Escuela Politécnica Nacional, Quito Ecuador. In his current role at the University of Wyoming, he is involved in a variety of research projects, graduate and undergraduate teaching, and the supervision of graduate students. Sims is the University of Wyoming Organizational Lead for the Yellowstone Volcano Observatory. He has received various academic accolades for his research and public engagement.

Additionally, Sims worked as a professional climbing instructor and high-altitude mountaineering guide for 23 years (1975–1998) including in Antarctica, Alaska, Mexico and Peru. During this period, he pioneered many difficult first ascents around the world.

== Field work ==
Sims' field work, primarily funded by the National Geographic Society and the National Science Foundation (NSF), has crossed the globe from the bottom of the Earth's oceans to the top of its highest volcanoes. Highlights of his field research include the following.

=== Antarctica ===
Sims has been to Antarctica fourteen times since 1989. He has worked both as a guide for science parties funded by the NSF and NASA (including as a guide and rigger for the NASA Dante Rover project), and also as a principal investigator funded by the NSF to conduct research on the volcanoes of Ross Island and Mt Morning. In particular, Sims has worked and published extensively on Mt Erebus, the world's southernmost active volcano, including descending into its active crater numerous times to collect recently erupted lava bombs from its persistent lava lake. His most recent expeditions (2012–2017) have been to study the volcanoes Mt Bird, Mt Terror and Hut Point on Ross Island and also the volcanic cones on Mt Discovery.

=== Democratic Republic of the Congo ===
Sims' expeditions to the Democratic Republic of the Congo were funded by the National Geographic Society to film two documentaries and by NSF for research related to volcano hazard assessment. In his research pursuits, he has trekked deep into the Virunga jungles to access the remote, and often active volcano Nyamulagira, and he repeatedly descended into the active Nyamulagira crater to collect old lava flows from the crater walls and molten magma from the active lava lake.

=== Ecuador ===
Sims has conducted numerous expeditions into the Ecuadorian volcanoes. Funded by the National Geographic Society in 2014, Sims led a month-long expedition into the remote Sangay volcano (5,300 meters/17,400 feet ASL), which is one of the highest and most continuously active volcanoes in the world. In 2016, while living in Ecuador for six months on a US Fulbright Scholarship, Sims conducted several two-week expeditions to collect samples on the steep, glacially dissected flanks and high-altitude ridges of Chimborazo (6,263 meters/20,548 feet ASL). He has also conducted and published NSF- and UW-funded research on the volcanoes Reventador, Sumaco, and the Chalupas Caldera.

=== Mid-ocean ridges ===
Sims has researched the petrology of mid-ocean ridges extensively. He worked on several research expeditions to 9–10°N East Pacific Rise aboard the WHOI-operated Research Vessel (RV) Atlantis, utilizing the U.S. Navy-owned Deep Submergence Vehicle (DSV) Alvin and other remotely operated (DSL-120 and Jason) and autonomous (ABE) vehicles to conduct his research. Sims has also sent his graduate students on research expeditions to the Kolbeinsey Ridge, the SW Indian Ridge, 45°N Mid Atlantic Ridge, and 9°03 East Pacific Rise.

=== Yellowstone ===
Wyoming is home to one of the world's super-volcanos, Yellowstone, which also happens to host the world's most profound, and visually stunning example of an active continental hydrothermal system. Since moving to Wyoming, Sims has been coordinating the introduction of novel geochemical and geophysical techniques to study Yellowstone's "geohydrobiology", which is the study of how Earth, water and life connect.

=== Other locations ===
Sims' research has also taken him to volcanoes in Italy (Mt. Etna and Stromboli), Nicaragua (Vulcan Masaya), Iceland (Hekla, Theistareykir, Krafla), Hawaii (Kilauea, Mauna Loa, Hualalai, Mauna Kea and Haleakala), and New Mexico (Jemez Volcanic Field, Zuni-Bandera, and Raton-Clayton Volcanic Field). Sims has worked on problems related to serpentinization and carbonization in Samail Ophiolite of Oman, and the Josephine Peridotite in Oregon.

== Public engagement ==
Sims' research and scientific expeditions have been featured in National Geographic Magazine (October 2004; April 2011); GEO Magazine (October 2012; 2017); National Geographic Explorer Kids (October 2011); Oceanus (Fall, 2006); Popular Mechanics (October 2006); New Scientist (July 2008; December 2008); CNN ("Great Big Story"); MentalFloss (August 2013); the children's book Lava Scientists: Careers on the Edge of Volcanoes (Sarah Latta, Enslow Publishing, Inc.); National Geographic Television ("Man versus Volcano", April 2011; "One Strange Rock", March 2018); National Geographic Weekend Radio (January 2015); Discovery Channel ("Against the Elements", Spring 2009; "Volcano Time Bomb", December 2012); NHK Japanese Public Television (Miracle Continent Antarctica); and, Boston Museum of Science ("Volcanoes on the Verge"). Sims contributes regularly to the National Geographic Explorers blog.

== Awards and recognition ==
- Fulbright US Scholar Award (2016–2017)
- Top 10 Teacher Award, University of Wyoming (2015)
- Extraordinary Merit in Research Award, University of Wyoming (2015)
- National Geographic Society Explorer
- Faculty Senate Speaker Award, University of Wyoming (2014)
- Meritorious Teaching Award, University of Wyoming (2014)
- Papadopoulos Fellow, Kincaid School, Houston, Texas (2012)
- Mellon Independent Study Awards, Woods Hole Oceanographic Institution (1999, 2001, 2006, 2008)
- Outstanding Graduate Student Instructor, University of California, Berkeley (1992)
- Estwing Outstanding Senior Geologist, Colorado College (1986)
- Getty Oil Fellowship, Colorado College (1984)

== Significant publications ==
*Authors marked with an asterisk are graduate students working with Sims.

=== Mantle dynamics and magma genesis ===
- Sims, K.W.W., S.J. Goldstein, J. Blichert-Toft, M.R. Perfit, P. Kelemen, D.J. Fornari, P. Michael, M.T. Murrell, S.R. Hart, D.J. DePaolo, G.D. Layne, and M. Jull (2002). "Chemical and isotopic constraints on the generation and transport of melt beneath the East Pacific Rise." Geochimica et Cosmochimica Acta, 66, 19, 3481–3504. doi:10.1016/S0016-7037(02)00909-2.
- Sims, K.W.W., M.T. Murrell, D.J. DePaolo, W.S. Baldridge, S.J. Goldstein, D. Clague and M. Jull (1999). "Porosity of the melting zone and variations in the solid mantle upwelling rate beneath Hawaii: Inferences from ^{238}U–^{230}Th–^{226}Ra and ^{235}U-^{231}Pa disequilibria." Geochimimica et Cosmochimica Acta, 63, 23, 4119–4138, doi: 10.1016/S0016-7037(99)00313-0.
- Sims, K.W.W. and D.J. DePaolo (1997). "Inferences about mantle magma sources from incompatible element concentration ratios in oceanic basalts." Geochimica et Cosmochimica Acta, 61, 4, 765–784. doi: 10.1016/S0016-7037(96)00372-9.
- Sims, K.W.W., D.J. DePaolo, M.T. Murrrell, W.S. Baldridge, S.J. Goldstein, and D. Clague (1995). "Mechanisms of magma generation beneath Hawaii and Mid–Ocean ridges: U–Th and Sm–Nd isotopic evidence." Science, 267, 508–512. doi: 10.1126/science.267.5197.508.
- Sims, K.W.W., J. Blichert-Toft, P.R. Kyle, S. Pichat, J. Bluzstajn, P.J. Kelly, L.A. Ball, and G. D. Layne (2008). "A Sr, Nd, Hf, and Pb isotope perspective on the genesis and long-term evolution of alkaline magmas from Erebus volcano, Antarctica." Invited article to special volume on Mt. Erebus in Journal of Volcanology and Geothermal Research, 177, 606–618. doi: 10.1016/j.jvolgeores.2007.08.006.
- Sims, K.W.W., J. Maclennan, J. Blichert-Toft, E.M. Mervine, J. Bluzstajn, and K. Grönvold (2013). "Short length scale mantle heterogeneity beneath Iceland probed by glacial modulation of melting." Earth and Planetary Science Letters, 379, 146–157, doi.org/10.1016/j.epsl.2013.07.027.
- *Waters, C.L., K.W.W. Sims, M.R. Perfit, J. Blichert-Toft, and J. Blusztajn (2011). "Perspective on the genesis of E-MORB from Chemical and Isotopoic Heterogeneity at 9–10ºN East Pacific Rise." Journal of Petrology, 52, 3, 565–602. doi:10.1093/petrology/egq091.
- *Elkins, L.J., K.W.W. Sims, J. Prytulak, T. Elliott, N. Mattielli, J. Blichert-Toft, J. Blusztajn, C. Devey, D. Mertz, J.-G. Schilling, and M. Murrell (2011). "Understanding melt generation beneath the slow-spreading Kolbeinsey Ridge using ^{238}U, ^{230}Th, and ^{231}Pa excesses." Geochimica et Cosmochimica Acta, 75, 21, 6300–6329. doi:10.1016/j.gca.2011.08.020.

=== Oceanic crustal construction ===
- Sims, K.W.W., J. Blichert-Toft, D.J. Fornari, M.R. Perfit, S.J. Goldstein, P. Johnson, D.J. DePaolo, and P. Michaels (2003). "Aberrant Youth: Chemical and isotopic constraints on the young off-axis lavas of the East Pacific Rise." Geochemistry, Geophysics, Geosystems, 4, 10, 8621, doi:10.1029/2002GC000443.
- Sims, K.W.W., S.R. Hart, M.K. Reagan, J. Blusztajn, H. Staudigel, R.A. Sohn, G.D. Layne, L.A. Ball and J. Andrews (2008). "^{238}U-^{230}Th-^{226}Ra-^{210}Pb-^{210}Po, ^{232}Th-^{228}Ra and ^{235}U-^{231}Pa constraints on the ages and petrogenesis of Vailulu and Malumalu Lavas, Samoa." Geochemistry, Geophysics, Geosystems, 9, Q04003. doi:10.1029/2007GC001651.
- *Waters, C.L., K.W.W. Sims, E.M. Klein, S.M. White, M.K. Reagan, and G. Girard (2013). "Sill to Surface: Linking Young Off-Axis Volcanism with Subsurface Melt at the Overlapping Spreading Center at 9º03'N East Pacific Rise." Earth and Planetary Science Letters, 369–370, 59–70. doi.org/10.1016/j.epsl.2013.03.006.
- *Standish, J.J. and K.W.W. Sims (2010). "Young Volcanism and Rift Valley Construction at an Ultraslow Spreading Ridge." Nature Geoscience, 3, 4, 286–292. doi: 10.1038/NGEO824.
- Sohn, R.A. and K.W.W. Sims (2005). "Bending as a mechanism for triggering off-axis volcanism on the East Pacific Rise." Geology, 33, 2, 93–96. doi: 10.1130/G21116.1.
- *Waters, C.L., K.W.W. Sims, S.A. Soule, J. Blichert-Toft, N.W. Dunbar, T. Plank, R.A. Sohn, and M.A. Tivey (2013). "Recent Volcanic Accretion at 9–10ºN East Pacific Rise as Resolved by Combined Geochemical and Geological Observations." Geochemistry, Geophysics, Geosystems, 14. doi: 10.1002/ggge.20134.

=== Shallow magmatic processes ===
- Sims, K.W.W., S. Pichat, M.K. Reagan, P.R. Kyle, H. Dulaiova, N. Dunbar, J. Prytulak, G. Sawyer, G. Layne, J. Blichert-Toft, P.J. Gauthier, M.A. Charrette, and T.R. Elliott (2013). "On the timescales of magma genesis, melt evolution, crystal growth rates and magma degassing in the Erebus volcano magmatic system using the ^{238}U, ^{235}U- and ^{232}Th-decay series." Journal of Petrology, 54, 2, 235–271. doi: 10.1093/petrology/egs068.
- Reagan, M.K., K.W.W. Sims, J. Enrich, R.B. Thomas, H. Cheng, R.L. Edwards, G.D. Layne, and L.A. Ball (2003). "Time-scale of differentiation from mafic parents to rhyolite in North American continental arcs." Journal of Petrology, 44, 9, 1703–1726. doi: 10.1093/petrology/egg057
- Giammanco, S., K.W.W. Sims, and S.M. Neri (2007). "Shallow rock stresses and gas transport at Mt. Etna (Italy) monitored through ^{220}Rn, ^{222}Rn and soil CO_{2} emissions in soil and fumaroles." Geochem., Geophys., Geosys, 8, Q10001. doi:1029/2007GC00164.
- *Chakrabarti, R., K.W.W. Sims; A.R Basu; M. Reagan; and J. Durieux (2009). "Timescales of Magmatic Processes and Eruption Ages of the Nyiragongo volcanics from ^{238}U -^{230}Th-^{226}Ra-^{210}Pb disequilibria." Earth and Planetary Science Letters, 288, 149–157. doi:10.1016/j.epsl.2009.09.017.
- Reubi, O., K.W.W. Sims, and B. Bourdon (2014). "^{238}U-^{230}Th equilibrium in arc magmas and implications for the time scales of mantle metasomatism." Earth and Planetary Science Letters, 391, 146–158, doi.org/10.1016/j.epsl.2014.01.054.
- Reubi, O. K.W.W. Sims, N. Varley, M. Reagan, and J. Eikenberg (2015) Timescales of degassing and conduit dynamics inferred from 210Pb-226Ra disequilibria in Volcan de Colima 1998–2010 andesitic magmas" (Caricchi, L. & Blundy, J. D. (eds) Chemical, Physical and Temporal Evolution of Magmatic Systems. Geological Society, London, Special Publications, 422, http://doi.org/10.1144/SP422.5).
- Cooper, K., K.W.W. Sims, J.M. Eiler, N. Banerjee, (2016) Time scales of storage and recycling of crystal mush at Krafla Volcano, Iceland. Contributions to Mineralogy and Petrology, 171, 6, 54. doi 10.1007/s00410-016-1267-3.
- Garrison, J. M., K.W.W. Sims, G.M Yogodzinski, R. D. Escobar, S. Scott, P. Mothes, Patricia, M. L. Hall, P. Ramon (2018) Shallow-level differentiation of phonolitic lavas from Sumaco Volcano, Ecuador. Contributions to Mineralogy and Petrology, 173, 6. DOI: 10.1007/s00410-017-1431-4).

=== Ocean chemistry and processes ===
- Pichat, S., K.W.W. Sims, R. François, J.F. McManus, S. Brown-Legger, and F. Albarède (2004). "Lower export production during glacial periods in the equatorial Pacific as derived from (^{231}Pa/^{230}Th) measurements in deep-sea sediments." Paleoceanography, 19, 4023. doi: 10.1029/2003PA000994.
- *Owens, S.A., K.O. Buesseler, K.W.W.Sims (2011). "Re-evaluating the ^{238}U-salinity relationship in seawater: Implications for the ^{238}U-^{234}Th disequilibrium method." Marine Chemistry, 127, 1–4, 20, Pages 31–39. doi:10.1016/j.marchem.2011.07.005.
- *Arendt C.A. S.M. Aciego, K. W. W. Sims, S B. Das, C. Sheik, E. I. Stevenson (2018) Greenland subglacial water and proximal seawater U chemistry: Implications for seawater δ^{234}U on glacial-interglacial timescales. Geochimica et Cosmochimica Acta, 225, 102–115, doi.org/10.1016/j.gca.2018.01.007.

=== Crustal dynamics and processes ===
- Sims, K.W.W., R.P. Ackert Jr., F. Ramos, R.A. Sohn, M.T. Murrell, and D. J. DePaolo (2007). "Determining eruption ages and erosion rates of Quaternary basaltic volcanism from combined U-series disequilibria and cosmogenic exposure ages." Geology, 35, 471–474, doi:10.1130/G23381A.1.
- *Mervine, E.M., K.W.W. Sims, S.E. Humphris, and P.B. Kelemen (2015). "The applications and limitations of U-Th disequilbria systematics for determining rates of peridotite carbonation in the Samail Ophiolite, Sultanate of Oman." Chemical Geology, 412, 151–166, .org/10.1016/j.chemgeo.2015.07.023
- *Arendt, C.A. S. M. Aciego, K.W.W. Sims, and S. M. Aarons (2017) Seasonal Progression of Uranium Series Isotopes in Subglacial Meltwater: Implications for Subglacial Storage Time. Chemical Geology, 467, 42–52, https://doi.org/10.1016/j.chemgeo.2017.07.007.
- *Scott, S.R., K. W.W. Sims, B. R. Frost, P. B. Kelemen, K. A. Evans, and S. Swapp (2017) On the hydration of olivine in ultramafic rocks: Implications from Fe isotopes in serpentinites" (Geochemica Cosmochimica Acta, 215, 105–215, https://doi.org/10.1016/j.gca.2017.07.011

=== Core formation and planetary differentiation ===
- Newsom, H.E. and K.W.W. Sims (1991). "Core formation during early accretion of the Earth." Science, 252, 926–933. doi: 10.1126/science.252.5008.926.
- Sims, K.W.W., H.E. Newsom, and E.S. Gladney (1990). "Chemical fractionation during formation of the Earth's core and continental crust: Clues from As, Sb, W and Mo." In Origin of the Earth, J. Jones and H.E. Newsom (eds.), New York: Oxford University Press; Houston. Lunar and Planetary Institute. ISBN 0-19-506619-7.
- Newsom, H.E., K.W.W. Sims, P.D. Noll, W.L. Jaeger, S.A. Maehr, and T.B. Bassera (1996). "The depletion of W in the bulk-silicate Earth: constraints on core formation." Geochimica et Cosmochimica Acta, 60, 7, 1155–1169. doi: 10.1016/0016-7037(96)00029-4.

=== Development of novel analytical protocols ===
- Sims, K.W.W., J. Gill, A. Dossetto, D. Hoffmann, C.C. Lundstom, R. Williams, L.A. Ball, D. Tollstrup, S.P. Turner, J. Prytulak, J. Glessner, J.J. Standish, and T. Elliott (2008). "An inter-laboratory assessment of the Th Isotopic Composition of Synthetic and Rock standards." Geostandards and Analytical Research, 32, 1, 65–91. doi: 10.1111/j.1751-908X.2008.00870.x.
- Ball, L.A., K.W.W. Sims, and J. Schwieters (2008). "Measurement of ^{234}U/^{238}U and ^{230}Th/^{232}Th in volcanic rocks using the Neptune PIMMS." Journal Analytical Atomic Spectrometry, 23, 173–180. doi: 10.1039/b703193a.
- Layne, G.D. and K.W.W. Sims (2000). "Analysis of ^{232}Th/^{230}Th in volcanic rocks by Secondary Ionization Mass Spectrometry." International Journal of Mass Spectrometry, 203, 1–3, 187–198.
- Dulaiova, H., K.W.W. Sims, and M.A. Charette (2013). "A new method for the determination of low-level actinium-227 in geological samples." Journal of RadioAnalytical and Nuclear Chemistry, 296, 279–283. doi:10.1007/s10967-012-2140-0.)
- Lane-Smith, D. and K.W.W. Sims (2013). "The effect of CO_{2} on the measurement of ^{220}Rn and ^{222}Rn, with instruments utilizing electrostatic precipitation." Acta Geophysica, 61, 4, 822–830 (Special volume on Geo-Hazards; Guest editor: Rakesh Chand Ramola) doi: 10.2478/s11600-013-0107-3.
- Sims, K.W.W., and E.S. Gladney (1991). "Determination of As, Sb, W and Mo in silicate matrices by epithermal neutron activation and inorganic ion exchange." Analytica Chimica Acta, 251, 297–303. doi: 10.1016/0003-2670(91)87150-6.
- Sims, K.W.W., E.S. Gladney, C.C. Lundstrom, and N.W. Bower (1988). "Elemental concentrations in Japanese silicate rock standards: a comparison with the literature." Geostandards Newsletter, 12, 379–389.
- Choi, M.S., R. Francois, K.W.W. Sims, M.P. Bacon, S. Legger-Brown, A.P. Fleer, L.A. Ball, D. Schneider, and S. Pichat (2001). "Rapid determination of ^{230}Th and ^{231}Pa in seawater by Inductively coupled plasma mass spectrometry." Marine Chemistry, 76, 99–112.
