= Boldmere =

Coordinates: 52.54°N 1.83°W

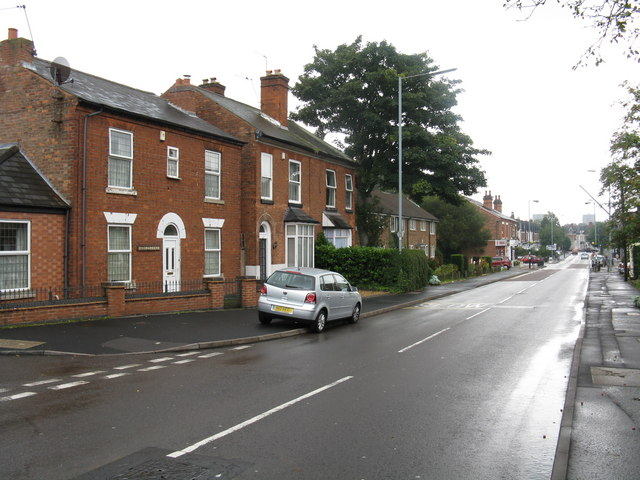
- Boldmere Road

- Location within the West Midlands
- OS grid reference: SP109940
- Metropolitan borough: Birmingham
- Metropolitan county: West Midlands
- Region: West Midlands
- Country: England
- Sovereign state: United Kingdom
- Post town: SUTTON COLDFIELD
- Postcode district: B73
- Dialling code: 0121
- Police: West Midlands
- Fire: West Midlands
- Ambulance: West Midlands
- UK Parliament: Sutton Coldfield

Boldmere is a suburb and residential area of Sutton Coldfield, City of Birmingham, England. It is bordered by New Oscott, Sutton Park, Wylde Green and Erdington, and is in the ward of Sutton Vesey.

== History ==
=== Toponymy ===
"Boldmere" is a corruption of the word "Baldmoor", coming from the Middle English bald (meaning "a white patch") and the Anglo-Saxon moor (meaning "boggy land"). Therefore, Boldmere literally means a "bald moor"; a treeless patch. Bald (meaning "bold") was also a personal name used by the Anglo-Saxons.

==== Name history ====
At the time of John Speed's 1610 atlas The Theatre of the Empire of Great Britaine, Boldmere was known as Cofield Wast. The area was described as "an open, wild and windy expanse, covered with gorse".

The United Kingdom Census of 1841 refers to the area as Baldmoor Lake, which was once a body of water south of the Chester Road. The lake has also been known as Bowen Pool, Baldmoor, and Bolemore Lake, though no lake is shown on Speed's map of 1610 (nor on other later maps). The census did, however, list a dwelling on the Chester Road as "Lake House". There is, however, a Lakehouse Road and Baldmoor Lake Road in the area.

By 1856, the area had become known as The Coldfield, a name which lasted at least until the introduction of the railway.

=== Expansion ===
On introduction of the 1825 inclosure act, the area saw little expansion due to common land becoming privately owned. The 1841 census listed eight families in the area, including agricultural workers, a painter, an Irish carrier, and a wire drawer. It is likely that the latter worked at Penns Mill, a nearby wire mill run by Joseph Webster III.

Boldmere did expand, however, upon the introduction of the London and North Western Railway. Two stations opened in the region at Wylde Green and Chester Road, in 1862 and 1863 respectively.

A second housing boom occurred in the 1930s, with both private and council housing being built.

=== Administration ===
In 1857, Boldmere was designated as an ecclesiastical parish, formed from the parish of St Michael's in Sutton Coldfield. When Sutton Coldfield was reorganised in 1885 (under the Municipal Corporations Act 1882), Boldmere was created as a ward, before being divided into Boldmere West and Boldmere East in 1935.

Boldmere is now part of the Royal Sutton Coldfield Town Council, which was formed following a consultative ballot in 2015. The role of this organisation is the same as a parish council. Boldmere is in the Sutton Vesey electoral ward.

== Geography ==
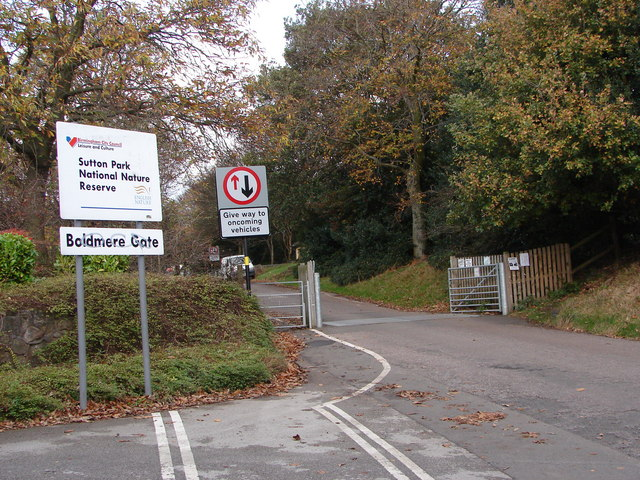
Boldmere Gate, providing access to Sutton Park on the north boundary of Boldmere

Boldmere is triangular in shape and roughly bounded on the north by Sutton Park, on the east by the Cross-City railway line and on the south-west by Chester Road. Boldmere Gate provides access to Sutton Park.

The main shopping centre of Boldmere is at the northern end of Boldmere Road, which runs north-south through the centre of Boldmere. The collection of shops at the southern end of Boldmere Road is known locally as Little Boldmere.

Gibbet Hill, in the north-west of the area, is named after the gibbet from which Edward Allport was hanged for the murder of London silk dyer John Johnson in the area on 28 March 1729. Although this site is no longer referred to as Gibbet Hill, and was undeveloped until (at least) 1906, the toponymy has survived in the name of Gibbet Hill Wood; an area which Birmingham City Council have identified as "an area of potential archaeological importance" due to "surviving archaeological remains".

== Economy ==
Boldmere is well-served with shops, hairdressers, pubs and restaurants. There are also a post office and a public library. All banks in Boldmere have now closed with the nearest branches being in Erdington or Sutton Town Centre.

=== Industry ===
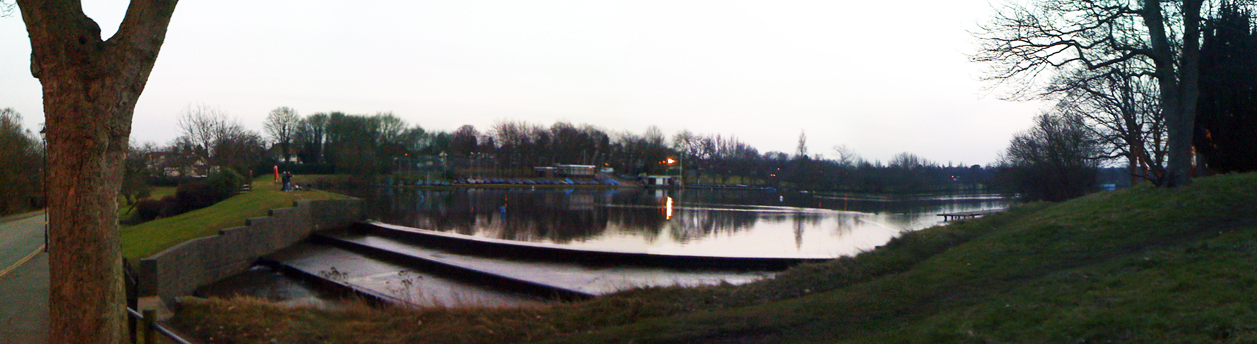
A view of the north-east end of Powells Pool – the slipway is visible in the foreground

In the 18th century, Powell's Pool (then known as New Forge Pool) near Boldmere Gate was the site of the mill used by John Wyatt to experiment with mechanised cotton spinning. Along with Lewis Paul, he developed the roller spinning machine and the flyer-and-bobbin system (Paul patented the former on 24 June 1738). In 1750, the mill was used by William Powell to manufacture spades (using locally-grown ash wood for the handles). It is believed that the first steel garden fork was manufactured at the mill. The building was later used to produce steel for the production of pen nibs. The Ordnance Survey's First Series map (1834) identifies a forge in this area, of which John Willets (a forgeman), John Page (a spade maker), and John Harris (a saw maker) have all been identified as proprietors.

The mill was demolished some time after 1936, after lying unused and dilapidated for a number of years. Although none of the building's structure remains, a waterfall (providing a spillway to Powell's Pool) is now sited where the millrace was located.

== Transport ==
Boldmere's main roads are Jockey Road (A453), Chester Road (A452) and Boldmere Road (B4142). Boldmere is served by Wylde Green and Chester Road railway stations, both on the Cross-City railway line, which runs between Lichfield Trent Valley and Redditch (via Birmingham New Street).

Boldmere is served by a number of National Express West Midlands bus services, including routes 5, 66, 77 and 907.

== Places of worship ==
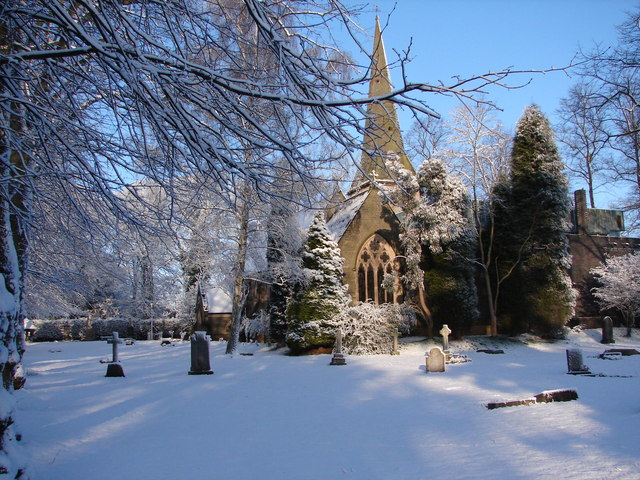
St Michael's Church

The churches in the area are St Michael's (Church of England), St Nicholas's (Roman Catholic), Chester Road Baptist Church, Boldmere Methodist Church, and Wylde Green United Reformed Church. St Nicholas's Church was preceded by a chapel that was designed by Augustus Welby Northmore Pugin and which opened in 1841. These churches take their name from Cardinal Nicholas Wiseman.

The ring of bells at St Michael's church are noted as being one of the few rings in Birmingham still in existence that were produced before the introduction of scientific bell tuning in the 1890s (John Taylor & Co installed Birmingham's first harmonic ring at St. Barnabas' Church, Erdington in 1906). The bells' 18th–19th century tonal quality is rare as most pre-scientific bells in Birmingham have been recast by the Taylor or Whitechapel foundries.

In 1964, St Michael's church was partially destroyed by fire, with only the tower and south aisle surviving. The building's reconstruction was not without controversy, particularly due to the unconventional use of Staffordshire blue brick.

== Education ==
Educational facilities in the area include Boldmere Infant and Nursery School, Boldmere Junior School, St Nicholas Catholic Primary School, and Boldmere Adult Education Centre.

In 1848, Reverend W. K. Riland Bedford worked towards opening Boldmere National School for Girls and Infants. The building served as Boldmere's Anglican church until the opening of St Michael's in 1857, and is now a health clinic.

== Leisure ==
=== Culture ===
Boldmere is home to Highbury Theatre Centre, a community theatre organisation. The theatre has been in its current location since it was built by its original members in 1942.

=== Sport ===
Boldmere Wanderers FC who were founded in 2018, play their home games at Rectory Park, Sutton Coldfield.

Boldmere Golf Course is located on the northern edge of Boldmere, and hosts Europe's longest-running pro-am golfing competition. The annual Great Midlands Fun Run uses Boldmere Gate as the entrance to Sutton Park.

Boldmere St. Michael's Football Club is a football club based in Boldmere, Sutton Coldfield, England. They are currently members of the Midland League Premier Division and play at the Trevor Brown Memorial Ground.

== Famous residents ==
Hazel Court, a British actress known for her appearances in horror films of the 1950s and 60s, lived in the area and attended Boldmere School and Highclare College.

Emma Willis, née Griffiths, who was born in 1976 lived on Boldmere Road during her childhood and attended Wylde Green Primary School.
