= Edward Johnstone (physician) =

English physician

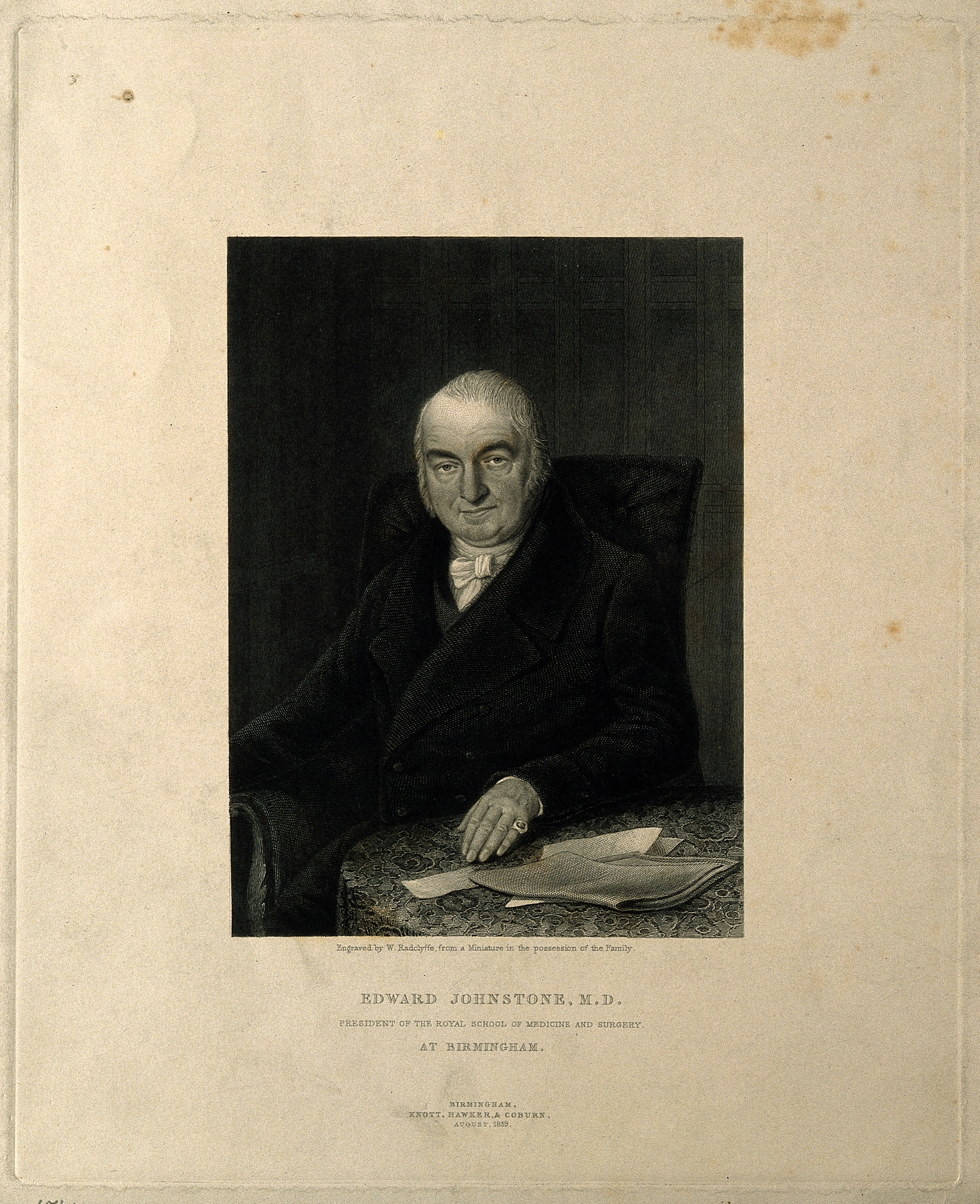
- Born: 26 September 1757
- Died: 4 September 1851 (aged 93)
- Occupation: Physician

Edward Johnstone (26 September 1757 – 4 September 1851) was an English physician.

== Biography ==
He was born at Kidderminster on 26 September 1757, the son of James Johnstone, M.D, and brother of John Johnstone (1768–1836). He was educated at the Kidderminster grammar school, and proceeded to the University of Edinburgh, where he graduated M.D. 14 June 1799. His inaugural thesis, De Febre Puerperali, was published, and was praised by the surgeon Claude Ponteau of Lyon.

In the autumn of 1799 Johnstone was elected one of the first physicians of the Birmingham General Hospital. He was a zealous supporter of the dispensary for supplying medical and surgical attendance to the sick poor at their own homes, as well as an active and munificent patron of every useful and charitable institution. When the plan for the medical school, afterwards Queen's College, was matured in 1827, he became president, and during a period of eighteen years was never absent from the meetings of the council. In 1836 the council deviated from its usual course by fixing its anniversary meeting on his eightieth birthday. He was the first principal of Queen's College. In 1844 the council and professors presented his portrait to the college, and on his retirement in 1845 he was warmly thanked for his services. In 1840 he helped to found the Queen's Hospital in Birmingham, and was honorary physician till his death.

Edward Johnstone died at Edgbaston Hall, near Birmingham, on 4 September 1851, and was buried in Edgbaston Old Church on 10 September.

== Family ==
Johnstone married Elizabeth, daughter of Thomas Pearson of Tettenhall, Staffordshire; she died in 1823.

The eldest son, Edward Johnstone, (1804–1881), claimant of the Marquess of Annandale peerage, born at Ladywood House, near Birmingham, 9 April 1804, was educated at Trinity College, Cambridge, where he graduated B.A. in 1825, and proceeded M.A. in 1828. He was called to the bar at Lincoln's Inn on 6 May 1828, and went the Oxford circuit. He migrated to the Inner Temple, where he was admitted a student on 24 April 1838, and called soon after. With the poet Campbell, Lord Dudley Stuart, Lord Ilchester, and others, he in 1832 founded the Literary Association of the Friends of Poland, and in 1836 published a pamphlet abridged and translated from ‘La Pologne et ses frontières,’ by the Marquis de Noailles, entitled ‘What is Poland? a question of Geography, History, and Public Law.’ He inherited the estates of Fulford Hall, Warwickshire, and Dunsley manor, Staffordshire. On 28 May 1876, in opposition to Sir Frederick Johnstone of Westerhall and Mr. John James Hope-Johnstone, he claimed in the House of Lords the dormant marquisate of Annandale, but the claims of all three petitioners were dismissed in 1881 on the ground of non-conclusive evidence. Johnstone died unmarried at Worcester on 20 Sept. 1881, and was buried in the family burial-place at Edgbaston. He was succeeded in his property by his nephew, Colonel Sir James Johnstone, K.C.S.I.

The second son, James Johnstone (1806–1869), physician, born at Edgbaston Hall, near Birmingham, on 12 April 1806, matriculated at Trinity College, Cambridge in 1819, graduated M.B. 1828, M.L. 1830, and M.D. 1833, and became a fellow of the Royal College of Physicians, London, in 1834. After studying in Edinburgh, Paris, and London, he settled in Birmingham, where he was appointed the first professor of materia medica and therapeutics at Queen's College in 1841, and extraordinary physician to the General Hospital, a post which he held for more than thirty years. On the visit of the British Medical Association to Birmingham in September 1865, Johnstone was chosen president. The best-known of his writings are ‘A Therapeutic Arrangement and Syllabus of Materia Medica,’ 1835, which had an extensive circulation; and ‘A Discourse on the Phenomena of Sensation as connected with the Mental, Physical, and Instructive Faculties of Man,’ 1841. He died at Leamington on 11 May 1869. He was the last of his family who distinguished himself in medicine in the midland counties, his grandfather, James, his father, Edward, and two uncles, John and James, having practised in Kidderminster, Worcester, and Birmingham. He married in 1834 Maria Mary Payne Webster, daughter of Joseph Webster of Penns Hall, Warwickshire, and by her, who died in 1859, left 12 children. His eldest son was Colonel Sir James Johnstone, K.C.S.I.; his third son Charles Johnstone, R.N.; and his third daughter Catherine Laura Johnstone, a writer.
