= Edward Hooson =

English chartist and co-operator (1825–1869)

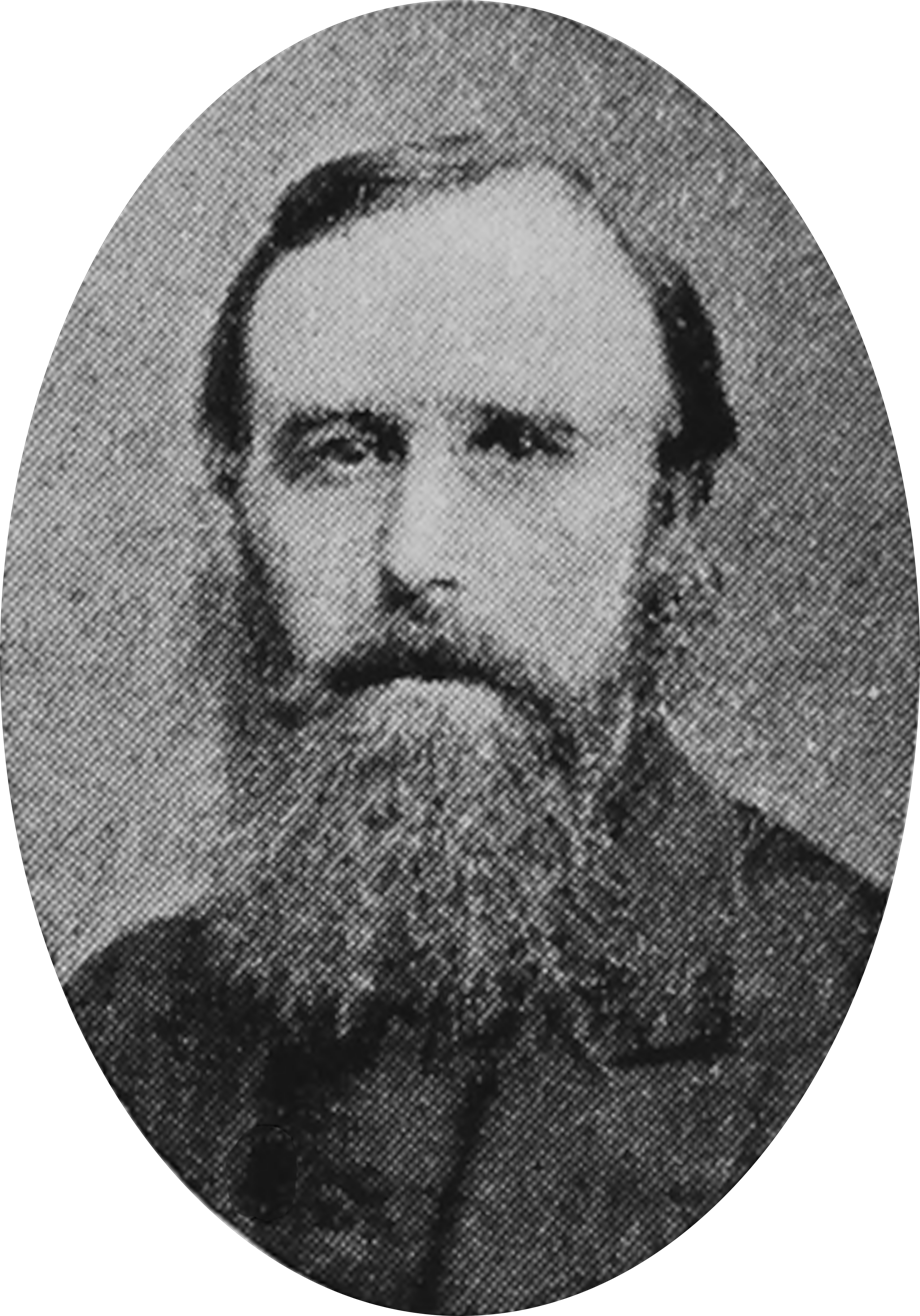
- Born: 16 April 1825; Nr. Halifax, Yorkshire, England
- Died: 11 December 1869 (aged 44)
- Occupations: Wire drawer; Campaigner
- Movement: Chartism; Co-operative

Edward Hooson (16 April 1825 – 11 December 1869) was an English Chartist, co-operator, and a wire drawer by trade.

== Biography ==
Hooson was born near Halifax, Yorkshire, and had a limited education. He apprenticed as a wire drawer before moving to Manchester, where he became active in the chartist movement. He became close friends with the chartist poet Ernest Jones. He was a co-founder of the Union and Emancipation Society based in Manchester, an influential abolitionist campaign supporting the Union in the American Civil War. In the 1860s he was chairman of the Manchester branch of the Reform League.

He was a founding member of the North of England Co-operative Wholesale Society (later the CWS) and served on the committee from 1866 until his death.

Hooson died aged 44 on 11 December 1869 and was buried in Ardwick Cemetery in Manchester.
