= Hay Mills =

Area of Birmingham, England

Coordinates: 52.466°N 1.816°W

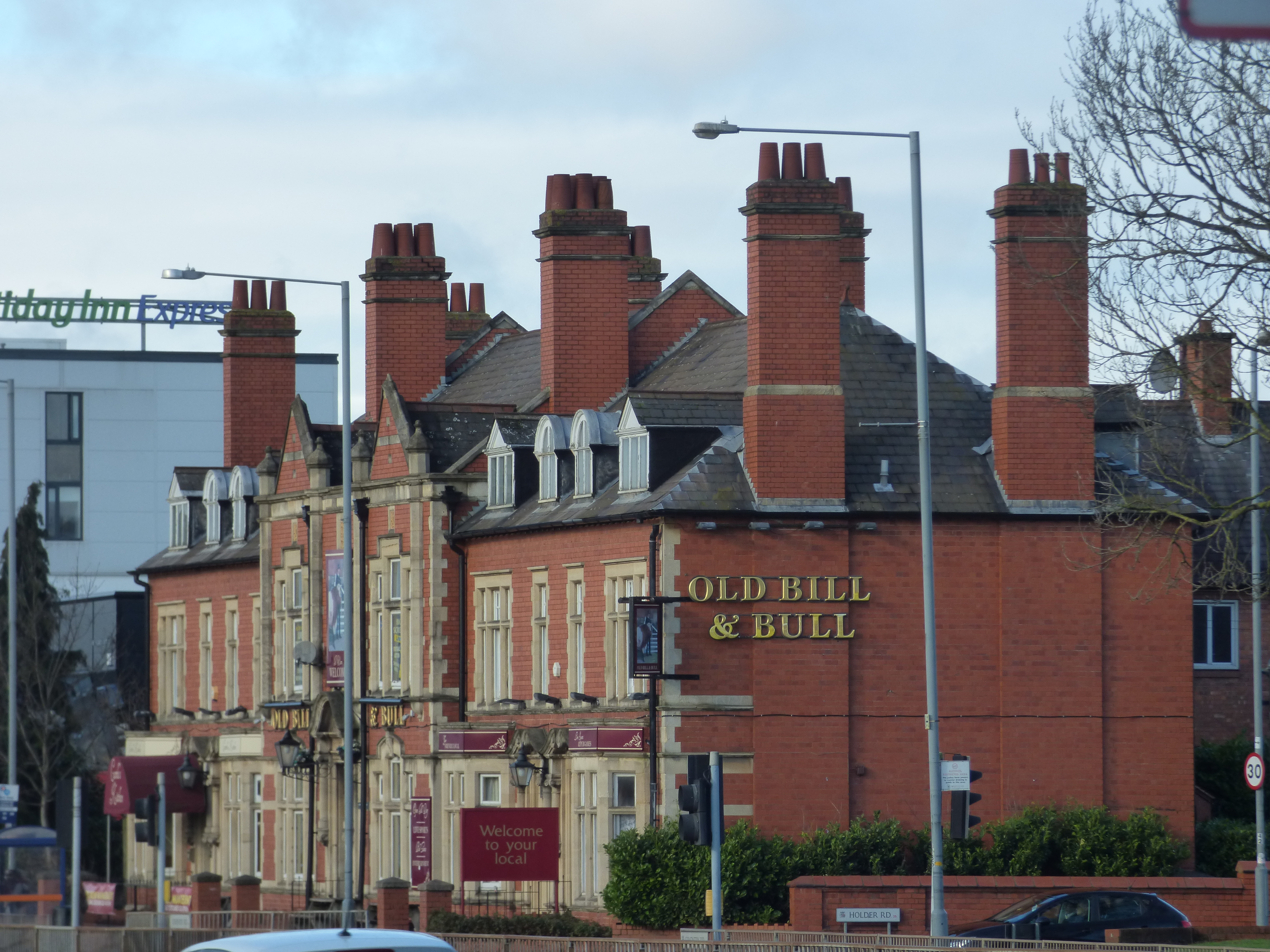
- The Old Bill & Bull pub, Hay Mills

- Location within the West Midlands
- OS grid reference: SP115848
- Metropolitan borough: Birmingham
- Metropolitan county: West Midlands
- Region: West Midlands
- Country: England
- Sovereign state: United Kingdom
- Post town: BIRMINGHAM
- Postcode district: B10/B25
- Dialling code: 0121
- Police: West Midlands
- Fire: West Midlands
- Ambulance: West Midlands
- UK Parliament: Birmingham Yardley

Hay Mills is an area of east Birmingham, England straddling the A45 Coventry Road about 3 miles (5 km) south east of the city centre. North of the Coventry Road is mainly residential whereas the south is mixed residential and commercial. The area was subsumed into Birmingham in 1911.

== History ==
Haye is the first recorded name dating to 1171 and Hayemill by 1495. In Old English, gehaeg means 'fenced/ hedged land'. Here would have been the farm of a medieval family who had enclosed some of the fertile land near the River Cole. The enclosed fields may have been surrounded by a substantial ditch perhaps as wide as two metres and over a metre in depth. There was a corresponding bank of similar dimensions. It is likely that the bank would have been topped with a fence while a live hedge grew. The hedge would have been planted with hawthorn, a quick growing tree whose name literally means 'hedge thorn'. It is likely that the enclosures would have been used for keeping livestock, probably cattle, close to the lush watermeadows along the river. Hugh de la Haye, his family name taken from the placename, is recorded in 1171.

The district takes its full name from Hay Mill which stood on the River Cole near James Road/ Mill Road. The mill belonged to the occupants of Hay Hall and ground corn from at least 1495. Converted to blade grinding probably during the Civil War, this trade continued until about 1830 when James Horsfall, a wire drawer of Digbeth moved here. There was no settlement at Hay Mills in 1834, but by 1888 the south side of the Coventry Road was being built up from Heybarnes Road to Forest Road. Horsfall had the old buildings demolished and rebuilt some 100m north of the old site. A larger mill with a larger pool was built for wire drawing. Other industries included iron founding, brick manufacture, cabinet manufacture, electrical switch making and the embryonic British motorcycle industry in Kings Road. By 1906 there was considerable urbanisation, although Hay Mills was still separated from Small Heath by the undeveloped Cole valley and in the parish of Yardley, Worcestershire, until becoming part of Birmingham in 1911.

== Geography ==
Hay Mills is the area on and immediately either side of the A45 Coventry Road once the River Cole has been crossed heading east out of Birmingham until the junction with the A4040 at Yardley Road. Hobmoor Road provides a northern boundary whilst the Birmingham and Warwick Junction Branch of the Grand Union Canal, running behind Ammington and Speedwell Roads, provides a boundary to the south.

== Industry ==
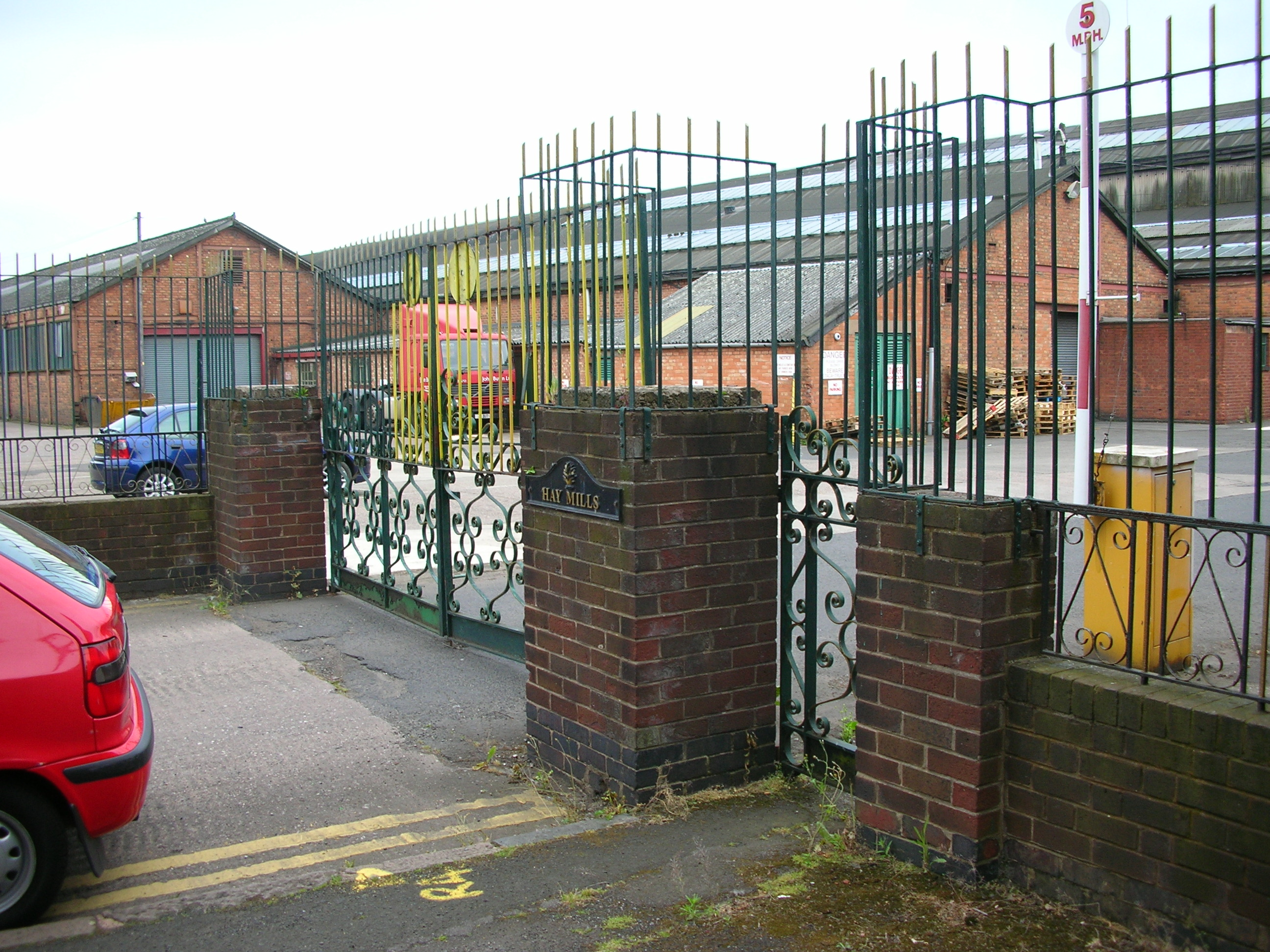
Hay Mills wire factory, Birmingham, maker of wire for the first transatlantic telegraph cable

Webster Horsfall

James Horsfall, a wire drawer from Digbeth invented high tensile steel wire. He moved to Hay Mill, a disused blade and sword factory at a water mill on the River Cole, rebuilding it as a steam-driven mill. The mill originally belonged to Hay Hall in Tyseley. In 1855, his company merged with that of Joseph Webster of Penn Mill, Sutton Coldfield. Webster was a major manufacturer and exporter of piano wire to Europe.

In 1853, Horsfall had patented a heat treatment process which strengthened the wire. This led to improved piano wire (giving a near monopoly), wire for making needles in Redditch, fishhooks, and umbrella frames. The firm made the armoured wire for first successful transatlantic telegraph cable in 1866, using 30,000 miles of wire (1,600 tons), made by 250 workers over 11 months. The strengthened wire also made possible the construction of aeroplanes and automobiles. The company today also makes springs.

Latch and Batchelor

Founded by Arthur Latch, Telford Clarence Batchelor and Henry Herbert Horsfall to develop Batchelor's patent of Locked Coil Wire Rope and Flattened Strand, it was formed in 1884 on part of the Hay Mills site owned at that time by Webster and Horsfall Ltd. Due to its smooth outer layer Locked Coil became increasing popular with its use in aerial ropeways and its unexpected yet excellent non-spinning properties and high breaking-strength-to-weight ratio were recognised by the mining industry and adopted worldwide. Locked Coil development continued with the advent of the half-lock Colliery Guide ropes and more use being made of galvanised wires. The company was one of the first to come under direct Government control in both World Wars. In the 1914–18 war they were the sole manufacturer of shell fuse spring wire, for example, producing 80,260 miles, along with anti-submarine netting, mine, aircraft and balloon cables.

The works did not fare so well in the 1939–45 conflict, receiving several direct hits during air raids. The main crane in the rope mill still shudders halfway down the shop caused by slight track misalignment from this time. The virtual extinction of Britain's core manufacturing industries and mining caused a re-focus our the entire manufacturing operation at Hay Mills in the 1980s, and as a result the company now concentrates on manufacturing a variety of specialist mining ropes for the export market as well as stocking, servicing and trading a wide range of high-quality ropes and attachments for numerous applications.

== Governance ==
Nationally, Hay Mills is part of the Birmingham, Yardley constituency (Note: A borough constituency (for the purposes of election expenses and type of returning officer)) represented in the House of Commons of the UK Parliament since 2015 by Jess Phillips of the Labour Party. (Note: As with all constituencies, the constituency elects one Member of Parliament (MP) by the first past the post system of election at least every five years.)

Hay Mills is represented on Birmingham City Council by a Green Party councillor: Atikur Rahman.

Hay Mills was included in the West Midlands electoral region of the European Parliament.

== Transport ==
The Grand Union Canal and the Leamington Spa to Birmingham railway line pass through the district. Tyseley and Small Heath are the closest railway stations situated approximately a 1 mile (1.6 km) from Hay Mills and served by West Midlands Trains to Birmingham, Dorridge and Leamington Spa and Chiltern Railways to Warwick, High Wycombe and London Marylebone.

Motorway access is via junction 6 of the M42 beyond Birmingham Airport 5.4 miles (8.7 km) away with links to the M5, M6 and M40 motorways.

The nearest airport is Birmingham Airport situated 5.4 miles (8.7 km) to the East. A smaller aerodrome, Hay Mills Rotor Station, offering helicopter flights to London, operated from June 1951 to April 1952.

== Education ==
- Redhill Junior and Infant School

== Religious sites ==
St Cyprians Church is situated in the Fordrough.

== Notable buildings ==
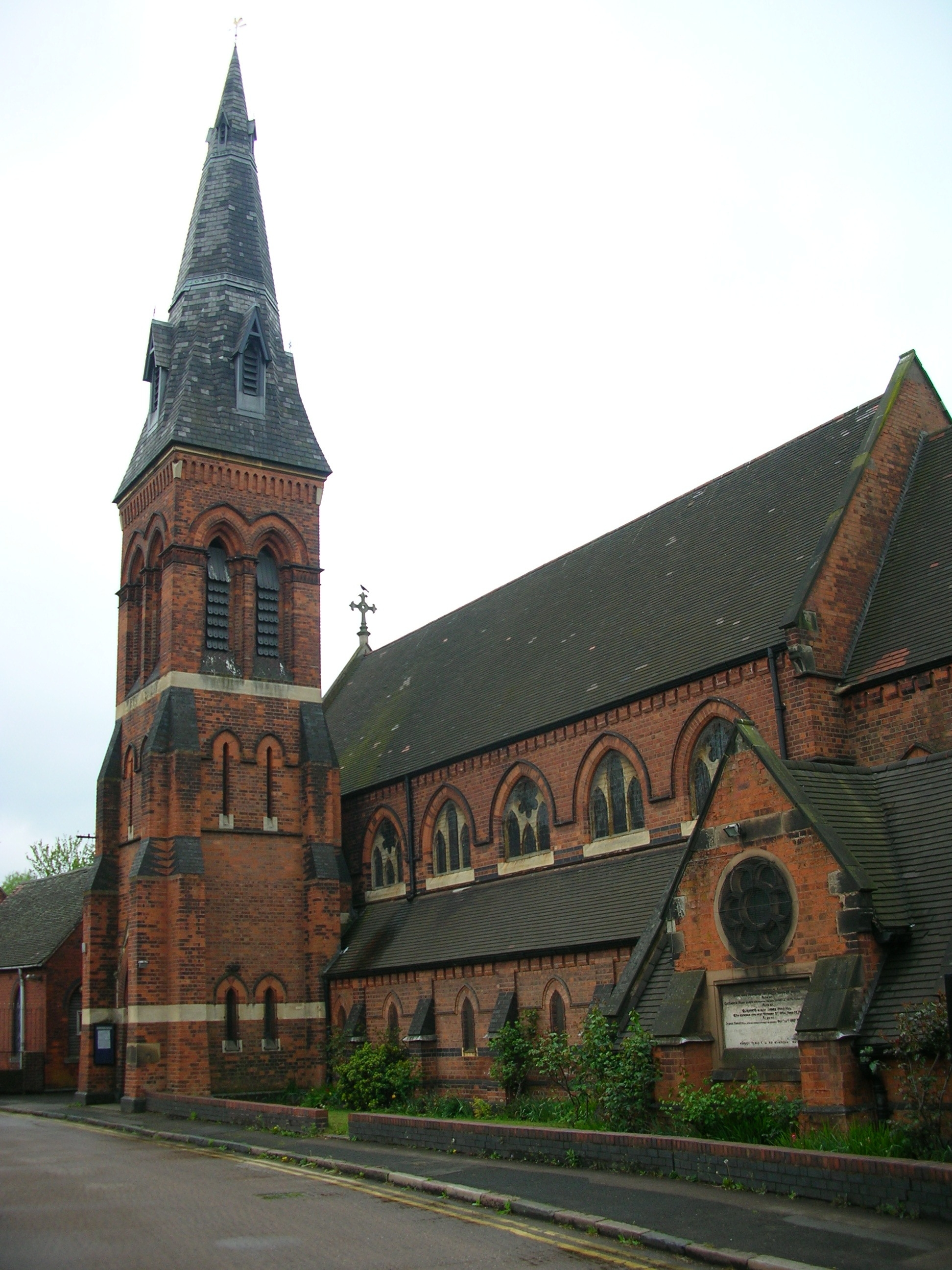
St Cyprian's church at Hay Mills factory

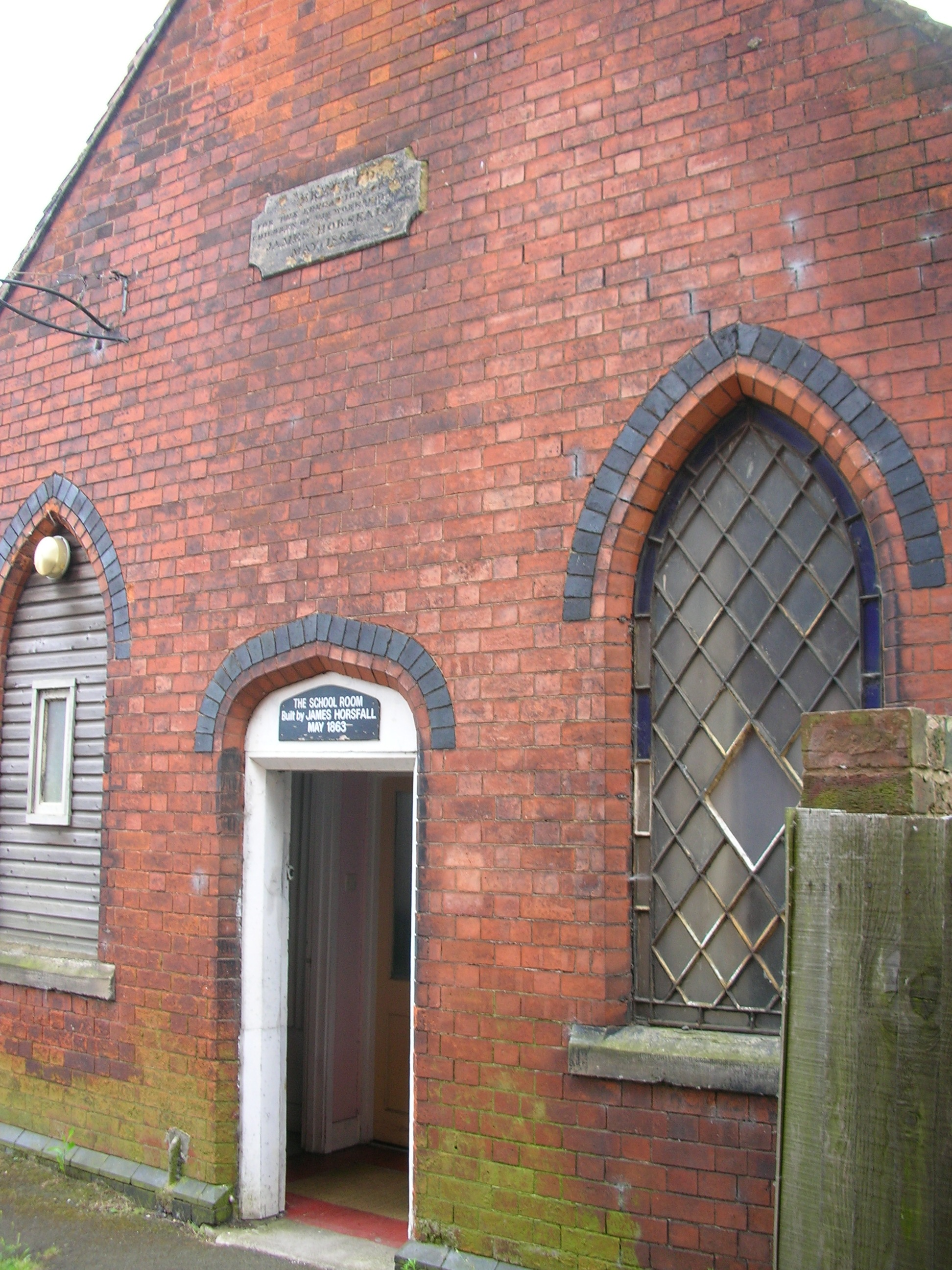
School house at Hay Mills factory

Horsfall built houses and, in 1863, a school for his workers' children. In 1873, he built a church, St Cyprian's, designed by Frank Barlow Osborn and now grade II listed, over the mill race on the mill site. This developed into the village of Hay Mills.

== Notable people ==
- Kevin McNally, actor
- Fred Starkey, amateur athlete and model for a sculpture of the Greek god Apollo by William Bloye, which stands in Coronation Gardens, Dudley.

== See also ==
- Penns Hall, original mill of Joseph Webster
- St Cyprian's Church, Hay Mills

== Notes and references ==
Notes

References

- John Philip Lethbridge (1 January 2002). Victorian Birmingham. ISBN 978-0-9512227-8-2.
- Christopher Upton (30 September 1993). A history of Birmingham. Phillimore & Company. ISBN 0-85033-870-0.
- John Horsfall (December 1971). The Ironmasters of Penns. The Roundwood Press. ISBN 978-0-900093296.
- Webster and Horsfall
- BBC article on the mill and the transatlantic cable
- National Archives – Short history
- "Origins of Hay Mill and Hay Hall". Archived from the original on 4 June 2011 – via Questia.
