= Baron Dickinson Webster =

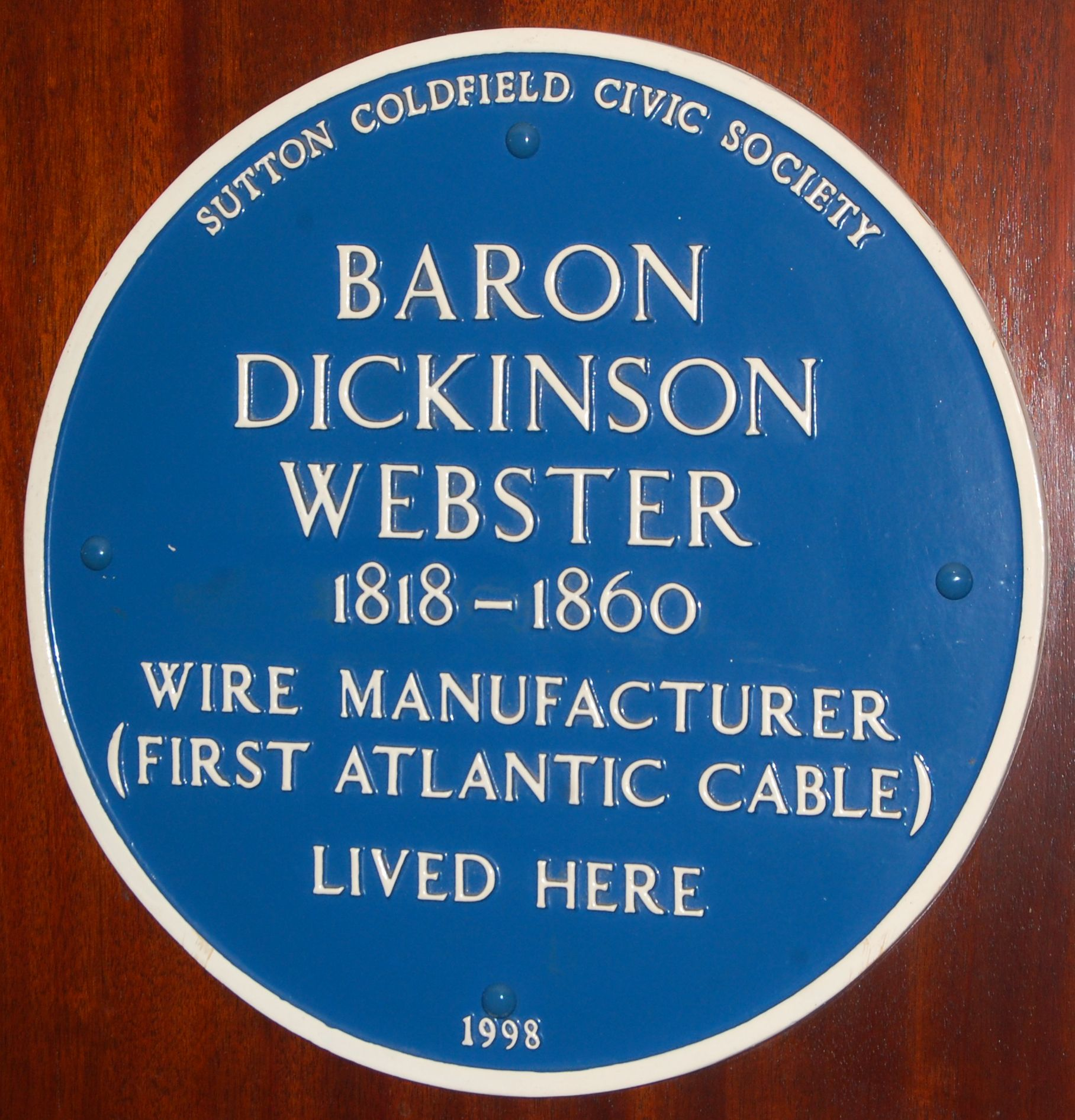
- Blue plaque at Penns Hall
- Born: 1818
- Died: 1860
- Known for: Wire manufacture

Baron Dickinson Webster (1818–1860), son of Joseph Webster of Penns Hall, Sutton Coldfield (then in Warwickshire), England, was a Justice of the Peace, a freemason, a member of the Aston Union and of the Turnpike Trust and was Warden of the town in 1844 and in 1855-1858 ("Baron" was his given name, not a heraldic title).

A man of some prominence, he was much involved in the negotiations with railway companies regarding their plans for routes to and through Sutton Coldfield. His business interests included the manufacture of wire, and in 1998 a blue plaque was erected at Penns Hall, by the Sutton Coldfield Civic Society, honouring his involvement in the first transatlantic telegraph cable.

In 1855, the business of Websters was merged with that of Horsfall at Hay Mills, Birmingham, and, in 1859, the whole business was transferred to Hay Mills and the Penns Mills were closed down, with serious financial consequences for many workers and the economy of the Walmley area of Sutton Coldfield.

== Family ==
He was the son of Joseph Webster (1783–1856) and Maria Mary née Payne (1792–1848), daughter of Peter Payne (1762–1843) of St Kitts. His sister was the writer, Janet Millett.

He married twice:

- in 1846 to Anne Maria Pipe-Wolferstan (1820-1848) by whom he had two sons who both died young: Baron Webster (1845-1845), Charles Payne Webster (1846-1862) and a daughter Frances Sharpe Webster (1848-1932) who married Stanley Edward Hicks JP DL Barrister at Law; and
- secondly, in 1850, to Anna Maria Bristowe (1826-1862) daughter of Samuel Ellis Bristowe (1800-1855) JP DL and Mary Anne née Fox and brother of Samuel Boteler Bristowe (1822-1897) QC. They had two sons: Baron Dickinson Webster (1850-1930) who married Ellen Elizabeth Fox (1852-1923), a daughter of William Darwin Fox; and Lt Col Godfrey Fox Webster (1852-1933).
