= Great Midlands Fun Run =

The Great Midlands Fun Run is an annual charity fundraising event held in Sutton Coldfield, Birmingham, West Midlands, England.

The event began in 2003, as the successor to the Royal Sutton Fun Run with a total of 2,800 entrants raising just over £40,000. This was doubled in 2004 to £82,700 and a further £81,800 was added in 2005 before rising £108,300 in the 2006 event. In 2015, 203 charities and voluntary organisations nominated by the participants received a record-breaking £347,000 from the event. Over £2,540,000 has been distributed to charities and voluntary organisations since 2003.

It is sponsored by numerous local companies including Erdington based Cookes Furniture, Central Independent Newspapers Ltd who publish the Sutton Coldfield Observer, Tamworth Herald, Lichfield Mercury, and Walsall Advertiser, Chambers Group (Ford automotive dealership in Sutton Coldfield and a Mazda/Hyundai dealership in Tamworth) and Sutton based Square Circle – web and social media partner. The specially minted medal, presented to all who complete the course, is sponsored by Cookes Furniture.

The route is 8½ miles long and completely tarmacked. It begins in Sutton Coldfield town centre before entering Sutton Park at Boldmere Gate and running for 4½ miles before leaving the park at Four Oaks Gate. Participants then return to Sutton Coldfield town centre to finish on The Parade.
