= Wylde Green railway station =

Railway station in Birmingham, England

Wylde Green
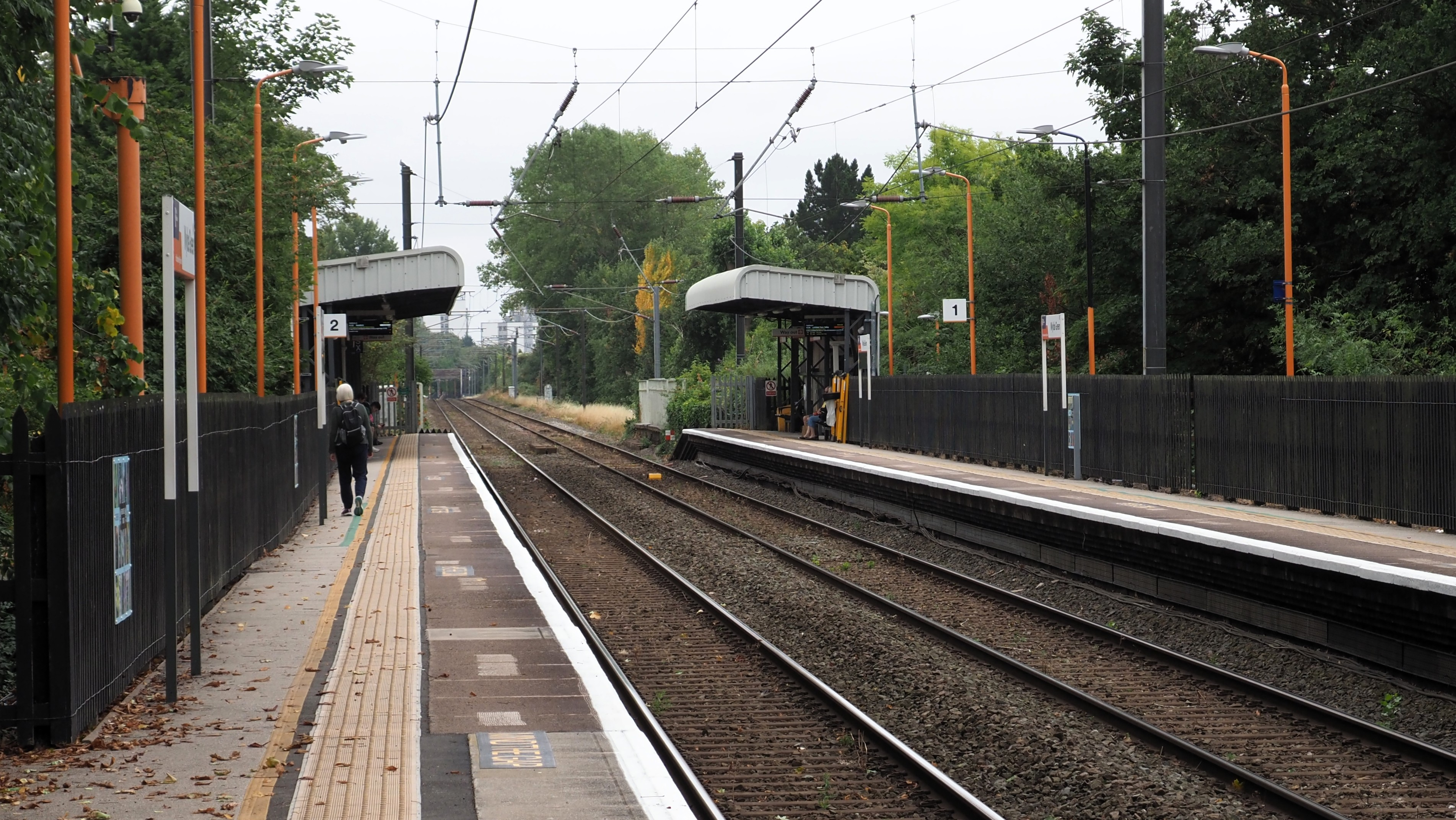
- Wylde Green station in 2025

General information
- Location: Wylde Green, Birmingham; England
- Coordinates: 52.546°N 1.831°W
- Grid reference: SP114942
- Manager: West Midlands Railway
- Transit authority: Transport for West Midlands
- Platforms: 2

Other information
- Station code: WYL
- Fare zone: 4
- Classification: DfT category E

Key dates
- 2 June 1862: Opened

Passengers
- 2021/22: ▲0.302 million
- 2022/23: ▲0.389 million
- 2023/24: ▲0.474 million
- 2024/25: ▲0.521 million
- 2025/26: ▲0.597 million
Location
Notes
- Passenger statistics from the Office of Rail and Road

Wylde Green railway station is a railway station serving northern Wylde Green and Boldmere in Sutton Coldfield, Birmingham, West Midlands, England. It is on the Redditch/Bromsgrove-Birmingham New Street-Lichfield Cross-City Line 6 1/2 miles (10.5 km) north east of Birmingham New Street, and is in TfWM fare zone 4.

Pedestrian and vehicular access is via Station Road, with pedestrian access also available from Highbridge Road. The platforms are above the former road, but below the latter.

Despite the station name, Chester Road railway station is located closer to Wylde Green's shopping centre, The Lanes.

== History ==
The station was opened on 2 June 1862, when the LNWR Birmingham to Sutton Coldfield railway line was completed and later operated by the LMS.

== Facilities ==
The station has a car park.

There is a ticket office situated before the platform 2 entrance, with a ticket vending machine located next to it.

There are shelters at the end of each platform, with seated areas located there.

=== Access for disabled passenegers ===
There are ramps accessing both platforms at Erdington Station. Wylde Green has been classified as a step-free access category B1 station. This means that there is step-free access to all platforms, but that this may include long or steep ramps, as is the case here.

== Services ==
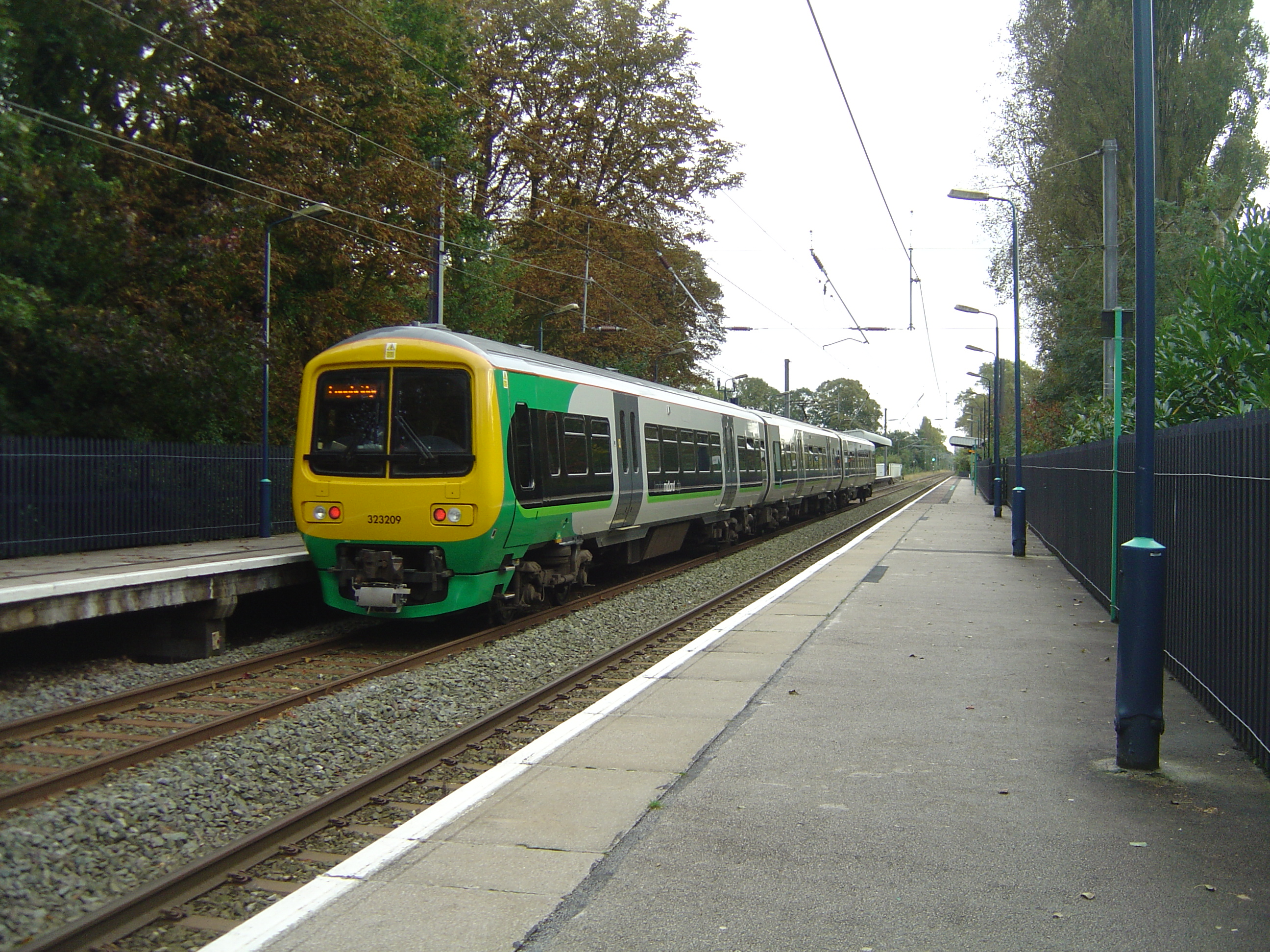
A London Midland Class 323 with a service to Longbridge at the station in 2008

The station is served by West Midlands Trains with local Transport for West Midlands branded "Cross-City" services, operated using Class 730 Electric multiple units (EMUs).

The off-peak service pattern is as follows:

Mondays to Saturdays:

- 4tph northbound to Four Oaks via Sutton Coldfield, departing from Platform 1.
  - Of which:
    - 2tph continue to Lichfield Trent Valley via Lichfield City.
- 4tph southbound to Longbridge via Birmingham New Street and University, departing from Platform 2.
  - Of which:
    - 2tph continue to Redditch via Alvechurch, calling at all stations.
    - 2tph continue to Bromsgrove calling at all stations except Duddeston, 1tph does not call at Barnt Green.

Sundays:

- 2tph northbound to Lichfield Trent Valley.
- 2tph southbound to Redditch.

Services on Sundays call at all stations between Lichfield T.V. and Redditch.

The average journey time to Birmingham New Street is around 18 minutes.

Preceding station	National Rail	Following station
Sutton Coldfield	West Midlands Railway; Lichfield – Four Oaks – Birmingham – Bromsgrove/Redditch; Cross-City Line	Chester Road
