= John Johnstone (physician) =

British physician and biographer

John Johnstone (1768–1836) was a British physician and biographer.

== Life ==
John Johnstone was born to James Johnstone MD and his wife Hannah Crane. Among his brothers were Edward Johnstone and James Johnstone (1753–1783).

John was born in Kidderminster, where his father was practising. He studied at Kidderminster Free School and entered Merton College, Oxford, in 1786. He graduated with BA in 1789, MA in 1792, MB in 1793, and MD in 1800.

Johnstone became a fellow of the Royal College of Physicians of London in 1805, and a fellow of the Royal Society in 1815. He delivered the Harveian Oration in 1819. He practised medicine in Worcester from 1793 to 1799, when he moved to Birmingham, where he built up a large practice. From 1801 to 1833 he was physician to Birmingham General Hospital. He was president of the second meeting of the Provincial Medical and Surgical Association in 1834.

Johnstone died in Birmingham on 28 December 1836, aged 68.

== Works ==
A close friend of Samuel Parr, Johnstone wrote his not uncritical Memoirs (1828) for the edition of Parr's works in eight volumes; Parr had assisted him in his Harveian Oration (1819) and in his Reply to Mr. Carmichael Smyth (1805). He also published:

- "An Essay on Mineral Poisons", in Medical Essays and Observations, by James Johnstone, senior, his father, Evesham, 1795.
- On Madness, with Strictures on Hereditary Insanity, Lucid Intervals, and the Confinement of Maniacs, Birmingham, 1800.
- An Account of the Discovery of the Power of Mineral Acid Vapours to Destroy Contagion, London, 1803; this provoked James Carmichael Smyth's Letter to William Wilberforce of 1805. Smyth's claim to priority with a method of prevention of contagion, based on oxides of nitrogen, was upheld by Parliament. It had been contested by Johnstone, on behalf of his father James, and Jean-Antoine Chaptal, on behalf of Louis-Bernard Guyton de Morveau.
- A Reply to Dr. James Carmichael Smyth, containing remarks on his "Letter to Mr. Wilberforce", London, 1805.
- Presidential Address at the Second Anniversary of the Provincial Medical and Surgical Association at Birmingham, 1834.
- Address at the Birmingham School of Medicine on 6 Oct. 1834. These two last were published with the Harveian Oration.

== Family ==
Johnstone married Anna Delicia Curtis, daughter of Captain George Curtis, and niece of Sir William Curtis, 1st Baronet, on 26 December 1809. They had two daughters, Anna Delicia (born 1811), who married Walter Farquhar Hook, and Agnes Mary (born 1814), who married the Rev. Henry Clarke, son of Sir William Clarke, 1st Baronet (1762–1808).
