= Hay Hall, Birmingham =

Historic building in Birmingham, England

Hay Hall
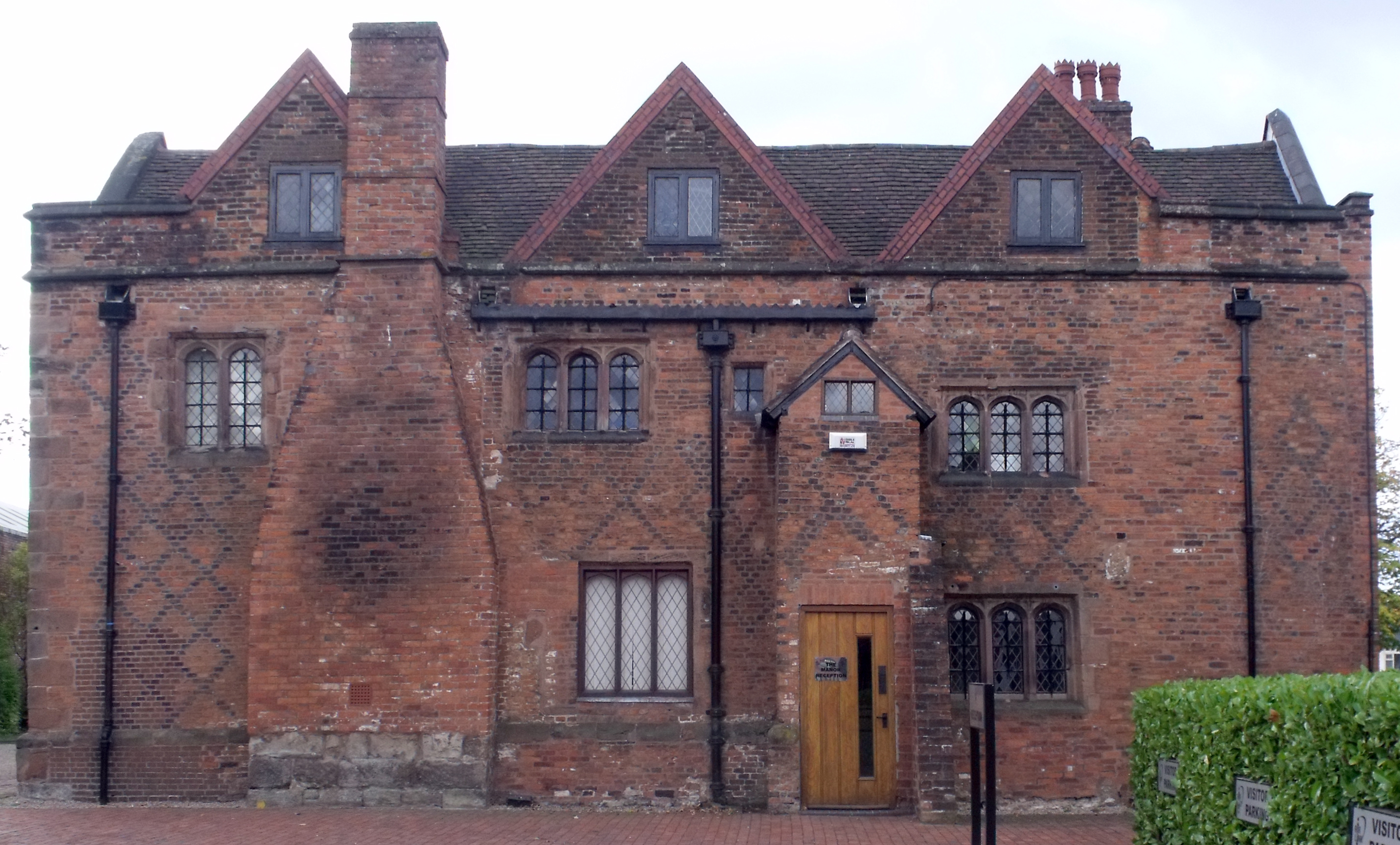
- Interactive map of the Hay Hall area
- Former names: Haye Hall

General information
- Type: Brick
- Location: Redfern Road, Hay Mills, Birmingham, England
- Coordinates: 52.4580°N 1.8408°W
- Completed: 1423
- Renovated: 1810, 1948
- Owner: Reynolds Tube Company Limited

Hay Hall is a former 15th century hall located at Tyseley, in Birmingham, West Midlands, England. The extensive Hay Hall estate was situated between the Coventry and Warwick roads and included an area now known as Hay Mills, which was the site of a water mill. In the 16th century the timber-framed building was encased in brick. Originally a sub manor of the Este family, the building form comprised a central open hall with cross-wings at either end. There are no traces of the original moat in the area, with the modern surroundings currently developed as factories and works, known as Hay Hall Business Park. It was listed as Grade II in 1952.

== History ==
A moated house or manor was first founded at the site in about 1275 by the De La Haye family and rebuilt in 1430. Hay Hall passed on to the Este family in 1423, when the heiress Marian De La Haye married Thomas Este. They are commemorated in St. Edburgha's Church at Yardley by a wall sculpture depicting them. The Este family owned and occupied Hay Hall until the late seventeenth century, after which the property changed hands frequently and much of the land was sold to canal and railway companies. In 1917 the Patented Butted Tube Company purchased Hay Hall and the remaining 12 acres of land. The estate was developed into new tube works and factories but Hay Hall was saved from demolition.

The last person to actually reside at Hay Hall was apparently a Mrs Shelley who was employed as a housekeeper by the then rebranded Tube Investments Company, and was known to be living in the Hall up until 1939. In 1948 the building was fully restored and was in use as private offices for the Reynolds Tube Company Limited until 2007, when they moved to nearby Shaftmoor Lane.

== Description ==
The central part of the house features an arch-braced collar-beam roof truss, typical of an open hall of the 14th or 15th century. Notable external features include exposed timber-framing on the south-eastern end wall, and a two-storied timbered porch containing a pointed arch. On the northeastern side of the building a solar wing was either originally encased in diaper-patterned brickwork, or the wing was a later addition in the 16th century. Its structure is formed in three bays divided by open roof trusses, and which were later enclosed in a dormered attic. It also features stone-mullioned windows. Inside the building Tudor wall painting and a fragment of stained glass have survived. In 1790 it was partly altered with the addition of a new five-gabled front to the southwestern side. A roof fire in 1810 has left no obvious signs of fire damage to the original timbers. The building was further refurbished and altered in 1948.
