= James Johnstone (physician) =

Scottish physician

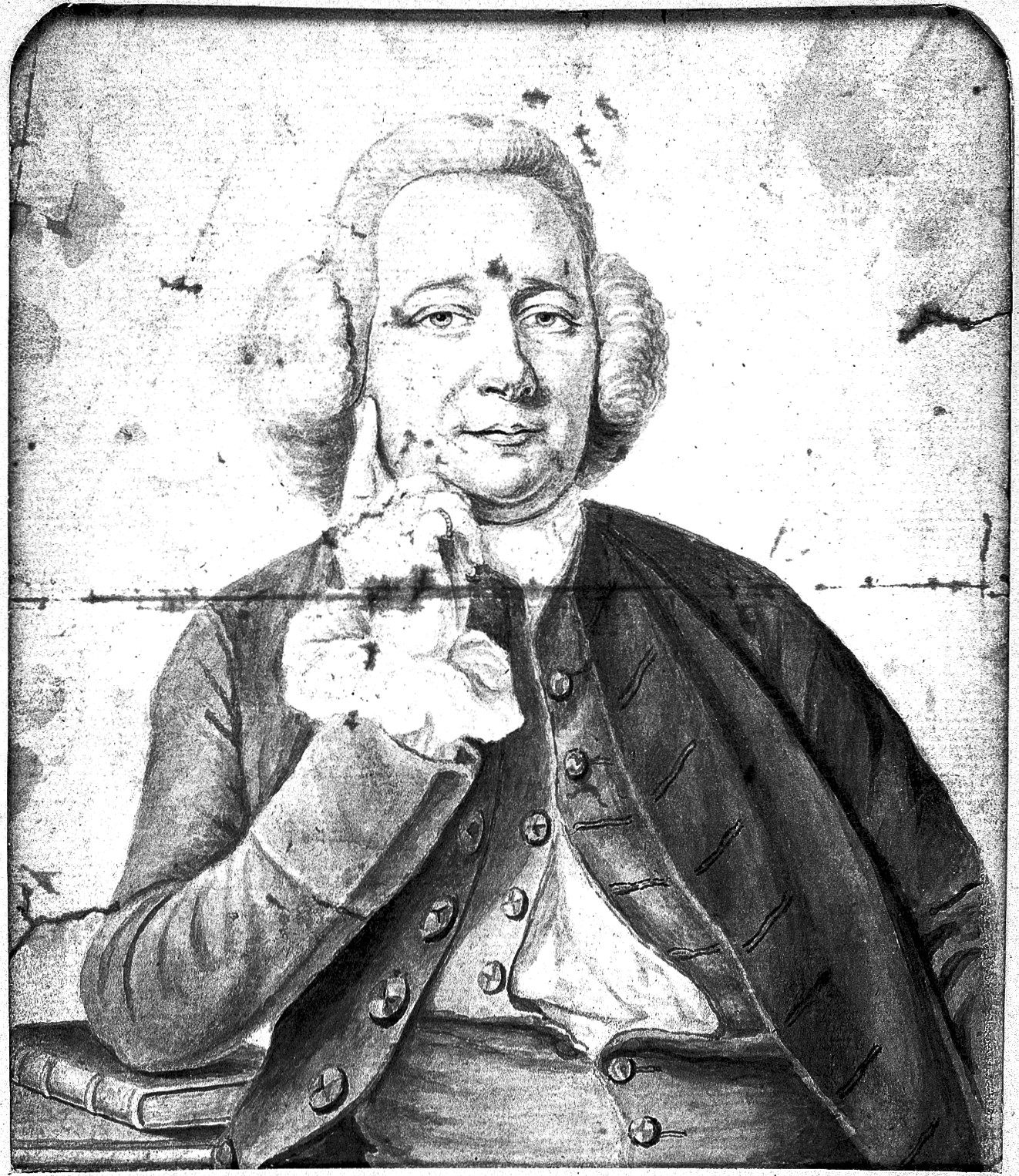
- Born: 1730? Annan, Dumfriesshire
- Died: 28 April 1802
- Occupation: Physician

James Johnstone (1730? – 28 April 1802) was a Scottish physician.

== Biography ==
Johnstone was born about 1730 at Annan, Dumfriesshire, and studied medicine at Edinburgh, chiefly under Robert Whytt, graduating M.D. in 1750. After a visit to Paris he settled at Kidderminster in 1751, and continued there until 1783, when he removed to Worcester, shortly after the death of his son James (see below). He was a good scholar and antiquary, a friend of Bishop Hurd and of George, lord Lyttelton, of whose deathbed he gave ‘a very affecting and instructive account’ (Johnson, Lives of the Poets). He practised as a physician in Worcester almost to the day of his death, 28 April 1802. His epitaph in the cathedral was composed by Dr. Parr. He married Hannah, daughter of Henry Crane of Kidderminster. Of his five sons, three, James the younger, Edward, and John, also of Birmingham, became physicians.

Johnstone's first work was on ‘The Malignant Epidemical Fever of 1756,’ London, 1758, with other observations from his Kidderminster practice since 1752. It is interesting for its account of instances of putrid or malignant sore throat among the cases of typhus, a phenomenon which had been first described in a famous essay by Fothergill for London in 1748, and after him by Le Cat for Rouen previous to 1755, and by Huxham for Plymouth in 1757. The same subject was afterwards treated by Johnstone's son James. The other point of interest in the essay of 1758 was the casual notice, among other disinfectants for typhus, of the ‘thick white steam’ of muriatic acid set free by pouring small quantities of vitriol from time to time upon common salt heated in a chafing-dish of coals. The same disinfectant having been formally advocated in 1802 before a committee of the House of Commons, of which Wilberforce was chairman, a question of priority arose between Dr. John Johnstone, on behalf of his late father, and Dr. Carmichael Smyth, each of whom wrote a pamphlet (1803 and 1805) preferring his respective claim. Besides writing on fevers, Johnstone wrote, with sound knowledge of the physiology of muscle and nerve (as taught by Whytt), upon ‘The Use of the Ganglions of the Nerves’ (Shrewsbury, 1771, German translation by C. F. Michaelis, Stettin, 1787), his theory having been originally communicated to the Royal Society in two papers (Phil. Trans. liv. 177, lvii. 118). The theory was that the ganglia of the sympathetic nerve ‘rendered the movements of the heart and intestine uniformly involuntary,’ a fact which he considered to be inexplicable by any peculiarity of their muscular structure. Another medical piece was on the medicinal water of Walton, near Tewkesbury, and its curative power in scrofula, with some remarks on the uses of the lymphatic glands (two editions, 1787 and 1790). In 1789 he published ‘A Second Dialogue of the Dead, between Fernan Cortez and William Penn, to which is added a Scheme for the Abolition of Slavery.’ In 1795 he issued ‘Medical Essays and Observations, with Disquisitions on the Nervous System, and Essay on Mineral Poisons’ (Evesham).

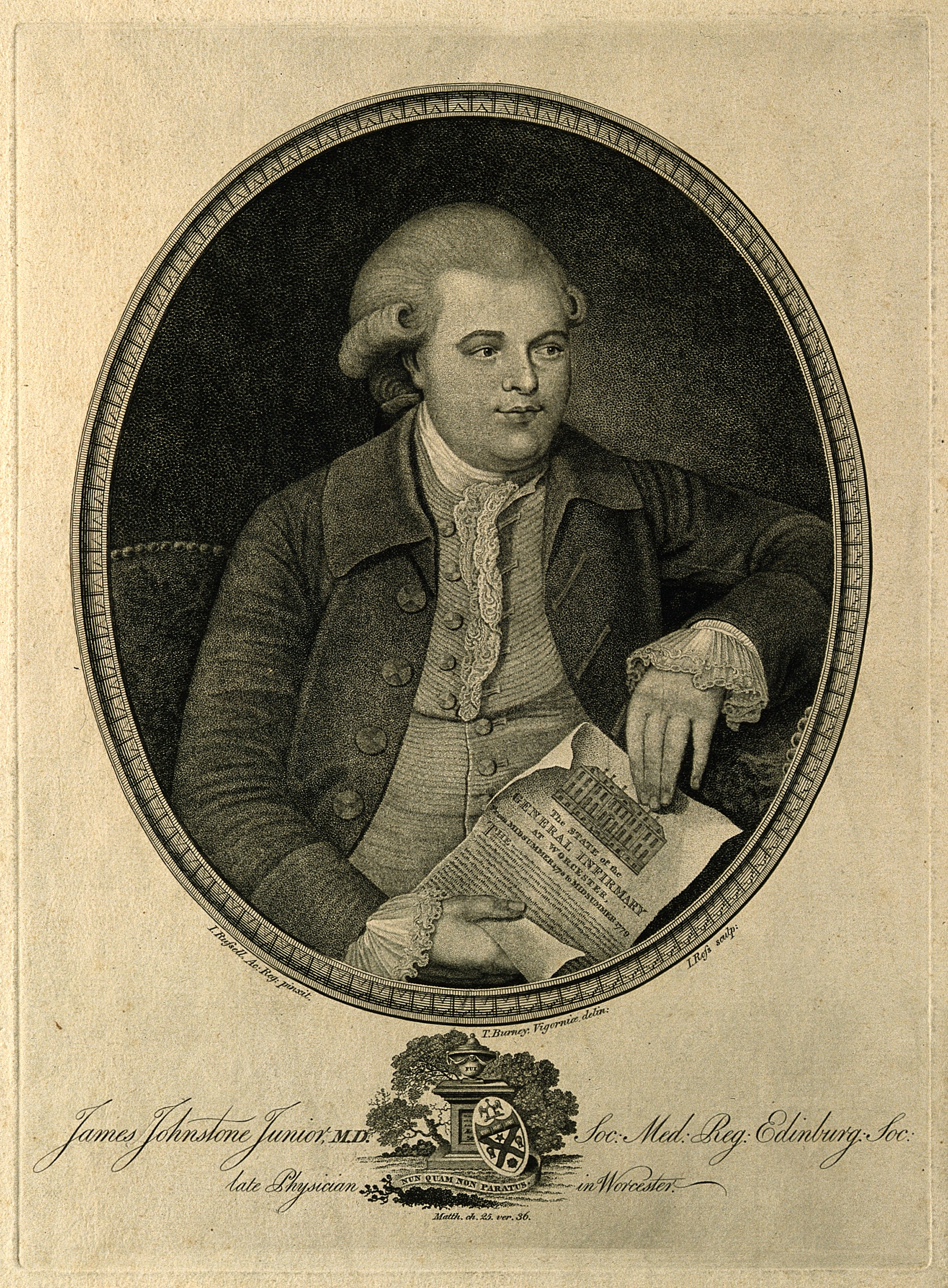
James Johnstone the younger

James Johnstone the younger (1754–1783), physician, the eldest son, born at Kidderminster in August 1754, commenced in 1770 the study of medicine at Edinburgh. Upon being admitted a member of the Medical Society of Edinburgh he distinguished himself by his papers and in the debates, and was honourably noticed by his professors, particularly by Dr. Cullen and Dr. Gregory; to the last he acted as clinical clerk in preparing cases for the lectures at the infirmary. He graduated M.D. at Edinburgh in September 1773. His thesis, ‘De Angina Maligna,’ was recommended to the attention of physicians by Dr. Cullen. It was republished at Worcester in 1779 in an English translation, with considerable additions and some remarks on the angina trachealis. In the summer of 1774 Johnstone was chosen physician to the Worcester Infirmary. When called upon by the county magistrates to visit the prisons where many laboured under gaol fever, he cheerfully undertook the task, but caught the infection and died on 16 August 1783.
