= Hay Mills Rotor Station =

- The helidrome in 1951, with a Westland-Sikorsky S51 on one of the two landing pads. The River Cole is visible, top left.
- IATA: none; ICAO: none

Summary
- Airport type: Helidrome
- Operator: British European Airways
- Serves: Birmingham
- Location: Hay Mills
- Opened: 1 June 1951
- Closed: 15 January 1954
- Passenger services ceased: 9 April 1952
- Coordinates: 52.468278°N 1.831014°W
- Interactive map of Hay Mills Rotor Station

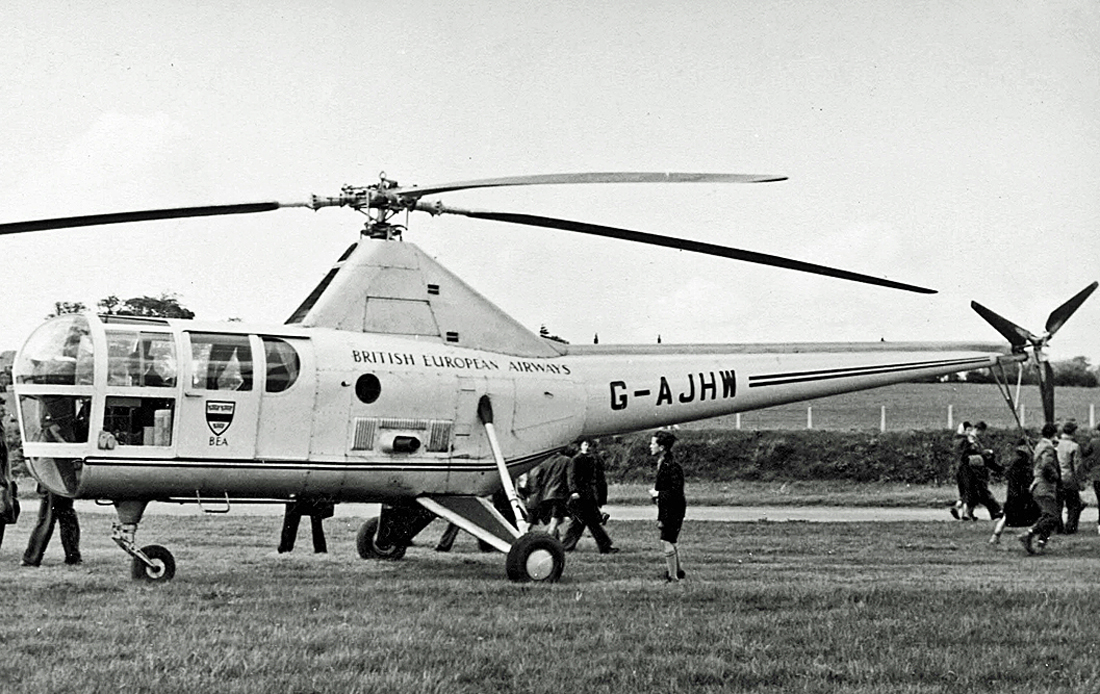
BEA's S-51, G-AJHW, seen at an unspecified location in 1953

Hay Mills Rotor Station (or Rotorstation) was a helidrome in the Hay Mills district of southern Birmingham, England, which was operational from 1951 to 1954.

== Location ==
The choice of a suburban location away from the city centre was influenced by the fact that single-engine helicopters available at the time were not allowed to fly over built-up areas, in case of engine failure. The site, using part of a recreation ground, was bounded by Coventry Road (the A45), Heybarnes Road, Hob Moor Road and the River Cole, and lay approximately equidistant between Birmingham city centre and Birmingham Airport.

== Operations ==
The helidrome had two asphalt landing pads and a wooden terminal building. It hosted services operated by British European Airways (BEA), which flew to Northolt Aerodrome, London, where there were onward connections to London Heathrow. At the time of opening, there were three flights a day to London, operated by Westland-Sikorsky S51 helicopters, registrations G-AJHW and G-AJOV. Flight time to Northolt was 70 minutes.

A Bristol 171 Sycamore, G-AMWH, was used from 13 July 1953.

== Notable flights ==
A "proving flight", flown by Captain J.G. Thielmann and carrying the aeronautical correspondent of The Times, took place on 19 May 1951. Inaugural flights took place on 1 June, and (according to advance news coverage) were scheduled to carry "Lord Pakenham, Minister of Civil Aviation, Mr Frank Berwick, the Parliamentary Secretary, Lord Douglas of Kirtleside, chairman of B.E.A., Lady Douglas, Mr. Peter Masefield, Chief Executive, B.E.A., and Sir George Cribbett, of the Ministry of Civil Aviation", who were to be entertained to lunch by the Lord Mayor of Birmingham, Ralph Yates. The service opened to the public on 4 June.

One of the service's early users was the Member of Parliament for Kidderminster, Gerald Nabarro.

== Closure ==
Passenger services ceased to operate on 9 April 1952, with a freight-only operation continuing until 15 January 1954.
