= Fred Starkey =

English athlete and model (1911–2001)

- Full name: Frederick John Starkey
- Born: 20 February 1911 Hay Mills, Birmingham, England
- Died: 27 January 2001 (aged 89) Sherborne, Dorset, England

Gymnastics career
- Discipline: Men's artistic gymnastics
- Country represented: England

Frederick John Starkey (20 February 1911 – 27 January 2001) was a British amateur athlete who in 1947 represented England at basketball and gymnastics. At the age of 28 he was the model for a sculpture of the Greek god Apollo by William Bloye, which stands in Coronation Gardens, Ednam Road, Dudley.

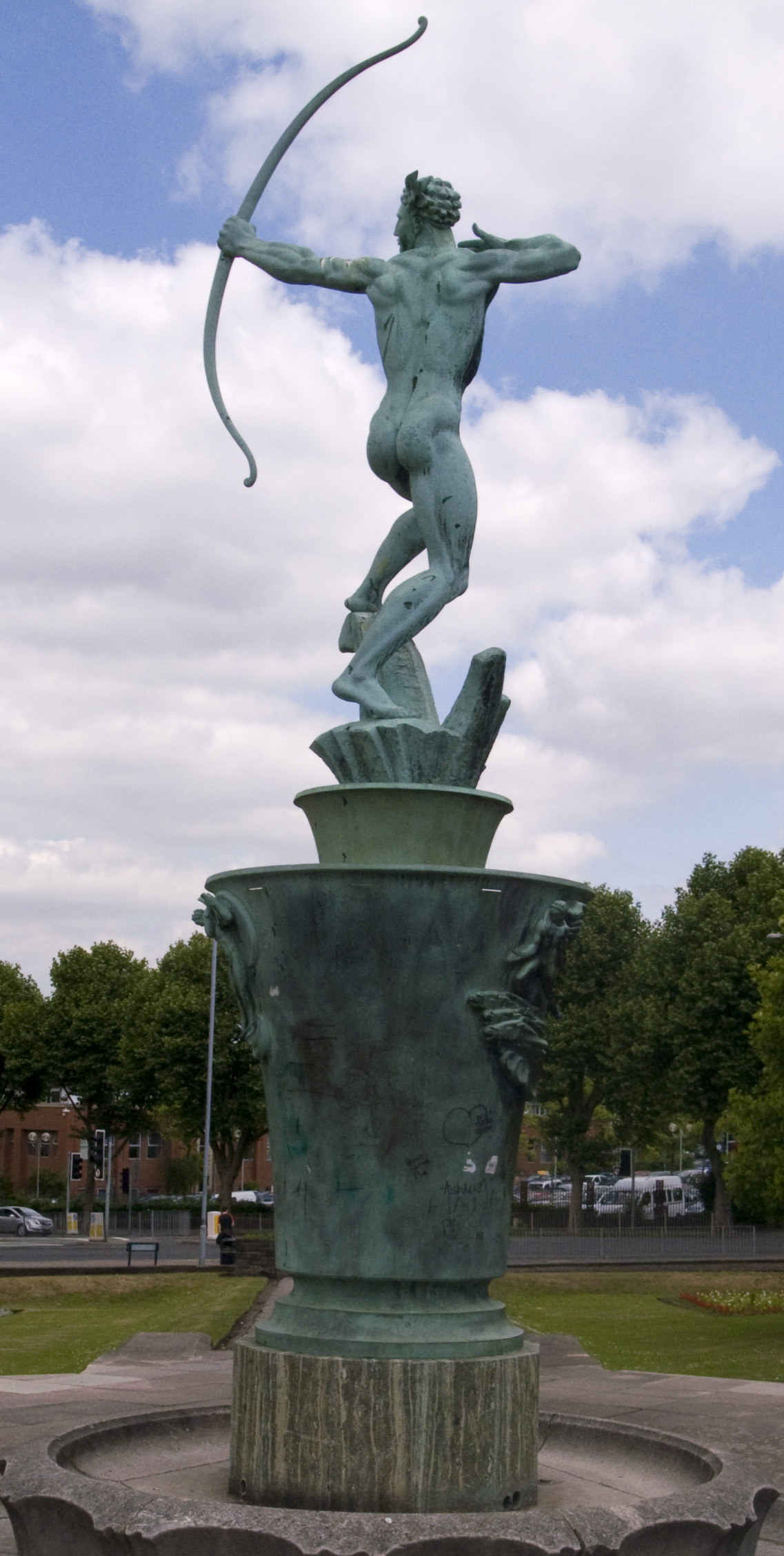
Starkey modelled for this statue of Apollo

Starkey was born in George Avenue, Hay Mills, Birmingham. In later life he worked as a probation officer in Birmingham. He died in Sherborne, Dorset, aged 89.
