= Joseph Webster (industrialist) =

English industrialist (1783–1856)

Joseph Webster III (1783–1856) of Penns was an English industrialist in the West Midlands. As an ironmaster, he managed the family business in wire drawing, building up a company that was a precursor of Webster & Horsfall.

== Early life and background ==
He was the eldest son of Joseph Webster II (1750–1788) and his wife Phoebe Parkes; his father died of a fall while hunting at Chelmsley Wood. Phoebe was the daughter of John Parkes, a linen draper of Warwick; she was the sister of John Parkes, a worsted manufacturer of the Warwick textile mill Parkes, Brookhouse & Crompton, and aunt of Josiah Parkes and Joseph Parkes. She ran the family business from 1788 to 1801.

Webster was educated at the Birmingham school of the Presbyterian minister Radcliffe Scholefield. He was then sent to the boarding school at Birches Green run by John Corrie.

== Mill-owner ==
In 1801 Joseph Webster took over the family business from his mother Phoebe, running it with John William Crompton to 1819. Crompton was a Birmingham merchant, the second son of Samuel Crompton of Gainsborough and Clapham, and his wife Hannah Woodhouse (died 1817); he had married Joseph Webster's sister Martha. There were two mills, one near the site of the disused Penns railway station to the west of Walmley, then a hamlet, which made wire, and the Plants Forge steel mill at Minworth. These sites both lay on Plants Brook which runs into the River Tame, a source of water power. There were two further wire mills at Perry Barr, Hints Forge at Hints, Staffordshire, and business premises in Birmingham in Digbeth and on Mount Street.

In business terms, Webster's most significant move was the acquisition in the early 1820s of a steel mill at Killamarsh in north-east Derbyshire, while Plants Forge was partially converted to wire manufacture. It meant first a transition to Sheffield steel. Killamarsh was positioned close to the South Yorkshire Coalfield, and the manager John Bird there picked up on manganese steel that was a Sheffield innovation. Applied to piano wire, it gave Webster a product that came to dominate the international market. Mills he controlled on the tributaries of the Tame and River Cole switched between wire and paper.

== Local politics ==
In 1812 Webster was Low Bailiff of Birmingham, an official of the court leet that was the manorial local government institution at the time. Under an unspoken rule, the High Bailiff was an Anglican, but the Low Bailiff might be a nonconformist. That year saw protest meetings against the Orders in Council that formed part of the trade war of the Napoleonic Wars, addressed in Birmingham by Richard Spooner, an associate of Thomas Attwood, High Bailiff from 1811. Webster, Joshua Scholefield and Samuel Tertius Galton were drawn into the movement for European peace. Peter Payne, a Foxite admirer of Napoleon and since 1811 Webster's father-in-law, weighed into the controversy with a pseudonymous pamphlet, though distrustful of Spooner. Webster as a manufacturer gave evidence against the Orders in Council, and by November 1812 was organising a committee for a petition and correspondence with other areas. By early 1813, when he was writing to Josiah Wedgwood II about the movement, he had found that momentum was being lost.

== Religion ==
Webster was a prominent Unitarian, on good terms with Josiah Mason, for whose Wesleyan Sunday school he provided furniture. His son Joseph was ordained in the Church of England, and became rector of Hindlip in 1838.

St John the Evangelist, Walmley, 2020 photograph

The church St John the Evangelist, Walmley, consecrated 1845, was founded by a group including Webster. By 1860 there were monuments in the church to Webster and his wife, their daughter Frances and their daughter-in-law Anna Maria née Pipe-Wolferstan. The design of Henry John Whitling was completed by the Birmingham architect Daniel Rowlinson Hill.

== Family ==
By his marriage of 1811 to Maria Mary Payne, daughter of Peter Payne MP, Joseph Webster had 12 children.

The second son was Baron Dickinson Webster, who became a partner in the family business in 1842. The fourth son Peter Charles Gillies Webster (1830–1877) was of the 8th Hussars. He was the author of an 1870 work on the Staffordshire Yeomanry, and Notes, Genealogical, Historical & Heraldic, Relating to the Websters, of Flamborough, London & Warwickshire, posthumously published in 1880.

Stained glass windows by Charles Eamer Kempe in the chapel of Hospital of St John Baptist without the Barrs, commemorating Peter Charles Gillies Webster

Other children were:

- Rev. Joseph Webster (died 1858), eldest son, graduate of Trinity College, Oxford. He married his second cousin Elizabeth Findlay, daughter of the Glasgow banker Robert Findlay of Easterhill and Elizabeth Buchanan, daughter of John Buchanan, MP for Dunbartonshire and his wife Elizabeth Parkes, sister of Phoebe Webster.
- Eldest daughter Maria Mary Payne Webster (1813–1859) married in 1834 James Johnstone (1805–1869), second son of the physician Edward Johnstone, and had a large family. Their fifth daughter Fanny Matilda married in 1869 Horace Boileau Goad.
- The second daughter was Janet Millett.

The Webster family vault is in the churchyard at Holy Trinity Church, Sutton Coldfield.
