= Penns Hall =

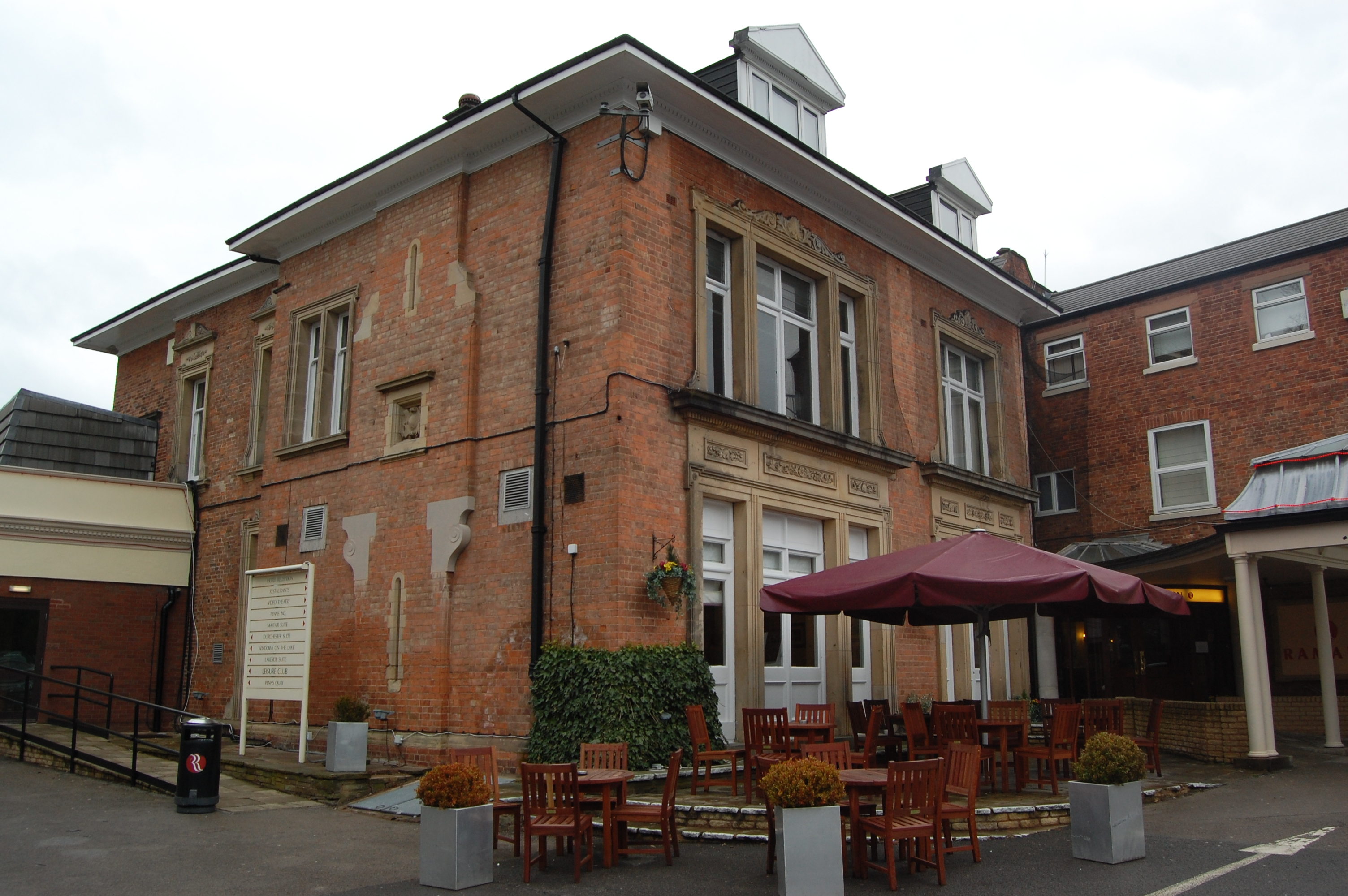
- The hall in 2013

General information
- Type: Hotel (formerly private residence)
- Location: Walmley, Sutton Coldfield, Birmingham, England
- Coordinates: 52°32′11.77″N 1°48′27.59″W
- Renovated: 1950
- Owner: Ramada International

Website
- www.ramadasuttonhotel.co.uk

Penns Hall is a building on Penns Lane, Walmley, Sutton Coldfield, Birmingham, England, operated as a hotel and country club by Ramada International. The complex is now closed to the public due to the housing of asylum seekers. It is a Grade B locally listed building, and is licensed as a venue for civil marriages and civil partnerships.

Plants Brook, a tributary of the River Tame, flows through its grounds. A long pool formed by the damming of Plants Brook named Penns Lake is also part of the hotel grounds. This is today used as a carp fishing lake operated by Fosters Fisheries.

== History ==
In 1618, John Penn was operating two water mills for corn milling and for blade sharpening in Sutton Coldfield.

The Websters, a Presbyterian family, operated a blade mill at Perry Barr, Birmingham and in about 1750, Joseph Webster I acquired the additional lease of the Penns Mills which property in 1776 comprised a house and two dwellings adjoining a wire mill and a fulling mill, called Penns Mills.

He and his son Joseph Webster II developed a wire drawing business and additional premises were taken on at Plants Mill and Hints Forge. Joseph Webster III further expanded operations and in 1812 built cottages for the workers adjacent to the mills. He was warden of Sutton Coldfield in 1810.

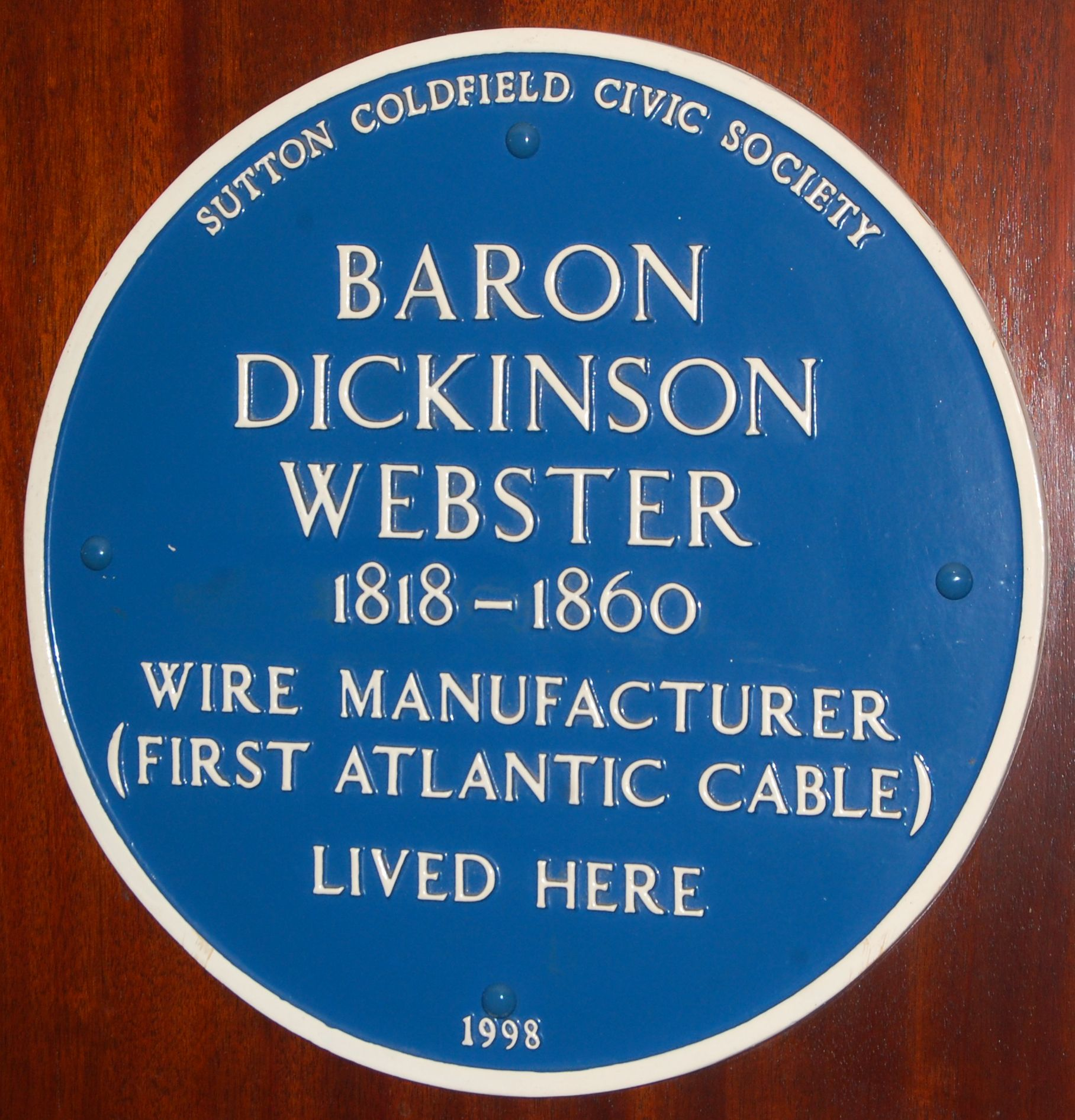
Blue plaque honouring Baron Dickinson Webster

By 1812, when Joseph Webster IV was born, Penns Hall had become a substantial mansion; on census day in 1851 it was employing 105 men and 43 boys at the mills. He was also farming 30 acres (120,000 m^{2}). His brother Baron Dickinson Webster, born 1818, was a justice of the peace, a freemason, a member of the Aston Union and of the turnpike trust and was warden of the town in 1844 and in 1855–1858. A man of some prominence, he was much involved in the negotiations with railway companies regarding their plans for routes to and through Sutton Coldfield. His business interests included the manufacture of wire, and in 1998 a blue plaque was erected at the hall by the Sutton Coldfield Civic Society, honouring his involvement in the first transatlantic telegraph cable.

In 1855, the business of Websters was merged with that of Horsfall at Hay Mills, Birmingham and, in 1859, the whole business was transferred to Hay Mills and the Penns Mills were closed down, with serious financial consequences for many workers and the economy of the Walmley area of Sutton Coldfield. Webster died in 1860 and in 1865, Penns Hall was bought by James Horsfall, whose son Henry was resident there in 1891. In 1947, the property was sold to Ansells who in 1950 converted it into a hotel.

During the 1980s, the hotel became famous as the location for exterior filming of the British television soap opera Crossroads. The hotel filled in as the Crossroads Motel (later known as the Kings Oak Country Hotel) and the entrance to the real hotel's conference facilities was dressed to look like the main entrance to the fictional hotel. A shot of some of the hotel rooms overlooking Penns Lake, which is on the hotel's land, were used as part of the closing credits to the show.
