= Shim =

Shim may refer to:

- Shim (spacer), a thin and often tapered or wedged piece of material
  - CPU shim, a spacer for a computer heat sink
  - Shim (fencing), a device used in the sport fencing
  - Shim (lock pick), a tool used to bypass padlocks
- Shim (computing), an application compatibility workaround
- Shim (magnetism), a device used to adjust the homogeneity of a magnetic field
- Shim (band), an Australian hard rock band

== Microscopy ==
- Second-harmonic imaging microscopy
- Scanning helium ion microscope

== People ==
- Shim (surname)
- Sim (Korean surname), pronounced "shim"
- Shim (musician) (born 1983), Israeli singer-songwriter and artist

== See also ==
- Shimmer (disambiguation)
- Shimon (disambiguation)
- Sim (disambiguation)
