= Shěn =

Shen (沈)
- Pronunciation: Shěn (Mandarin); Sim (Hokkien); Sim (Teochew); Shum (Cantonese); Shim (Hakka); Shim (Korean) [심] Thẩm (Vietnamese)
- Language: Chinese, Vietnamese, Korean

Origin
- Language: Old Chinese
- Meaning: to sink

Other names
- Variant forms: Sam, Sheem, Sum, Sham, Shin, Sin
- See also: Shum, Shim

Shěn is the Mandarin Hanyu pinyin romanization of the Chinese surname 沈.

Shen is the 14th surname in the Song-era Hundred Family Surnames. It is also colloquially known as the "common Chinese person" in text and sentences. The surname 沈 ranked 14th during the Song dynasty due to the prominence of the family and not the numerical count of members of the family at that time.

== Romanisation ==
沈 is romanised as Sum, Sem, Sam, Sham, or Shum in Cantonese; Sim in Hokkien and Teochew; Shim (심) in Hakka and in Korean; and Thẩm/Trầm in Vietnamese. The family name can also be written as "Shin" or "Sin" as well.

Less commonly, the same character can also be pronounced Zhen, which indicates a different origin from Shen.

== Distribution ==
Shen was the 52nd-most-common surname in the People's Republic of China (China) in 2020 according to the Ministry of Public Security and ranked 40th in the 100 most common surnames in the Republic of China (Taiwan) in 2018 by the Ministry of the Interior. In the Republic of Korea 沈/심 ranked 32nd amongst the top 100 South Korean surnames in 2015. According to China's 2013 Fuxi Cultural Research (中華伏羲文化研究會), there are approximately 5.5 million 沈's accounting for 0.41% of the Han Chinese population and placed 49th out of the 400 Chinese surnames in mainland China. The highest concentration of 沈 is in the Eastern Chinese coastal provinces of Jiangsu and Zhejiang which represents about 36% of all 沈s in China. A remaining 37% of all 沈s in China inhabit these 7 neighbouring provinces & cities of Shanghai, Anhui, Henan, Guangdong, Hubei, Guizhou and Shandong. As of the top 30 cities in China, top ranking last names rank 沈 as 6th most common in Hangzhou during 2011 and 8th most common in Shanghai during 2018.

In 2015, South Korea's population of 沈 is less than 1% of the country's population or 272,049 people. In 2009, Singapore's population of 沈 accounted for 0.9% of the city's population or 23,800 people. In 2006, Hangzhou's population of 沈 was 3.09% of the city's population or 202,358 people.

Although Chinese make up the largest part of America's Asian and Pacific Islander population, none of the romanizations of "沈" appeared among the 1000 most common surnames during the AD 2000 US census although "shen" ranked #3690, "shum" ranked #13,730, "shim" ranked #7576, "tham" ranked #21,829. In the 1990 US census however, "shen" ranked #10,565, "shum" ranked #22,632, "shim" ranked #9771, "tham" ranked #28,237.

== Family clans ==
There are a multitude (郡望) of choronymic 沈 family clans throughout East Asia such as the Cheongsong 沈/심 Korean clan and the Danzhutou 沈 Hakka clan in the Southern Chinese city of Shenzhen. A genealogy book (族谱) usually consists of a generation name (字輩) and a generation number that coincides with that particular generation name. Altogether, a generation poem (派字歌) of up to 40 generation names could exist.

The generation poem for Danzhutou as depicted below.

士成肇光广，元会运其祥；(shi cheng zhao guang guang, yuan hui yun qi xiang)
谦恭登上达，和蔼显标扬；(qian gong deng shang da, he ai xian biao yang)

The generation poem for Cheongsong as depicted below.

지능의택상，섭재보규용；(ji neung ui taek sang, seop jae bo gyu yong)

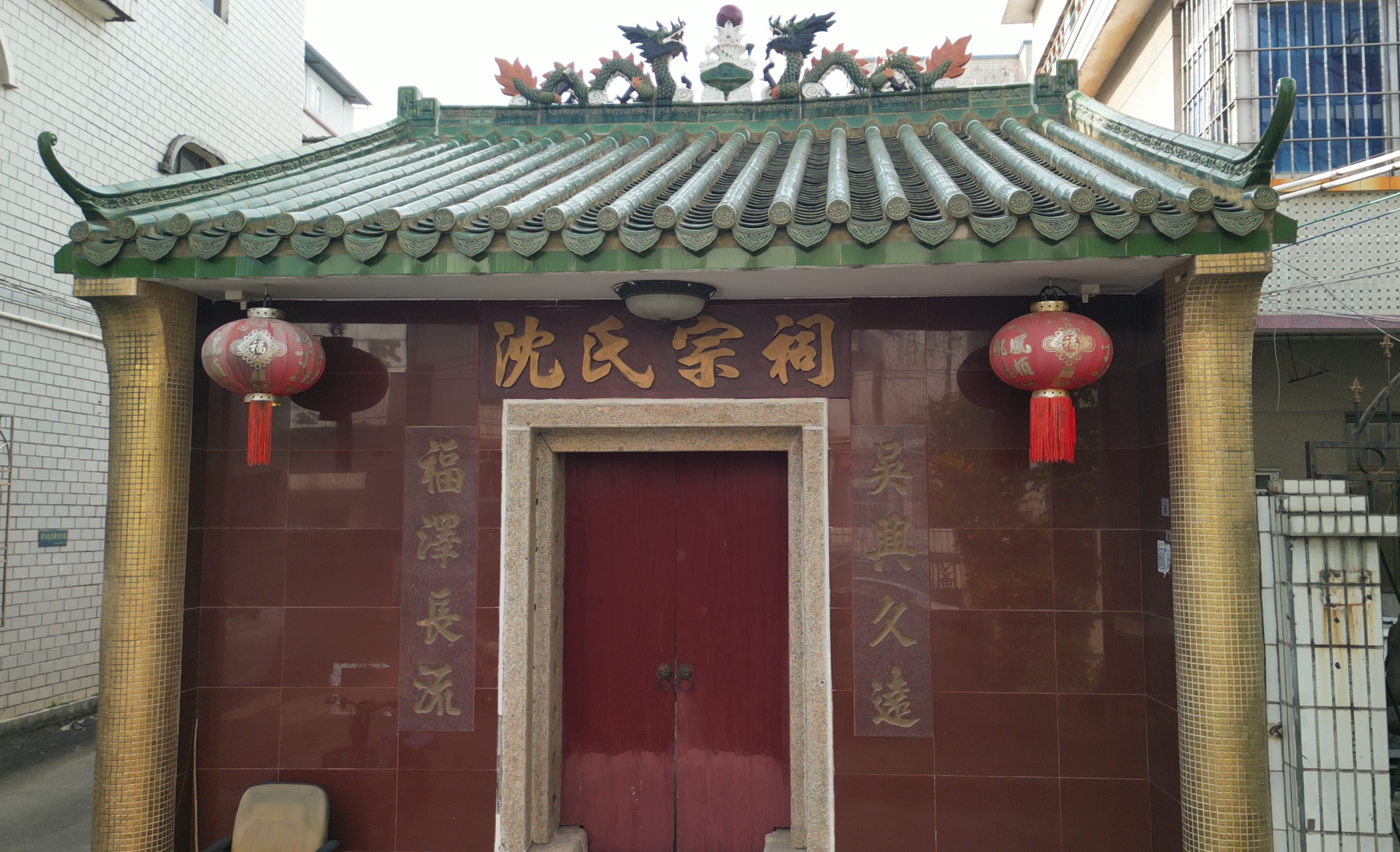
Shim Ancestral Hall in Shenzhen

Ancestor veneration in China (中国传统宗法性宗教) is very common amongst family clans to maintain Chinese kin (宗族) and pay tribute to filial piety. Most often an ancestral shrine (祠堂) represents the progenitor of the family clan. Many overseas Chinese (华侨华人) return to their ancestral home (籍贯) to pay respect to those ancestors who came before them. Additional ancestors are placed in a spirit tablet (牌位) alongside the progenitor, which is common practice in Confucianism.

== Origins ==
As is common with Chinese surnames, the modern Shen family arose from various unrelated sources.

One origin traces it to the Shen (沈) kingdom in Runan County, Henan. These people were descended from Shao Hao, whose grandson was Zhuanxu's teacher and fathered Yun Ge and Tai Dai. Tai Dai was granted Shanxi for his achievements in controlling the flooding of the Yellow River and his descendants divided into four "kingdoms": the Shen, the Yi, the Ru, and the Huang. Electing not to participate in the northern kingdoms' campaign against Chu in 506 BC, Shen was invaded and destroyed by Cai. The rulers and vassals of the former state then bore the clan name Shen to distinguish themselves.

Another group descended from the rulers and vassals of the revived state of Shen after King Cheng granted it to the Zhou prince Ran Ji for suppressing the rebellion following the death of his brother King Wu.

A third group derived from the Mi (芈) family of Chu during the Spring and Autumn period. Chu had conquered the area of Shen and, in 506 BC, its governor was Shenyin Shu – a Chu field marshal from a cadet branch of the royal house. He was killed in the Battle of Boju that year, opposing a Wu invasion led by Wu Zixu and Sun Tzu. In his memory, some of his descendants and vassals adopted the clan name Shen for his fief, while others became the Ye after the fief granted to Shenyin Shu's son Shen Zhuliang, better known as the Duke of Ye (葉公, Ye Gong).

== Branches ==
The You clan (尤) is said to be a branch of the Shen clan, having simply removed the side-water radical 氵 from their surname sometime in the 10th century due to conflict with a different Shen (审) ruling family in Fujian Province. Owing to this, the You and Shen continued to be unable to intermarry, just as if they were still a single clan.

The side-water radical (氵: shuǐ) plus (冘: yín) results in the Chinese character surname (沈: shěn).

== Historical figures ==
- 沈括 – Shen Kuo, ancient polymathic scientist
- 沈約 – Shen Yue, poet, statesman, and historian
- 沈周 – Shen Zhou, Chinese painter in the Ming dynasty
- 沈法興 – Shen Faxing, official of the Chinese Sui dynasty
- 沈倫 – Shen Lun, scholar-official
- 沈万三 – Shen Wansan, businessman during the beginning of Ming dynasty
- 沈福宗 – Michael Shen Fu-Tsung, first Qing Chinese to have visited Europe
- 沈婺華 – Shen Wuhua, empress of Chen China
- 沈妙容 – Shen Miaorong, empress of the Chinese Chen dynasty
- 沈铨 – Shen Quan, Chinese painter during the Qing dynasty
- 沈光文 – Shen Guangwen, scholar, poet, educator
- 沈葆禎 – Shen Baozhen, Chinese official during the Qing dynasty
- 沈崧 – Shen Song, chancellor of the Chinese Five Dynasties and Ten Kingdoms period state Wuyue
- 沈壽 – Shen Shou, Chinese embroiderer during the late Qing and early Republican period
- 沈泽民 – Shen Zemin, one of the earliest members of the Chinese Communist Party
- 沈劍虹 – James Shen, Taiwanese diplomat
- 沈鸿英 – Shen Hongying, Chinese general and military governor of Guangdong
- 沈金鑑 – Shen Jinjian, politician of the Republic of China

== Modern people with the surname ==
=== Mainland China and Hong Kong, China ===
- 沈仲章 – Chung-Chang Shen, Chinese linguist, folklorist, ethnomusicologist, and antiquarian
- 沈从文 – Shen Congwen, one of the greatest modern Chinese writers
- 沈定成 – Shen Dingcheng, a Chinese businessman and oil and gas executive
- 沈定一 – Shen Dingyi, a 1920s-era Chinese revolutionary and intellectual
- 沈铎 – Shen Duo, a Chinese competitive swimmer
- 沈浮 – Shen Fu, Chinese film director
- 沈宏非 – Shen Hongfei, a writer, producer and food columnist in China
- 沈金龙 – Shen Jinlong, current commander of the Chinese People's Liberation Army Navy
- 沈静思 – Shen Jingsi, a Chinese volleyball player
- 沈军 – Shen Jun, a Chinese billionaire businessman, founder of East Money Information
- 沈钧儒 – Shen Junru, a Chinese lawyer, political figure
- 沈龙元 – Shen Longyuan, a Chinese football player
- 沈南鹏 – Neil Shen, a Chinese billionaire venture capitalist
- 沈培平 – Shen Peiping, a former Chinese politician from Yunnan province
- 沈少民 – Shen Shaomin, an artist based in Sydney, and Beijing
- 沈星扬 – Shen Sinyan, an American physicist and classical composer
- 沈石溪 – Shen Shixi, a children's author
- 沈腾 – Shen Teng, a Chinese comedian and actor
- 沈田峰 – Shen Tianfeng, a Chinese football player
- 沈天慧 – Shen Tianhui, renowned chemist and professor at Shanghai Jiao Tong University
- 沈彤 – Shen Tong, a Chinese-American social activist, impact investor, writer
- 沈伟 – Shen Wei, Chinese-born American choreographer, visual artist, and director
- 沈晓明 – Shen Xiaoming, a Chinese politician, serving since 2017 as the Governor of Hainan
- 沈燕飞 – Shen Yanfei, a Chinese-born table tennis player
- 沈勇平 – Shen Yongping, a Chinese filmmaker
- 沈月 – Shen Yue, a Chinese actress
- 沈跃跃 – Shen Yueyue, a Chinese politician
- 沈志华 – Shen Zhihua, a professor of history at East China Normal University
- 沈祖伦 – Shen Zulun, a politician of the People's Republic of China
- 沈向洋 – Harry Shum, Executive Vice President of Artificial Intelligence & Research at Microsoft
- 沈卓盈 – Jess Sum, an actress in Hong Kong under TVB
- 沈觀健 – Ken Sim, Vancouver mayor from 2022 to 2026
- 沈殿霞 – Lydia Shum, a Hong Kong comedian, MC, and actress
- 沈小艾 – Mina Shum, independent Canadian filmmaker

=== Taiwan, Malaysia and Singapore ===
- 沈昌煥 – Shen Chang-huan, Minister of Foreign Affairs (Taiwan)
- 沈哲哉 – Shen Che-Tsai, Taiwanese painter
- 沈君山 – Shen Chun-shan, Taiwanese academic
- 沈榮津 – Shen Jong-chin, Minister of Economic Affairs (Taiwan)
- 沈呂巡 – Shen Lyu-shun, Taiwanese diplomat
- 沈炜竣 – Shen Weijun, Singaporean actor and singer
- 沈一鳴 – Shen Yi-ming, Deputy Minister of National Defense (Taiwan)
- 沈世宏 – Stephen Shen, Minister of Environmental Protection Administration of the Republic of China
- 沈同钦 – Sim Tong Him, Malaysian politician
- 沈望傅 – Sim Wong Hoo, CEO and Chairman of Creative Technology
- 沈財福 – Ron Sim, founder of Osim International
- 沈銳華 – Jack Sim, founder of Restroom Association of Singapore, the World Toilet Organization
- 沈颖 – Sim Ann, Singapore Senior Minister of State
- 沈？？ – Desmond Sim Singaporean playwright
- 沈家玉 – Jasmine Sim, Singaporean actress
- 沈琳宸 – Sheila Sim (Singaporean actress)
- 沈威胜 – Welson Sim, Malaysian professional swimmer
- 沈克栋 – Sin Kek Tong, Singaporean politician
