= Shim (Korean surname) =

Korean surname

Origin
- Region of origin: Korean Peninsula

Other names
- See also: Shěn

Korean name
- Hangul: 심
- Hanja: 沈
- RR: Sim
- MR: Sim

Shim or Sim (Korean: 심) is a Korean surname. There are six Shim clans in Korea based in the regions of Cheongsong, Pungsan, Samcheok, Buyu, Uiryeong, and Jeonju. The biggest Shim clan is Cheongsong; they comprise about 85% of all those with the surname Shim. Fourteen percent of all Korean Shims are members of the Pungsan and Samcheok clans. As of 2000, there were 252,255 people with this surname in South Korea, less than 1% of the population.

== Notable people with the surname ==
- Anthony Shim (born 1986), Canadian actor and filmmaker
- Shim Bo-seon (born 1970), South Korean poet and university professor
- Sim Bok-seok (1928–1998), South Korean long-distance runner
- Sim Bong-geun (born 1943), South Korean archaeologist and university professor
- Shim Chang-min (born 1988), singer-songwriter and actor, member of boy band TVXQ
- Sim Chang-min (baseball) (born 1993), South Korean baseball player
- Sim Chol-ho (1960–2014), North Korean engineer and politician
- Shim Dal-gi (born 1999), South Korean actress
- Sim Deok-seop (born 1963), South Korean sprinter
- Shim Dong-woon (born 1990), South Korean former professional footballer
- Shim Eui-sik (born 1969), South Korean former professional ice hockey forward and Korean hockey point record holder
- Shim Eun-ha (born 1972), South Korean retired actress
- Shim Eun-jin (born 1981), South Korean actress and singer, former member of girl group Baby V.O.X
- Shim Eun-kyung (born 1994), South Korean actress
- Shim Eun-woo (born Park So-ri, 1992), South Korean actress
- Sim Gyu-hae (born 1965), South Korean former sailor
- Sim Hae-in (born 1987), South Korean handball player
- Sim Hun (1901–1936), South Korean writer
- Shim Hwa-jin (born 1956), South Korean academic, former president of Sungshin Women's University
- Shim Hye-jin (born 1966), South Korean actress and model
- Shim Hye-won (stage name Belle, born 2004), American singer-songwriter, member of girl group Kiss of Life
- Shim Hyung-rae (born 1958), South Korean former comedian and filmmaker
- Shim Hyung-tak (born 1978), South Korean actor
- Shim Jae-chul (born 1958), South Korean journalist and politician
- Shim Jae-hong (born 1968), South Korean former handball player, Olympic silver medalist
- Shim Jae-min (born 1994), South Korean baseball player
- Sim Jae-myung (born 1989), South Korean footballer
- Sim Jae-won (born 1977), South Korean footballer
- Shim Jae-young (born 1968), South Korean gymnast
- Sim Jae-young (born 1995), South Korean taekwondo athlete
- Sim Jae-yun (stage name Jake, born 2002), South Korean-Australian singer, member of boy band ENHYPEN
- Shim Je-hyeok (born 1995), South Korean footballer
- Shim Jeong-soo (born 1975), South Korean former professional baseball player
- Shim Ji-ho (born 1981), South Korean actor
- Shim Jung-man (born 1962), South Korean handball player
- Shim Jung-sub (born 1991), South Korean long-distance runner
- Keong Sim (born 1969), American actor
- Sim Kwon-ho (born 1972), South Korean Greco Roman wrestler, Olympic gold medalist
- Shim Mina (born 1972), South Korean singer and dancer
- Shim Min-ji (born 1983), South Korean former swimmer
- Sim Mun-seop (born 1932), South Korean former sports shooter
- Sim Myeong-hui (born 1925), South Korean former sports shooter
- Shim Na-yeon (born 1987), South Korean director
- Sim On (1375–1419), Joseon government official and father of Queen Soheon
- Sim Sa-jeong (1707–1769), Joseon painter
- Sim Sang-dae (born 1960), South Korean writer
- Shim Sang-ho (born 1959), South Korean businessman
- Sim Sang-jung (born 1959), South Korean labor rights activist and former politician
- Sim Sang-min (born 1993), South Korean footballer
- Sim Sang-ok (born 1933), South Korean middle-distance runner
- Shim Seo-yeon (born 1989), South Korean retired footballer
- Sim Seung-seob (born 1963), the 33rd Chief of Naval Operations for the Republic of Korea Navy
- Sim So-myung (born 1984), South Korean esports player and poker player
- Shim So-young (born 1970), South Korean actress
- Sim Soo-bong (born 1955), South Korean singer
- Shim Soo-chang (born 1981), South Korean baseball player
- Shim Soon-taek (1824–1906), Korean politician
- Shim Suk-hee (born 1997), South Korean short track speed skater, Olympic gold medalist
- Shim Sung-bo (born 1972), South Korean film director and screenwriter
- Sim Sung-young (born 1992), South Korean basketball player
- Shim Ui-gyeom (1535–1587), Joseon philosopher and politician
- Shim Wan-joon (born 1980), South Korean actor
- Shim Wan-koo (1938–2020), South Korean politician
- Sim Woo-jun (born 1995), South Korean baseball player
- Sim Woo-yeon (born 1985), South Korean footballer
- Sim Woon-sub (born 1990), South Korean professional footballer
- Shim Yi-young (born Kim Jin-ah, 1980), South Korean actress
- Shim Young-jip (born 1973), South Korean paralympic sport shooter, Paralympic bronze medalist
- Shim Young-sung (born 1987), South Korean retired professional footballer
- Sim Yu-jin (born 1999), South Korean badminton player
- Sim Yunkyung (born 1972), South Korean writer

== List of Cheongsong Shim's generation names ==
- 19th: Ji (0지, 0之)
- 20th: Neung (능0, 能0)
- 21st: Ui (의0, 宜0)
- 22nd: Taek (0택, 0澤)
- 23rd: Sang (상0, 相0)
- 24th: Seop (0섭, 0燮)
- 25th: Jae (재0, 載0)
- 26th: Bo (0보, 0輔)
- 27th: Gyu (규0, 揆0)
- 28th: Yong (0용, 0用)
- 29th: Yeong (영0, 寧0)
- 30th: Gi (0기, 0起)
- 31st: Jang (장0, 章0)
- 32nd: Hu (0후, 0厚)

== Emblem of Cheongsong Shim ==
The Cheongsong Shim clan's emblem depicts rivers, pines, and the Hanja for Shim. In Korea, rivers and pines signify human longevity. The circle was modeled on the Sun and the Moon, which symbolize that descendants will move forward, succeed, and be worthy of their ancestors.

== Genealogical table ==
In 2002, a version of Cheongsong Shim genealogical tables was published as a book. It includes 10 volumes of genealogical tables, an index, and an introduction to the history of the Cheongsong Shim clan. According to an officer of the Cheongsong Shim, they will eventually publish other genealogical tables on the internet.

== Family feud ==
When the tomb of Yun Kwan was rediscovered in the 18th century, it sparked a 300-year-old family feud between the Yun and Shim clans. The reason for the feud was because a member of the Shim clan was buried uphill from Yun Kwan's tomb, destroying part of the original tomb in the process. The feud was finally settled in 2008.

== See also ==
- List of Korean family names
