= Bogwangsa Temple, Cheongsong =

Buddhist temple in South Korea

Bogwangsa Temple
- Location within South Korea

Religion
- Affiliation: Buddhism

Location
- Location: Deok-ri, Cheongsong-eup, Cheongsong County, Gyeongsangbuk-do
- Country: South Korea
- Coordinates: 36.4177°N 129.0437°E

Architecture
- Elevation: 306 m (1,004 ft)

- Bogwangsa Temple, Cheongsong
- Hangul: 보광사
- Hanja: 普光寺
- RR: Bogwangsa
- MR: Pogwangsa

Bogwangsa Temple (Korean: 보광사) is a Budddhist temple (one of many with the same name) located in Cheongsong County, Gyeongsangbuk-do, in South Korea.

Without clear historical evidence, tradition holds that the temple was established in 668 by the monk Uisang.

A 1765 chronicle recorded that it was "a guardian temple for the tomb of Sim Hong-bu" and "a prayer house for the Cheongsong Sim clan.

The temple's Geungnakjeon Hall, built in 1615, was designated a National Treasure on December 17, 2014.

The structure has a gabled roof with decorative bracket clusters.
