= Jinan University =

Public university in Guangzhou, Guangdong, China

Coordinates: 23.1280°N 113.3477°E

- 暨南大学
- Former names: Jinan Academy, Jinan School, National Jinan University
- Motto: 忠信笃敬
- Motto in English: loyalty, sincerity, integrity and respect
- Type: National
- Established: Established 1906; 120 years ago Reestablished 1958; 68 years ago
- Parent institution: United Front Work Department of the Chinese Communist Party
- Affiliations: GHMUA
- Chairman: Wan Gang
- President: Xing Feng (邢锋)
- CCP Secretary: Sun Yu (孙彧)
- Faculty: 1917
- Students: 50,535
- Undergraduates: 22,527
- Postgraduates: 10,767
- Location: Tianhe, Guangzhou, Guangdong, China
- Nickname: JNU
- Website: english.jnu.edu.cn

Chinese name
- Simplified Chinese: 暨南大学
- Traditional Chinese: 暨南大學
Transcriptions
Standard Mandarin
- Hanyu Pinyin: Jìnán Dàxué
- Wade–Giles: Chi-nan Ta-hsuëh
Yue: Cantonese
- Yale Romanization: Kei Nàahm Daaih Hohk
- Jyutping: Kei3 Naam4 Daai6 Hok6

Jinan University (/dʒiːˈnɑːn/ JEE-NAHN; JNU, Chinese: 暨南大学) is a national public university in Guangzhou, Guangdong, China. It is affiliated with the United Front Work Department (UFWD) of the Chinese Communist Party (CCP), and managed by the UFWD of CCP, Ministry of Education of China, and the Guangdong Provincial People's Government. The university is part of the Double First-Class Construction and Project 211. It is also one of the 13 Guangdong Province High-Level Universities.

"Jinan" literally means "reaching southward," indicating the university's original mission to disseminate Chinese learning and culture from North to South when it was founded in 1906 in Nanjing. It is the first Chinese university to recruit foreign students and one of the universities with the largest number of international students in China.

== History ==
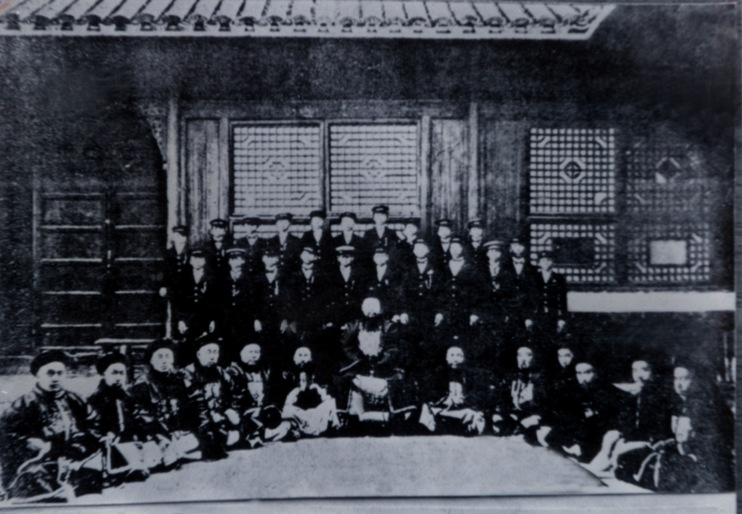
Duanfang and students

In 1906, Duanfang, the Viceroy of Liangjiang, submitted a memorandum to the Guangxu Emperor, proposing that an overseas Chinese school be set up for the purpose of spreading far and wide the enlightening influence of education and strengthening the emotional ties with compatriots overseas. The Guangxu Emperor approved of his proposal and thus Duanfang was honored as the founder of Jinan University. On March 23, 1907, Jinan Academy was founded in Nanjing, becoming the first of its kind in Chinese history and serving as a curtain-raiser for the later development of overseas Chinese education.

In 1927, Jinan Academy was renamed National Jinan University, located in Shanghai. After the foundation of the People's Republic of China in 1949, Jinan University was closed and its schools were merged with those of other university such as Fudan University. In 1958, Jinan University was reestablished in Guangzhou.

=== University name ===
The name "Jinan" (暨南, lit. "reaching southward") comes from the Classic of History, a compilation of documentary records related to events in ancient Chinese history. The articles reads, "His speech and teachings spread from South, from China to the rest of the world.

=== Timeline ===
- 1906 – Jinan Academy, the predecessor of Jinan University was established in Nanjing.
- 1918 – Jinan Academy moved to Shanghai.
- 1927 – Jinan Academy was renamed Jinan National University.
- 1941–1946 – Jinan University moved to Fujian Province during the Second Sino-Japanese War.
- 1949 – Jinan National University was merged into Fudan University and Jiaotong University.
- 1958 – Jinan University was re-established in Guangzhou.
- 1983 – Jinan University pioneered in the country the implementation of credit system.
- 1996 – Jinan University passed the pre-examination of the "211 program" related department and was put into the "top 100 normal universities" list, which would get prior construction in the 21st century.
- 2001 – College of Journalism and Communication, College of Information Science and Technology, College of Foreign Studies, Pharmacy College, Law School and International School were established.
- 2002 – Jinan University started to launch EMBA Program with approval from the Degree Administration Office of the State Council. As one of the first group of universities.
- 2006 – The celebration ceremony of the 100th Anniversary of Jinan University was held.
- 2011 – The Graduate School of Jinan University was established.
- 2014 – The new campus was established in Guangzhou Higher Education Mega Center.

== Location and campus ==
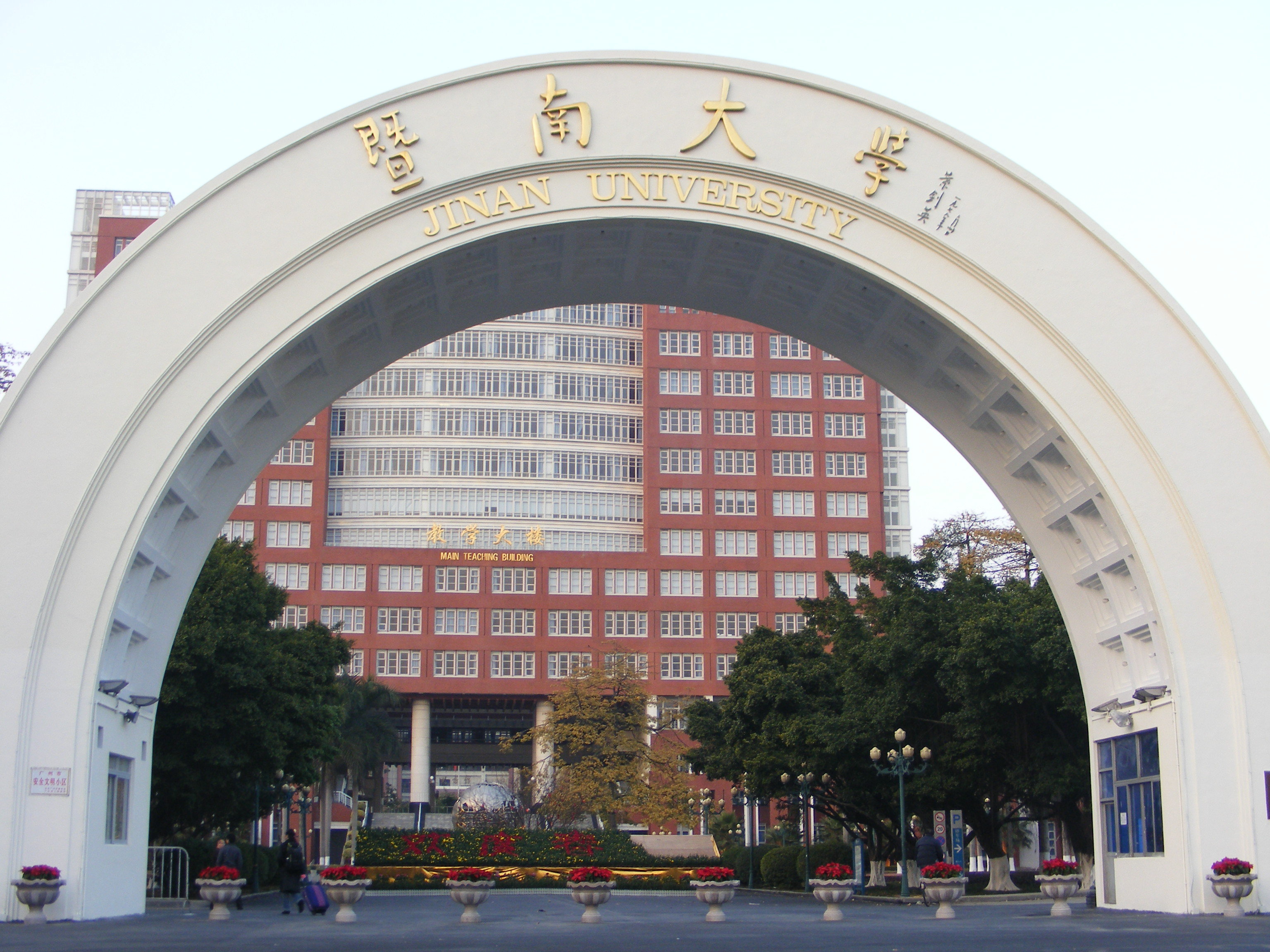
Gate of the Main Campus

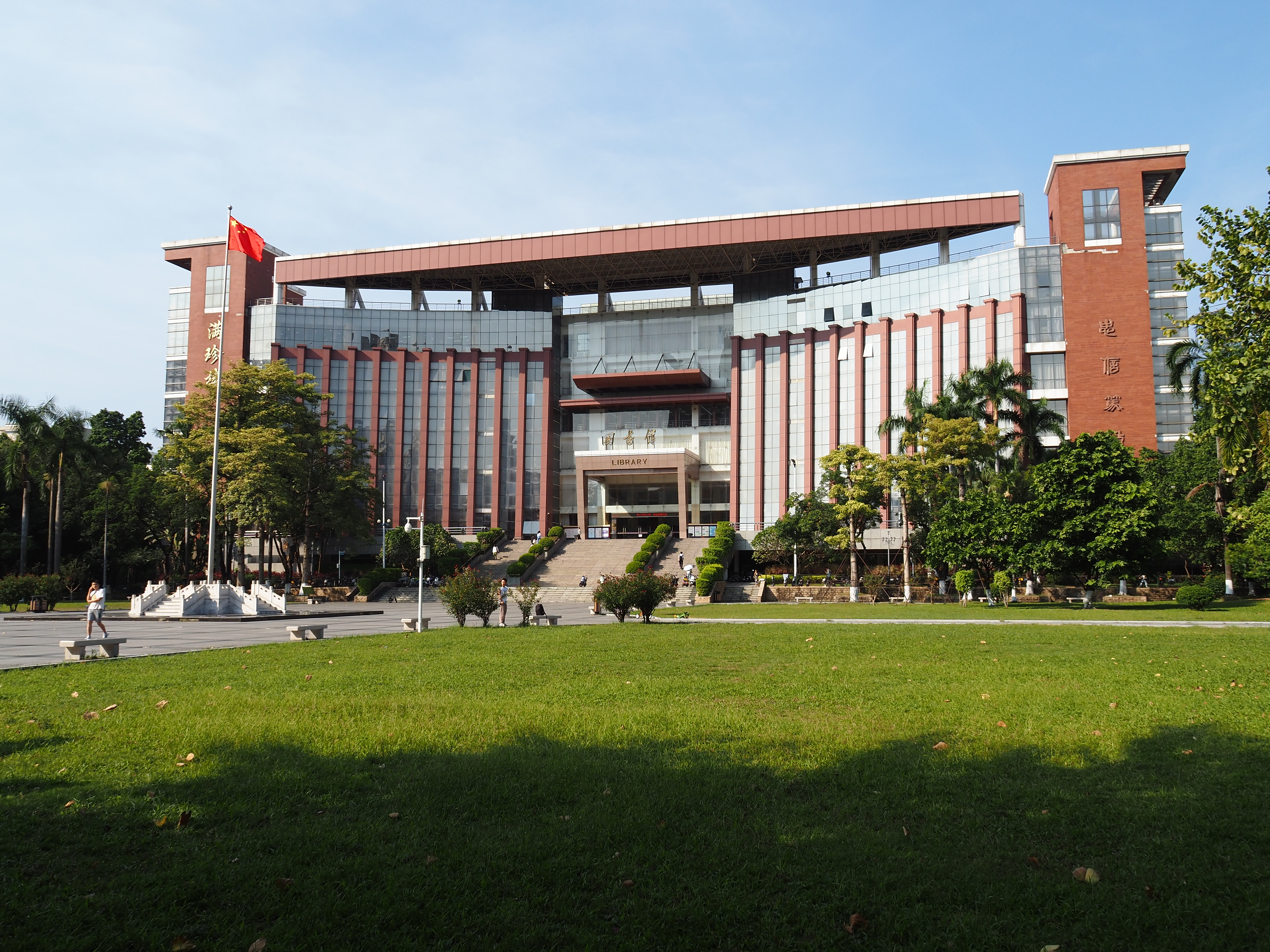
Library of Main Campus

The university has five campuses in China, and one campus in Japan:

- Main Campus, Tianhe District, Guangzhou
- College of Chinese language and culture, Tianhe District, Guangzhou
- Panyu Campus, Panyu, Guangzhou
- Zhuhai Campus, Xiangzhou District, Zhuhai
- Tourism College, Nanshan District, Shenzhen
- Japan Campus, Toshima, Tokyo

== Administration ==
Jinan University has 38 colleges, comprising 59 departments and offering 108 undergraduate major fields. Among the 55 departments, 43 offer master's degree programs and 19 offer Ph.D. degree-granting programs. There are 15 postdoctoral research stations, 182 research institutes and 77 labs in Jinan University.

The university has four national key disciplines, eight key disciplines of the Overseas Chinese Affairs Office of the State Council, 20 Guangdong Province Level-I key disciplines, and four Guangdong Province Level-II key disciplines. The university has a key research base of national humanity and social sciences, a teaching and research base for Chinese language and literature of the Education Ministry, a base for national university cultural quality education, a base of national base for teaching Chinese as a foreign language, an educational base for overseas Chinese education of the Overseas Chinese Affairs Office of the State Council, and a key research base of humanity and social science of Guangdong Province. The university has one national engineering center, 7 ministerial centers (engineering centers of the Ministry of Education) and provincial centers, and 11 key ministerial and provincial key laboratories.

There are 50,535 students in the university, including 10,767 graduates and 22,527 undergraduates. The number of overseas students, including foreign students, overseas Chinese students, students from Hong Kong, Macao and Taiwan, is 13,512.

The current CCP secretary is Sun Yu and the president is Xing Feng.

== Colleges and schools ==
- International School
- College of Liberal Arts
- College of Foreign Studies
- College of Journalism and Communication
- College of Arts
- College of Economics
- Management School
- School of Public Administration/School of Emergency Management
- Law School / Intellectual Property School
- School of International Studies/Academy of Overseas Chinese Studies
- College of Science and Engineering
- College of Information Science and Technology / College of Cyber Security
- College of Life Science and Technology
- School of Medicine
- First Clinical Medical School
- College of Pharmacy
- College of Chinese Language and Culture
- School of Humanities
- School of Translation Studies
- International Business School
- College of Electrical and Information Engineering
- Shenzhen Tourism College
- Education College
- School of Physical Education
- School of Environment
- School of Marxism
- Jinan University - University of Birmingham Joint Institute at Jinan University
- School of Mechanics and Construction Engineering
- College of Chemistry and Materials Science

=== International School ===
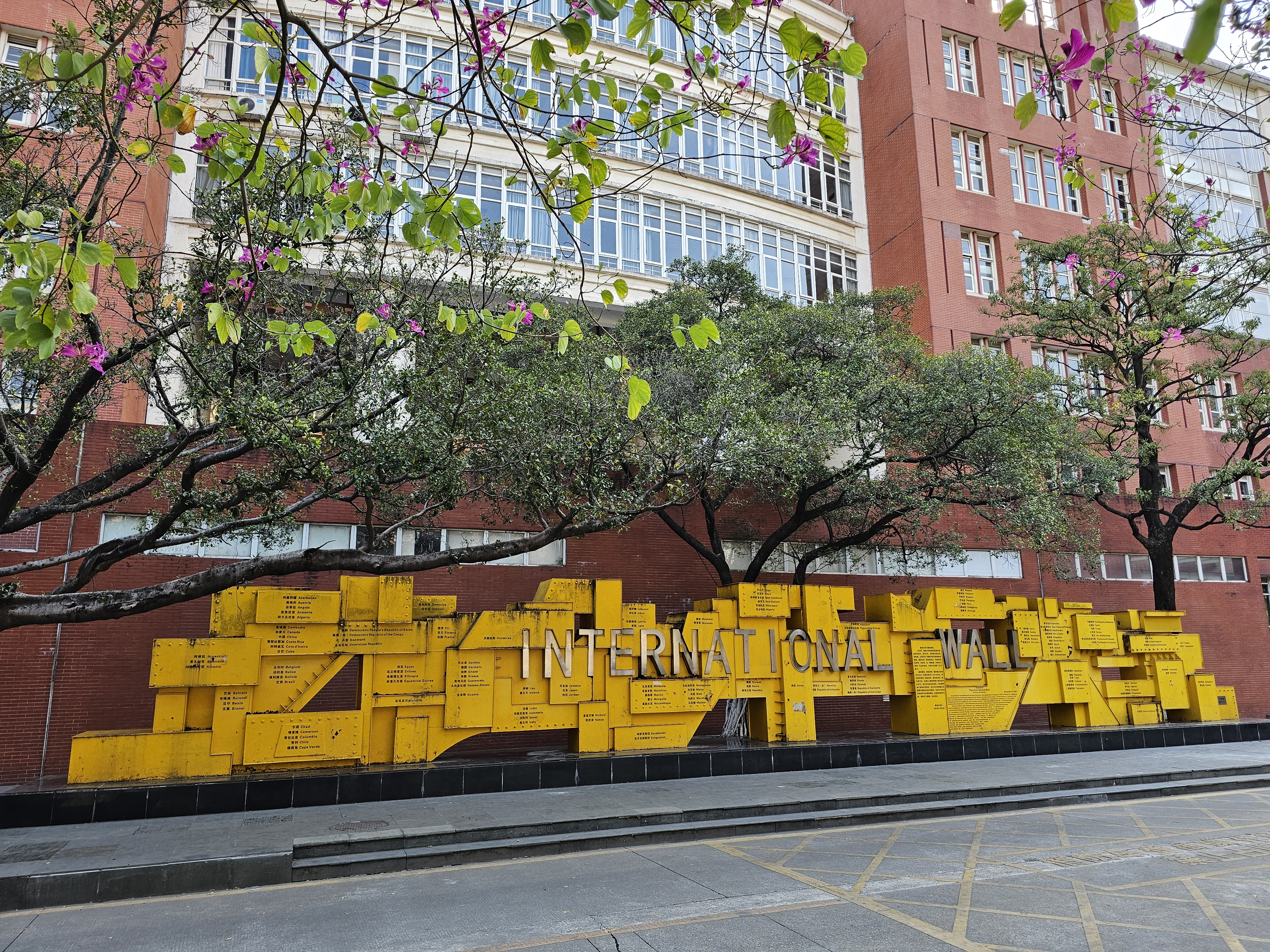
International Wall

The International School is a college which provides programs taught exclusively in English. The School was established to cater to the escalating needs of overseas Chinese and foreign students and selected high-caliber students from China. The undergraduate programs include International Journalism (IJ), Food Science and Engineering (FSE), Computer Science (CS), International Economics and Trade (IET), Clinical Medicine (CM), Accounting (CPA Canada), Pharmacy, Public Administration (ADM), Finance (FNC) and Bachelor of Medicine, Bachelor of Surgery (MBBS).

In order for students to gain various experiences worldwide, the International School developed several visiting and exchange programs with partner universities in the US, Canada, UK, Ireland, Germany, France, Australia, and New Zealand on a long- and short-term basis.

=== Management School ===
Drawing on JNU’s academic traditions and multidisciplinary expertise, the School of Management aims to develop management professionals through an education that integrates Chinese cultureknowledge, international perspectives and contemporary business practices.. In 2011, Jinan University MBA programs were granted international accreditation of AMBA.

=== College of Chinese Language and Culture ===
The college was conferred as the "National Base of Teaching Chinese as a Foreign Language" by the Education Ministry, and "Overseas Chinese Education Base" by Overseas Chinese Affairs Office of the State Council. The college has become the top college in South China offering the programs of teaching Chinese as a second or foreign language and overseas Chinese education.

The college consists of the Department of Teaching Chinese as a Second or Foreign Language, the Department of Overseas Chinese Education, the Department of Applied Linguistics, Pre-University Department, Correspondence Course Department, Overseas Chinese Education Researching Institute, Overseas Chinese Researching Center, and Internet & Educational Technology Center.

== Rankings and achievements ==
University rankings
BCUR National	Domestic	51
Wu Shulian National	Domestic	46
CUAA National	Alumni	38
QS National	General	36
THE National	General	32–37
QS Asia (Asia version)	General	=163
THE Asia (Asia version)	General	=128
ARWU World	Research	201–300
QS World	General	=483
THE World	General	501–550
USNWR World	General	=324

- One of the oldest universities in China and one of the Double First Class Universities in China
- The first university in China to recruit foreign students
- The first university in China to enroll students at both spring and autumn semesters
- The first university that pioneered the implementation of credit system in China
- The university with the largest number of overseas students
- The only university which have alumni in both Chinese and foreign state-level leaders in China

== Cooperation ==
Jinan University has been active at academic exchanges, and has established academic cooperation or academic exchange liaison with more than 180 universities and research institutes in Asia, the Americas, Europe, and Oceania. It partnered with City University, Malaysia to form an international think tank on Sino-Malaysian cooperation under the Belt and Road Initiative.

Now the university has 57 regional alumni associations all over the world.

== Controversies ==
=== Misuse of personal information for facilitating pro-Beijing candidate in 2019 Hong Kong local elections ===
Apple Daily Hong Kong reported that during 2019 Hong Kong local elections, they received complaints from Hong Kong students who were studying at Jinan University. In accordance with the complaints, many students from Hong Kong were requested to meet the academic staff or counselors separately. During the meetings, the university staff members were able to mention the constituency that the students belonged to. The students were requested to vote for the pro-Beijing candidates, while the university might provide free transportation for them.

=== False claims on Batanes ===
In 2026, the university published a controversial symposium paper which falsely claimed that Batanes was historically and geographically part of China. Academics globally criticized the paper for lack of academic merit and was condemned by the government of the Philippines. The university afterwards withdrew the paper and deleted it from its website. A month previously, the Chinese embassy in Manila posted on Facebook, stating that Batanes is the "northernmost province of the Philippines."

== Notable alumni ==
- Wu Xueqian, former Chinese Foreign Minister
- Li Lanqing, politician, former Vice Premier of China
- Jack C. K. Teng, educator, writer, politician, diplomat and Olympic pioneer
- Lee Kong Chian, businessman and philanthropist active in Malaya and Singapore from the 1930s to the 1960s
- Huang Binhong, art historian and literati painter
- Hu Zhiying, artist, educator, poet
- Cheng Yiu-tong, Hong Kong politician
- Zhang Tielin, actor and film director, dean of the art school of Jinan University
- Su Bingtian, track and field athlete who competes in sprints
- Lau Cheok Va, president of the Legislative Assembly of Macau
- Kwan Tsui Hang, member of the Legislative Assembly of Macau
- Ho Iat Seng, member of the Legislative Assembly of Macau
- Wong Kwok-hing, Hong Kong trade unionist and member of the Legislative Council of Hong Kong
- Shen Hongfei, writer, producer and food columnist
- Tan Qixiang, historical geographer, academician
- Hou Fusheng, petroleum engineer, academician

== See also ==
- Japan Campus of Foreign Universities
- Jinan University School of Medicine
