= Shimmer =

Shimmer may refer to:

- Shimmer (play), 1988, by John O'Keefe
- Shimmer (comics), a DC Comics super-villain
- Shimmer (Barnes novel), by Eric Barnes
- Shimmer (Schulman novel), by Sarah Schulman
- Shimmer Magazine, or Shimmerzine, a speculative fiction magazine
- "Shimmer" (Fuel song), 1998
- "Shimmer" (Notaker song), 2017
- "Shimmer" (Meghan Trainor song), 2026
- Shimmer (album), by Surgery, 1994
- Shimmer, a genie in the animated series Shimmer and Shine
- Shimmer Women Athletes, a female wrestling company
- "Shimmer", an episode of the first season of the TV series Smallville
- New Shimmer, a Saturday Night Live parody product notable for being "a floor wax and a dessert topping"
- Shimmer reverb, an audio effect

== See also ==
- Shim (disambiguation)
