= Hu Zhiying =

Chinese artist

- 胡志穎
- Born: November 12, 1959 (age 66); Ganzhou, Jiangxi Province, China
- Other name: Yuling
- Education: Jiangxi Normal University (1977–1981); Guangzhou Academy of Fine Arts (1987–1990); Jinan University (1999–2002) (Ph.D., 2002)
- Occupations: Artist; poet; professor
- Employers: Guangzhou Academy of Fine Arts (1990–1991); South China Normal University (1995–2020)
- Known for: Art, Contemporary Art, Literature
- Notable work: A Collection of Works by Hu Zhiying; Beyond the Chains of Illusion— Hu Zhiying's Paintings 1989–2009; Experience and Transcendence: Hu Zhiying's Art 1987–2017; On the Paramitality in Literature
- Awards: Won the Merit Award of the International Palm Art Award 2010, Leipzig, Germany; Won the Exposure Award, New York, USA (2015)

Hu Zhiying (Chinese: 胡志穎; pinyin: Hú zhìyǐng; born November 12, 1959) is a contemporary Chinese avant-garde artist and art educator. He works within the areas of painting, installation, video art, and conceptual art. His artworks are displayed worldwide, and he has taught painting and calligraphy at the Guangzhou Academy of Fine Arts and South China Normal University.

== Life and career ==
=== Early years ===
Hu was born in Ganzhou, Jiangxi. His ancestral home is Xiangyin County, Hunan. He was part of the "Class of 1977", the first group of Chinese students to take the National College Entrance Examination after its resumption in 1977. He graduated from the Art Department of Jiangxi Normal University. In 1987, he was admitted to the Guangzhou Academy of Fine Arts and studied in the Department of Chinese Painting. During his graduate studies, he joined the 1989 June 4th Democracy Movement.

=== About the Transiency of Art ===
In 1990, Hu's master's thesis About the Transiency of Art was labeled as "not in line with Marxist principles" and was rejected by Chi Ke, director of the Theory Teaching and Research Section of the Guangzhou Academy of Fine Arts. He was denied the chance to defend his thesis and eventually failed to acquire his diploma and master’s degree certificate. At that time, young teachers (including those of the Theory Teaching and Research Section), postgraduates who had finished their program, and those who were studying at Guangzhou Academy of Fine Arts jointly expressed their opinion to the Academy and higher-level authorities that academic freedom should be respected and learning should not be confused with administration. Wang Huangsheng, a professor at the Central Academy of Fine Arts, said: "Therefore, Hu Zhiying got himself into trouble with his brilliant paper About the Transiency of Art, and the mere presentation of his personal meditation was considered a challenge to the so-called authority."

The full text of About the Transiency of Art was published in Northern Art, journal of Tianjin Academy of Fine Arts in 2001. The title of his thesis was included in the Index of Theory of Plastic Art of 2001 by the Center of Data from Newspapers and Magazines of Renmin University of China.

=== Career ===
In 2002, Hu received his Ph.D. degree from the College of Liberal Arts of Jinan University with the thesis On the Paramitality in Literature. His poems are published in Chinese and Western Poetry, Survivors Poetry, etc. Hu Zhiying is also a dissident in mainland China. His articles criticizing the autocracy of the Chinese Communist Party are published in "Beijing Spring", "Huanghuagang Magazine", and Taiwan's Chinese Culture Monthly.

Hu teaches modern art and traditional Chinese calligraphy and painting at the College of Fine Arts of South China Normal University. In the 1990s, he was invited to exhibit his work in Europe. Since 2000, his works have mainly been exhibited in China and the United States. He was invited to collaborate with the Orchestra of St. Luke's (OSL) in New York City in 2020.

== Art style ==
=== Technology and media ===
Hu uses materials from Western art and Chinese traditional painting and arts and crafts, such as oils, acrylics, Chinese ink, varnish, silver, gold powder, etc. The lines, strokes, and images in Hu's paintings include the Eastern methods of connecting reality and fiction, conflicting forms, changing visual effects, virtual space forms, and free artistic skills, which dispel real shadows into virtual shadows.

Wang Huangsheng, an art critic and professor of the Central Academy of Fine Arts, said that Hu's paintings draw lessons from ancient Chinese arts and crafts materials and techniques such as lacquer and ink and wash. They contain images misappropriated from Chinese landscape paintings of the Song Dynasty; for example, the partial images of Ma Yuan's paintings are recombined in Hu's works.

=== Art form ===
According to Adam Donald, "Hu Zhiying brings together traditional Chinese art with the eclectic styles of the West. He combines traditional Chinese symbolism and landscape with the elements of the various styles of Western art". French art connoisseur and collector Didier Hirsch also expressed similar views in his article An Artist as Unconventional Personality: On Hu Zhiying. Some critics, including the American critic and curator Robin Peckham, pointed out that Hu's works surpassed the artistic characteristics of reality and reached a religious situation, believing that this is the reason why Hu's art and literature are difficult to interpret.

Didier Hirsch believes that Hu's style does not have the characteristics of the new trends of most Western and Chinese contemporary art, but is closer to those masters who left behind historical heritage.

In 2020, Hu was invited to participate in an art and music cooperation project with the New York Orchestra of St. Luke's (OSL). He interwove his paintings Angel IV and Mr. Don Quixote X with musician Eleanor Alberga's symphony The World of Dreams: Shining Gate of Morpheus, aiming to stimulate the audience's imagination by integrating visual art and music and allowing images and sounds to blend naturally.

=== Connotation and allegory ===
Critics, including Robin Peckham, generally believe that Hu's art does not belong to the popular art style in the current art criticism discourse system of realism criticism. Art critic and historian Gao Minglu called him "an independent meditator" in Freedom of a Lonely Passenger:

He has substituted the cultural theme of ultimate thinking for Bacon's original theme. Hu Zhiying's personal religious tendency leads to his reverence for Bacon's persevering pursuit, and at the same time Hu's inherent cultural conviction has determined the freedom and diversity of his choice of resources of image.

Since the 1990s, the aesthetic tendency of Hu's installation art has always been "Natural Aesthetics". "Nature" includes both traditional art and avant-garde art in the modernist period.

Paul Bridgewater, director of an art gallery in New York City, analyzed Hu's art and wrote:

The installation art of Hu Zhiying is a journey of process and discovery. From his installation work since the '90's where he illustrates an understanding of traditional Eastern arts, where reverence of nature and solitude are explored through a masterful fluidity of art form with complex elements. But as a thinking artist, Hu begins to explore the ephemera of Western Culture. Western motifs insinuate themselves into his work. Hu investigates the overbearing elements of Western Culture, where production and consumption become process of themselves replacing the value of the human consumer.

Hu's art has been described as having the spirit of Chinese culture in it, yet at the same time, presenting the original state of the world with disordered space and video code. His art aims to give an illusion of the misplacement or overlapping of time and space between the ancient and the present and to provide a sense of indirect presentation between the picture and its meaning.

== Exhibitions ==
=== Selected solo exhibitions ===
- Hu Zhiying, Galleria Piziarte (Teramo, Italy, 2008)
- Art Exhibition of Hu Zhiying, World Fine Art Gallery (New York, 2009)
- TRANSIENCY AND INDULGE – HU ZHIYING. HUANG SHAOYIN'S DRAWING, K Space (Beijing, 2009)
- Hu Zhiying’s Paintings (1989–2009), the Wall Art Museum (Beijing, 2010)
- The installation The Hans Christian Andersen's Fairy Tales (Museum of Modern Art, New York, 2016)
- Hu Zhiying’s Art (1987–2017) (53 Art Museum, Guangzhou, 2017)

=== Selected group exhibitions ===
==== 1990s ====
- Big-Tail Elephant, The United Art Exhibition (Guangzhou, 1992)
- Shanghai First International Fax Art Exhibition (Shanghai, 1996)
- China-Aktuelles aus 15 Ateliers (Munich, Germany, 1996)
- CHINA NOW! (Basel, Switzerland, 1996)

==== 2010s ====
- Window in the Wall：India and China – Imaginary Conversations, Pearl Lam Galleries (Shanghai, 2011)
- ART FRONTIER Contemporary Art Exhibition, Songzhuang Art Museum (Beijing, 2012)
- 55th Venice Biennale • Voice of the Unseen (Venice, Italy, 2013)
- The Exposure Award, Louvre Museum (Paris, 2015)
- Let There Be Books, video, the Museum of the Sichuan Fine Arts Institute (Chongqing, 2019)

Hu created and exhibited the following art installations:

- Diplomatic Language, etc., Dia:Beacon (New York, 2017)
- Beyond the Creation, UFO in the Room, Beautiful Lady Spies, Metropolitan Museum of Art (New York, 2018)
- Postcolonial Workshop, Metropolitan Museum of Art (New York, 2019)

==== 2020s ====
- Asian & African and Mediterranean International modern Art Exhibition, Qingdao Contemporary Art Museum (Qingdao, 2020)
- The World of Dreams: Shining Gate of Morpheus (music & art), Orchestra of St. Luke's (OSL) (New York, 2020)
- 1+1+...=X, installation and performance, Sponsors: New York City Artist Corps; New York Foundation for the Art; New York City Department of Cultural Affairs (New York, 2021)

== Publications ==
=== Portfolio ===
Major works published by Hu include:

- Hu, Zhiying (2011). Hu Zhiying zuo pin ji [A Collection of Works by Hu Zhiying] (in Chinese and English) (1st ed.). Fuzhou: Haifeng Publishing House. ISBN 9787551200295. OCLC 862563238.
- Bao, Dong (2010). Zai huan xiang suo lian de bi an : Hu Zhiying hui hua zuo pin, 1989–2009 [Beyond the Chains of Illusion— Hu Zhiying's Paintings 1989–2009] (in Chinese and English). Hong Kong: WorldCat. ISBN 978-988-18938-0-2. OCLC 728523572.
- Yang, Wei; Hu, Bin (2017). Ti yan yu chao yan Hu Zhiying yi shu (1987–2017) [Experience and transcendence : Hu Zhiying's art (1987–2017)] (in Chinese and English). Hong Kong: China Artists Publishing House. ISBN 978-988-78237-6-6. OCLC 1100122878.

=== Monographs ===
The following studies by Hu were published as monographs:

- Hu, Zhiying (2003). On the Paramitality in Literature (in Chinese) (1st ed.). Beijing: China Social Sciences Press. ISBN 7-5004-4164-9. OCLC 163817330.
- Hu, Zhiying (2003). The state of Western contemporary art (in Chinese) (1st ed.). Beijing: People's Fine Arts Publishing House. ISBN 7-102-02714-1. OCLC 213906305.

== Criticism ==
=== Art ===
According to Dr. Gao Ling, Hu's theme of art is generally regarded as unclear and obscure, and its aesthetic concepts are divorced from the appreciation habits and interest of the general public. Jia Fangzhou, a senior critic, pointed out that this may be connected with Hu Zhiying's internal needs, which shows that he has displayed a variety of styles. Since there are gaps in interpretations of Hu's art when reviewed from its cultural clues, artistic style, or artistic schema, grasping Hu Zhiying's art as a whole is often thought to be difficult by critics and art historians.

When analyzing Hu's art from the perspective of both its schema and concept, Yang Wei noted that they are not connected, and instead are almost completely separate. Wu Hong, critic and curator of the Songzhuang Contemporary Art Archive (China), thought that Hu's art should take into account the logical and coherent relationships among the images from different periods used in Hu's art, and create a bridge between his art and the public's interpretation of it.

The critic Bao Dong believed that the rationality of Hu's literary and artistic conception from Kant's philosophy is worthy of further discussion.

=== Literature ===
Hu's On the Paramitality in Literature is a work on the study of rhymes in Chinese classical literature, his doctoral dissertation. Professor Zhao Yifan of the Chinese Academy of Social Sciences mentioned in the preface of the book that On the Paramitality in Literature is an unfinished project, because it is an unseen, important, chaotic, and difficult subject, and its introduction of the Buddhist concept of "Pāramitā" into literary theory was questioned.

Professor Gao Minglu put forward different opinions on On the Paramitality in Literature. He believed the concept of the "other side," Pāramitā, is too easy to think of as the ultimate concern (Note: The ultimate concern of Western classical philosophy and theology points to the sacred world of divinity on the other side, so as to transcend the limited life of reality. Paul Tillich, an existentialist philosopher who has made great contributions in the field of philosophy and theology, is the representative figure who explores the ultimate concern.) (Note: The ultimate concern of Buddhism is to surpass the reality of life and reach the final state of "Tathatā" where everything is "Śūnyatā". The ultimate concern of ancient Chinese philosophy regards morality as noble and more important than life. The ultimate support of human spiritual world is to realize eternal and immortal life with the help of the textualization of spirit.) in Christian spirit and Western classical philosophy; at the same time, it is difficult to get rid of the traditional way of thinking of the binary opposition between "reality" and the "other side" in the West.
