= Shim (surname) =

Shim is a surname, and may refer to:

- Andrew Shim (born 1983), American-born English actor
- Meleana Shim (born 1991), American soccer midfielder
- Serena Shim (1985–2014), American journalist of Lebanese descent
- Shauna Shim (born 1979), American-born British actress

== See also ==
- Shim (Korean surname)
