= Eric Barnes (writer) =

American writer and publisher

- Born: February 28, 1968 (age 58)
- Education: Connecticut College (BA); Columbia University (MFA)
- Occupations: Writer; publisher
- Writing career
- Notable work: Shimmer (2009)
- Website: www.ericbarnes.net

Eric Barnes (born February 28, 1968) is an American writer and publisher. He is the author of the novels Above the Ether, from Arcade Publishing, The City Where We Once Lived, from Arcade Publishing, Shimmer, from Unbridled Books and Something Pretty, Something Beautiful, from Outpost19, as well as the author of numerous short stories, including stories published in The Literary Review, Prairie Schooner, The Northwest Review, Raritan and other publishers of short literary fiction.

Barnes' novel The City Where We Once Lived was a top 100 Kindle download from Amazon in the summer of 2020, peaking at #63 on August 10, 2020. His novel Above the Ether was a top 200 Kindle download that summer, reaching #193.

The novel The City Where We Once Lived has led to Barnes' work being cited as contributing to the national conversation on climate change.

Barnes' short story "Something Pretty, Something Beautiful" was selected for inclusion in Best American Mystery Stories 2011, a series edited by Otto Penzler.

Barnes is the CEO and first Executive Editor of The Daily Memphian, an online news site in Memphis started in September 2018. Barnes is also the publisher of The Daily News, as well as The West Tennessee News, The Nashville Ledger, The Knoxville Ledger, and The Hamilton County Herald.

Since 2010, Barnes has hosted the weekly news program Behind the Headlines on local Public Television, WKNO. The show, Behind the Headlines, covers local stories, including stories about politics, business and the public interest.

Barnes received his BA from Connecticut College and his MFA from Columbia University. He was formerly a reporter and editor in Connecticut and New York City and, before that, worked in Kenai, Alaska. He grew up in Tacoma, Washington. He lives in Memphis.

== Novels – synopsis and reviews ==
Barnes has written the novel The City Where We Once Lived (Arcade Publishing, March 2018, ISBN 978-1-62872-883-5). Emily St. John Mandel said of the novel, "Barnes's new novel is a rare and truly original work: a hard-edged fable, tender and unflinching, in which a man's descent and renewal is mirrored by his city. An eerie, beautifully written, and profoundly humane book." The City Where We Once Lived was a top 100 Kindle download from Amazon in the summer of 2020, peaking at #63 on August 10, 2020.

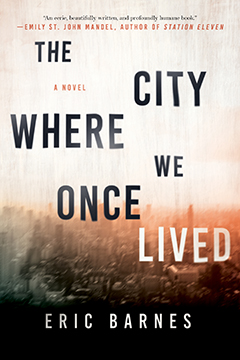

Barnes has written the novel Above the Ether (Arcade Publishing, June 2019, ISBN 978-1628729986). Booklist said of the novel, “Barnes’ spare and chilling prose flows from one horrific scene to another without, surprisingly, alienating his readers, perhaps because the heart of his narrative ultimately reveals an abiding faith in the power of human compassion. A first-rate apocalyptic page-turner.” Above the Ether was a top 200 Kindle download in 2020, reaching #193 on May 9, 2020.

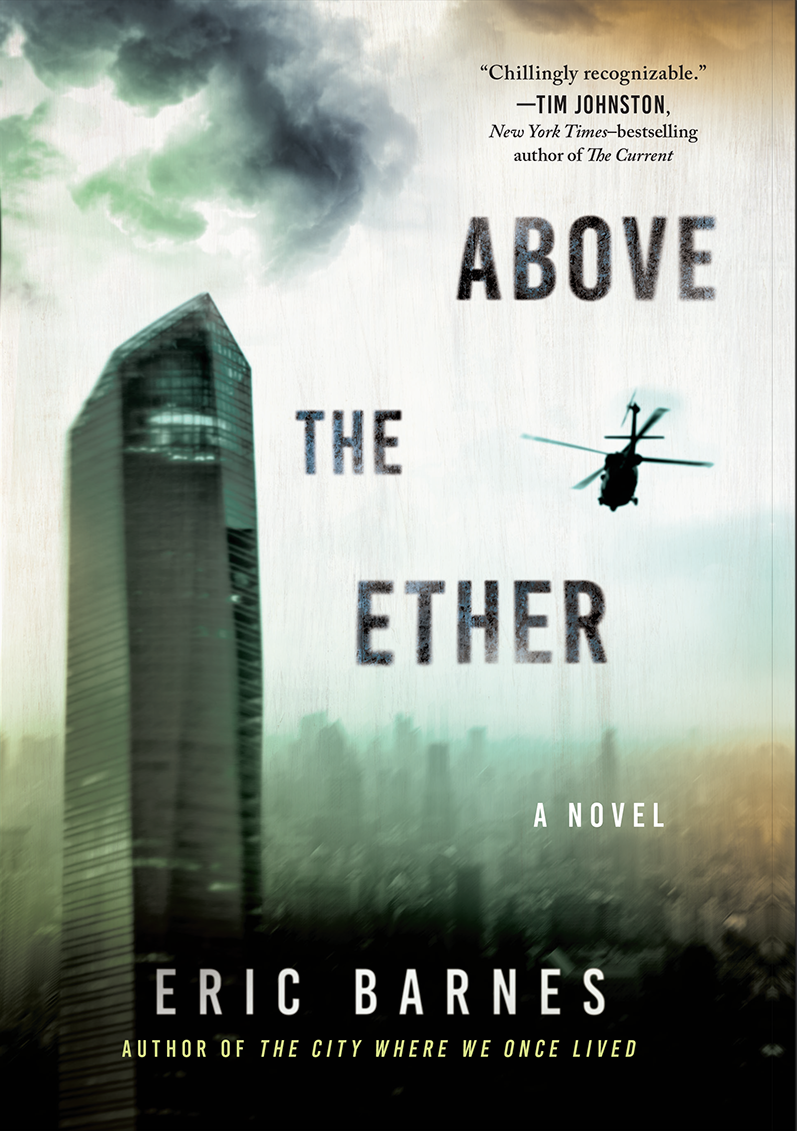

He has also written the novel Something Pretty, Something Beautiful (Outpost19 June 2013, ISBN 978-1937402525). Benjamin Whitmer wrote of the book, "Elegantly constructed and lovingly, tenderly, savagely written... the most harrowing portrait of American boys careening into manhood that I've ever read. And the truest."

Barnes has written the novel Shimmer (Unbridled Books, July 2009, ISBN 1-932961-67-4). A book about CEO Robbie Case, whose high tech company is built on a lie, Shimmer follows Robbie as he attempts to unwind the lie he has created. The fictional company, Core Communications, is a provider of high end networking services to mainframe computers. Along with his partner and cousin, Robbie has created an elaborate system that supposedly allows mainframe computers to communicate at impossibly fast speeds. However, the system does not work. It is actually built on a technical and financial Ponzi scheme that will fail if the company ever stops expanding.

Reviews of Shimmer have said, "Case's slow but accelerating downward spiral drives the narrative.... The corporate intrigue should hook anyone fascinated by the collapse of Wall Street and the crimes of Bernie Madoff." Another reviewer said, "I haven't been able to get the people in the book out of my head.... Beautifully written, quiet and intense, Shimmer was absolutely riveting." Another reviewer said of Shimmer, "The book moves at a breathtaking pace, but I was purposely slowing my reading to enjoy both the writing and the structure of the book. Shimmer is beautiful in the way that a collapsing building is; more beautiful, because throughout it you can cling to the hope that the building will somehow put itself back together."

== Short stories ==
Barnes has published a number of short stories. They include:

- "Something Pretty, Something Beautiful," Best American Mystery Stories 2011
- "Something Pretty, Something Beautiful," Prairie Schooner
- "All I Can See," Other Voices
- "And We Would Drive," The Northwest Review
- "Applewhite," The Literary Review
- "The Arsons," The Louisville Review
- "Auntie Gail and Uncle Dan," Press
- "Captain Marvel," Pearl
- "Friday Afternoon," Arkansas Review/Kansas Quarterly
- "Dreams Where I Can Fly," Raritan
- "Prima della fine," l'Internazionale (an Italian translation of "Dreams Where I Can Fly")
- "The Huts," The Greensboro Review
- "Lull, Pattern and Pure," 34th Parallel
- "Macramé Today," North Atlantic Review
- "Perfection," The Literary Review
- "Powdered Milk," Washington Square Review
- "Santa Claus Goes Hunting In the Off-Season," HobartPulp
- "Slower," The Portland Review
- "Someone Else Entirely," Quarterly West
- "Stories About Them," Crazyhorse
- "Swimming," The Portland Review
- "Toward the Sky," Pacific Review

== Newspapers and publishing ==
Barnes is the CEO and first Executive Editor of The Daily Memphian, an online news site in Memphis, Tennessee. He is also Publisher & CEO of The Daily News (Memphis), which publishes news of business and politics in Memphis, as well as The Nashville Ledger, The Knoxville Ledger and The Hamilton County Herald.. The Daily News also publishes a weekly edition, The West Tennessee News, operates an extensive public records database on its Web site, and operates Chandler Reports, a provider of real estate information.
