= Hou Fusheng =

Chinese petroleum and chemical engineer

Hou Fusheng (Chinese: 侯芙生; 28 November 1923 – 31 October 2018) was a Chinese petroleum and chemical engineer. He served as deputy chief engineer of Sinopec and was an academician of the Chinese Academy of Engineering.

== Biography ==
Hou was born 28 November 1923 in Wuxi, Jiangsu, China, and attended school in nearby Shanghai. In 1941, when he was in the 12th grade, the Pacific War broke out and the Japanese occupied the Shanghai International Settlement. Unwilling to live under Japanese rule, he left Shanghai for the mountainous region of Fujian. The train he took was bombed by the Japanese in western Zhejiang, and he had to walk the rest of the way to Fujian. In 1943, he was admitted by National Jinan University, which had relocated from Shanghai to Jianyang, Fujian because of the war.

After graduating in 1947 from Jinan University with a B.Sc. degree in chemistry, he spent most of his career in the petroleum industry. He participated in many major projects and served as chief engineer of the Northeast No. 10 Petroleum Works, chief engineer of the Production Department of the Ministry of Petroleum, and deputy chief engineer of the Chinese petroleum giant Sinopec.

He published more than 80 research articles and four books. He was elected an academician of the Chinese Academy of Engineering in 1995.

Hou died on 31 October 2018, at the age of 94.
