= Danzhutou =

Village in Shenzhen, China

Coordinates: 22°37′14″N 114°08′59″E

Danzhutou (丹竹头; Hakka: Tan Tsuk Theu) is a village in Buji, Longgang District, Shenzhen, Guangdong Province, China.

== Demographics ==
The original village population which was established over 333 years ago in 2016 during the Qing Dynasty consisted of approximately 500 people of the Hakka dialect group. The variant of Hakka spoken is called Sin On. The inhabitants use 4 surnames: Shen (沈; Hakka: Shim), 80%), Ling (凌), Luo (罗) and Zhang (张).

Later village filled with low rise buildings and a large immigrant population.

== Economy ==
The village has prospered, due to its proximity to Shenzhen, just outside the Shenzhen Economic Zone. It is surrounded by factory complexes. The original villagers became wealthy landlords. Even the poorest villager has shelter. The immigrant population runs most of the businesses, and rents housing.

== See also ==
- Danzhutou Station, Longgang Line, Shenzhen Metro
- 沈 The Progenitor of the 沈 lineage is 沈世昌.
- 凌
- 罗
- 张
