= Sim So-myung =

South Korean esports and poker player (born 1984)

s.s.m~[SiLvEr]

Personal information
- Born: 27 September 1984 (age 42)

Career information
- Game: StarCraft
- Role(s): Video game player Poker player
- Game Information
- Platform: PC
- Genre: Real-time strategy

- Sim So-myung
- Hangul: 심소명
- RR: Sim Somyeong
- MR: Sim Somyŏng

Somyung "Silver" Sim (born September 27, 1984), known by the pseudonym s.s.m~[SiLvEr] is one of the most successful player of the real-time strategy computer game StarCraft. Also known to be a poker player, he has made the final table of the APPT Macau 2008 (Asia Pacific Poker Tour).

== Accomplishments ==
- 2003.01 Gembc KTF StarCraft League 1st Place
- 2004.08 iTV Ranking Event 3rd place
- 2004.10 Sky Pro-league 2nd Round MVP
- 2006.08 Sky Pro-league 1st Round MVP
- 2006.11 Pringles MBCGame StarCraft League 2nd Place
- 2007.09 Official Ambassador of Game Olympiad, Suwon City
- 2008 APPT Macau 9th Place- $22,692
