= Shimmer (Barnes novel) =

Novel by Eric Barnes

Shimmer is a novel by Eric Barnes, published by Unbridled Books.

== Synopsis ==
Barnes has written the novel Shimmer (Unbridled Books, July 2009, ISBN 1-932961-67-4). A book about CEO Robbie Case, whose high tech company is built on a lie, Shimmer follows Robbie as he attempts to unwind the lie he has created. The fictional company, Core Communications, is a provider of high end networking services to mainframe computers. Along with his partner and cousin, Robbie has created an elaborate system that supposedly allows mainframe computers to communicate at impossibly fast speeds. However, the system does not work. It is actually built on a technical and financial Ponzi scheme that will fail if the company ever stops expanding.

== Reviews of Shimmer ==
"Case's slow but accelerating downward spiral drives the narrative.... The corporate intrigue should hook anyone fascinated by the collapse of Wall Street and the crimes of Bernie Madoff."—Publishers Weekly

"...a sheen of elegance and terror; one is reminded, in Barnes' language and locution, of Don DeLillo's scalpel-sharp delineation of American corporate culture and paranoia, and of David Foster Wallace's penetration into the heart of the relationship between human consciousness and rapidly changing technologies."—Fredric Koeppel, The Commercial Appeal

"I haven’t been able to get the people in the book out of my head.... Beautifully written, quiet and intense, Shimmer was absolutely riveting."

"The book moves at a breathtaking pace, but I was purposely slowing my reading to enjoy both the writing and the structure of the book. Shimmer is beautiful in the way that a collapsing building is; more beautiful, because throughout it you can cling to the hope that the building will somehow put itself back together."

"Robbie is one of those engagingly conflicted heroes who comes along from time to time, an essentially good man who knowingly perpetrated a swindle of epic proportions and who will now do whatever it takes to minimize the damage."—Booklist

"[T]his page turner isn't for techno geeks only. Bottom Line: Even the computer challenged reader will be wired into the intrigue."—Wanda McKinney, Southern Living

"[A] remarkable character study, unflinchingly probing the psyche of its flawed but compelling protagonist. [A]n insightful and incisive rendering of the kind of high-tech confidence man that it's impossible not to recognize. [A]s with … Delillo and Gibson, the technology, though high concept, is not the main subject of Barnes’ interest, except in the ways it transforms the characters. Eric Barnesis completely fearless." -- Benjamin Whitmer, INDenverTimes

"The real story of Shimmer is the interaction between the people of Core. An ode to good people who do bad things and who genuinely believe it's not always about the money. Sometimes it's personal."—Chris Scott, Chapter 16

"Shimmer is a 21st century thriller about technology and morality.... Shimmer's origins owe more to the dot-com bust."—Rich Fisher, Studio Tulsa, Tulsa Public Radio
