= Shim Bo-seon =

South Korean poet and university professor

- Hangul: 심보선
- Hanja: 沈甫宣
- RR: Sim Boseon
- MR: Sim Posŏn

Shim Bo-Seon (Korean: 심보선, born 1970) is a South Korean poet and university professor.

== Biography ==
He was born 1970 in Seoul, graduated from Seoul National University in Sociology, and then completed a master's degree at the same university. Afterwards he earned a doctorate degree in sociology at Columbia's graduate school. He debuted in 1994 as his poem "Punggyeong" (풍경 Landscape) won the Chosun Ilbo Annual Spring Literary Contest Award. With his first poetry collection, Fifteen Seconds Without Sorrow (슬픔이 없는 십오 초) (Moonji Publishing, 2008), which was published 14 years after his literary debut, he received widespread adoration from the public and heated attention from the literary circle. He is also active in the administrative area of cultural arts, and has also raised criticism on Shin Kyung-sook's plagiarism scandal in 2015. In 2009 he was awarded the 16th Kim Junseong Literature Prize, and the 11th Nojak Literature Prize. He is currently serving as an editor for F, a liberal arts magazine, and is also working as a professor of arts and cultural management at the Kyung Hee Cyber University.

== Writing ==
Shim Bo-Seon's poetry offers readers clairvoyance that closely examines reality, and an in-depth experience that goes right through the middle of that reality, while also offering the strength and humor of objectivity that lays down what can be called a poetic avenue right there. His poetry, in expressing the urban depression amidst modern capitalism, uniquely depicts the loneliness within the late capitalist society as well as the philosophical observation on it.

Having studied culture and arts sociology in university, he takes the doubts and distress that are unavoidable in a capitalist society, and uses them as subject matter for everyday life. He recognizes the ruins of the world that he belongs to, and displays sensitive self-consciousness as an artist that must survive in such a world. In his second poetry collection, Someone Always in the Corner of My Eye (눈앞에 없는 사람) (Moonji Publishing, 2011), he takes his self-consciousness as an artist to dramatic ends. However, there is the characteristics that it is not limited by existing loneliness and depression, and searches for a possibility that can overcome the exterior of art. To the poet, such possibility is implicated by the word 'love'. The poet becomes engrossed in not labor, which makes things of use, but in activities of love, which makes things of no use. Therefore, he stresses that what we need is not the desolate loneliness of art, but being together with others, and changing ourselves through disorder and companionship not silence.

== Works ==
=== Poetry collections ===
- Fifteen Seconds Without Sorrow (슬픔이 없는 십오 초) (Moonji Publishing, 2008)
- Someone Always in the Corner of My Eye (눈앞에 없는 사람) (Moonji publishing, 2011)

=== Essay Collection ===
- Geu-eullin yesul (그을린 예술 Burnt art) (Minumsa, 2013)

=== Works in Translation ===
- Fifteen Seconds Without Sorrow (English)
- Someone Always in the Corner of My Eye (English)

== Awards ==
- 2009 16th Kim Junseong Literature Prize
- 2016 11th Nojak Literature Prize
