= Shim (musician) =

Israeli musical artist

SHIM
- Born: Shimrit Ovadia; July 23, 1983 (age 42)
- Origin: Tel Aviv, Israel
- Genres: Folk, Americana, rock, western-rock
- Occupation(s): Singer-songwriter, producer
- Instrument(s): Vocals, guitars, harmonica, piano
- Years active: 2008–present
- Labels: Indie
- Website: www.shim-music.com

SHIM (born Shimrit Ovadia, Hebrew: שמרית עובדיה; born July 23, 1983) is an independent Israeli singer-songwriter, musician and artist which has been internationally and domestically active since 2008.

Amongst multiple shows and concerts, her artistic engagements include the Liverpool folk scene, performances in Israel with high involvement in regards to the Tel Aviv musical performance scene, 2012 Reeperbahn festival in Germany, various other festivals and special events. A frequent participant in local media such as show and concerts coverages. Her current band consists of a classical formation of lead, rhythm, bass guitars and drums with a routine presence of keyboard, accordion, harmonica and from time to time other instruments such as banjo and strings.

Shim's album debut and related activities gained media coverage. Notable coverage was reported by Time Out, BalconyTV, Israel's popular news website Ynet, Walla!, and acclaimed Israeli radio presenter Yoav Kutner.

She has written, composed and produced all of her music.

== Early life ==
SHIM grew up to a family of four siblings in the south Tel Aviv area of Kfar Shalem. She took an almost natural penchant for Music and started performing to friends and family at a very young age. SHIM quickly began writing songs, discovered her own unique sound and participated in different projects both as a singer and guitarist/arranger.

== Education ==
At her teenage years, she took up a full musical array of studies in the "Neve Eliezer" musical conservatorium in Tel Aviv. These studies included participation in a guitar ensemble, musical theory studies, classical/bass/electrical guitar classes and vocal classes.

Following a personal trip to the UK and Ireland she enrolled for a BA (Honours) music degree in LIPA (Liverpool Institute of Performing Arts) a highly appreciated school of arts founded by Sir Paul McCartney which is also one of SHIM's major musical idols and a major artistic source of inspiration.

== Discography ==
- EP – A self-titled/self-produced, six track debut EP recorded in Liverpool, England was released in late 2010.
- Album – "Riverbound" A first full-length album containing nine original tracks was released in November 2013.
- Additional Recordings – In 2013, SHIM took part in "kol2and5" (קול שני וחמישי) the Israeli equivalent to American Daytrotter in which she recorded three original live tracks on reel-to-reel tape.

== Musical cooperation ==
Liverpool's local musician Keith Xander participated in the recording of "SHIM" (EP). During November 2013, a viral campaign was held to promote the debut of Riverbound. Israeli indie-folk artist Uzi Ramirez, Ran Nir (Asaf Avidan & the Mojos, "LFNT") and Israeli bluegrass group "Jacks of Diamond" cooperated with SHIM to release acoustic versions to a selection of the album's songs.

== Reception ==
- David Pearl from TELAVIVIAN online magazine commented that SHIM "possesses a deep, soothing voice and her songs characterized by catchy yet powerful melodies, and a warm, rootsy sound."
- Israeli online magazine Mirpeset – "It seems that there is no such thing as too much folk music in the world and there is always room for one more folk artist. There is something about this genre which is so naked and exposed that the artist's personality reveals itself to you in its full glory. That's the story with SHIM (Shimrit Ovadia), which instantly excites you in an almost irritating ease.".
- Tel Aviv Mekomon newspaper wrote '"A very talented musician".
- music-page.co.il has stated "Musically, Riverbound is not an exceptionally complex folk-rock song. However, it has so much emotion beyond its basic form and thus proves that even if it is not that complex that doesn't mean the song couldn't touch all the right spots to excite"
