= Sim Sang-dae =

South Korean writer

Sim Sang-dae (born 1960) is a South Korean writer. He began his literary career when he published "Myosachong" (묘사총 A Description), "Mukhoreul aneunga" (묵호를 아는가 Do You Know Mukho), and "Suchaehwa gamsang" (수채화 감상 Looking at Watercolor Paintings), all at the same time on Korea's quarterly publication, World Literature. In the same year, he published his first collection, Mukhoreul aneunga (묵호를 아는가 Do You Know Mukho), and later published more collections such as Myeongokheon (명옥헌) and Tteollim (떨림 The Trembling). After 2006 he took a hiatus, and in 2013 he returned to the literary world with the web novel Nappeun bom (나쁜 봄 Bad Spring) published on Naver, which happens to be his first novel. He has won the 46th Hyundae Literary Award, and the 6th Kim Yujung Literary Award.

== Life ==
Sim Sang-dae was born in 1960 Gangneung, Gangwondo. He graduated from Gangneung Jeil High School and Korea University in archaeology & art history. As a peculiar background in his career, he had changed his pen name twice. At first, he had used his real name ‘Sim Sang-dae’, but as he published his serial story Tteollim (떨림 The Trembling) in 2000, he changed his pen name to ‘Marsyas Sim’. He has said that this was to show his aspiration to ‘be bold in front of art, just like the artist in the legend who attempted to contest Apollo, the son of Zeus, in the arts’. Later, because it sounded like his name ‘Sang-dae’, he added the name ‘Sunday’, changing it again to ‘Sunday Marsyas Sim’. From the time of publishing Nappeun bom (나쁜 봄 Bad Spring), he is using his real name again.

== Writing ==
Sim Sang-dae's most distinguished characteristic is his ability to balance aesthetic stance and narrative completion. From his three debut works, "Myosachong" (묘사총 A Description), "Mukhoreul aneunga" (묵호를 아는가 Do You Know Mukho), and "Suchaehwa gamsang" (수채화 감상 Looking at Watercolor Paintings), he is said to have "shown very different looks in terms of the actual story in each work, despite all of them showing excellent sense of language and technical skill". In his first collection that was published in 1990, Mukhoreul aneunga (묵호를 아는가 Do You Know Mukho), there are 11 stories that each has a different color. These are such as "Myosachong" (묘사총 A Description) and "Gang" (강 The River), which have strong aestheticism; "Huibokssiui Budongsan" (희복씨의 부동산 The Real Estate of Miss Huibok) and "Yagobui oechul" (야곱의 외출 Jacob's Outing), which are categorized under realism; "Mukhoreul aneunga" (묵호를 아는가 Do You Know Mukho), which has a lyrical tone; "Mondeuriangwa roseukoreul wihan guseong" (몬드리안과 로스코를 위한 구성 The Composition for Mondrian and Roscoe), which shows experimental form and composition; and "Yangpungjeon" (양풍전), which bases itself on deep exploration of the story itself. For that, critic Kang Sang-hui, who had given commentary on Sim Sang-dae's second collection Myeongokheon (명옥헌), has called Sim Sang-dae as the "storytelling aestheticist."

Sim Sang-dae's works either have different tones from one another, or there are cases where in one work there is a coexistence of elements of different tones. However, it is not that there isn't an element that permeates through all of his works. In general, he portrays a longing for life where people truly bond with each other, where people live with dignity, a world before civilization and the order of reason, where the vigorous and wild breath of life unique to humans still live and breathe. And he has continued this toward works such as the serial Tteollim (떨림 The Trembling), which deals with indulgence of wild sexuality, or Nappeun bom (나쁜 봄 Bad Spring), which discusses the problems of a collective, where everyone shares the same thought and mind.

== Works ==
- Nappeun bom (나쁜 봄 Bad Spring), 2014.
- Simmiju-uija (심미주의자 The Aestheticist), 2005.
- Baljji (발찌 The Ankle Bracelet), 2002.
- Myeongokheon (명옥헌), 2001.
- Tteollim (떨림 The Trembling), 2000.
- Neukdaewaui inteobyu (늑대와의 인터뷰 The Interview With the Wolf), 1999.
- Saranggwa insaenge gwanhan yeodeol pyeonui soseol (사랑과 인생에 관한 여덟 편의 소설 Eight Stories on Love and Life), 1998.
- Mukhoreul aneunga (묵호를 아는가 Do You Know Mukho), 1990.

== Awards ==
- HMS (Hahn Moo-Sook) Literary Prize, 2016.
- Kim Yujung Literary Award, 2012.
- Hyundae Literary Award, 2001.
