= Shim Sang-ho =

South Korean businessman

- Born: 1959 (age 66–67)
- Known for: President of Digital Magic Korea

Korean name
- Hangul: 심상호
- Hanja: 沈相昊
- RR: Sim Sangho
- MR: Sim Sangho

Shim Sang-ho (Korean: 심상호; Hanja: 沈相昊) is a South Korean businessman. He served as an elected volunteer member of the Asia-Pacific Regional Scout Committee of the World Organization of the Scout Movement (WOSM) from 2009 to 2015, chairperson of the Young Adult Members Group.
