= Shen Dingyi =

Chinese revolutionary

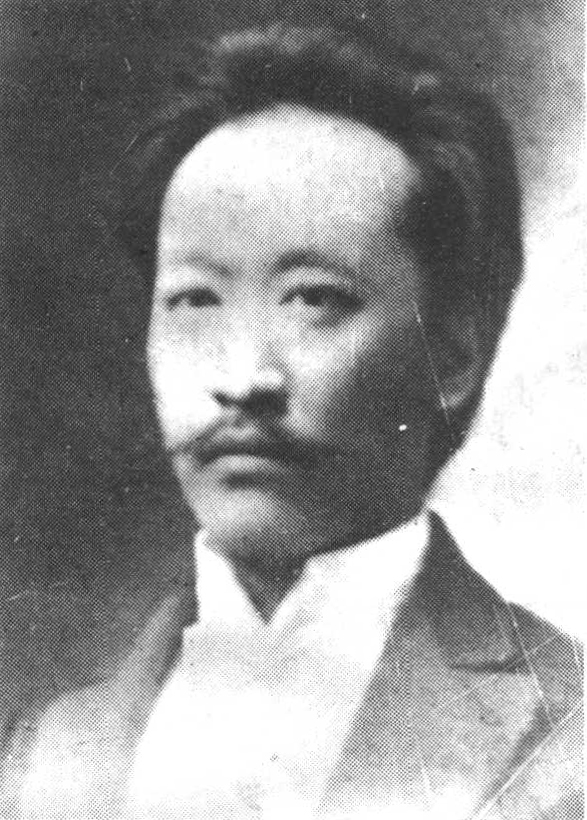
Shen Dingyi

Shen Dingyi (Chinese: 沈定一; pinyin: Shěn Dìngyī; 1883 – August 1928); born in Yaqian (Xiaoshan), a 1920s-era Chinese revolutionary and intellectual who belonged to both the Kuomintang and the Chinese Communist Party. In 1921, in his home village of Yaqian (Zhejiang province), he organized hundreds of thousands peasants in a reformist association fighting for a 30% cut in land allowance. Some sinologists regard him as one of the forerunners of Mao Zedong. An undisciplined member of the Kuomintang, he was mysteriously assassinated in 1928.
