= Shen Yongping =

Chinese filmmaker (born 1980)

Shen Yongping (Chinese: 沈勇平; born November 23, 1980) is a Chinese filmmaker who was arrested and imprisoned after making a documentary about the Chinese Constitution. Shen's documentary, entitled "A Hundred Years of Constitutionalism", was posted online and downloaded for free, and hundreds of DVDs were provided for free to people who contribute money to the film's production.

Shen was detained in April 2014 and jailed in Chaoyang District, Beijing, and was formally arrested on June 4. The Beijing Bureau of Press, Publication, Radio, Film and Television discovered 4,000 copies of Shen's documentary in his apartment, which officials said were illegal publications. In his indictment, prosecutors argued Shen had a "weak understanding of the rule of law" when he released the film, and that he "disrupted the market order in a particularly serious manner".

After a Beijing district court hearing that began on December 12, 2014, Shen was sentenced to one year in prison for illegal business activities. His attorney has disputed the allegation, saying Shen did not make the film for profit, and claims he will appeal the decision. Shen's supporters suggest his arrest was a thinly veiled punishment for his film's criticism of the Chinese Communist Party (CCP)'s failure to uphold the country's constitution.

Shen's arrest and conviction is one of a series of examples of general secretary of the CCP Xi Jinping taking a hard line against protestors, dissenters and artists critical of the CCP. Shen was counted by the Committee to Protect Journalists as one of 44 journalists arrested in China in 2014, the most from any country that year.

== See also ==
- List of Chinese dissidents
