= Shen Hongfei =

Chinese food writer

Shen Hongfei (Chinese: 沈宏非; pinyin: Shěn Hóngfēi) (born 1962 in Shanghai) is a writer, producer and food columnist in China.

Shen's commentary on food has appeared in newspapers, magazines, and television programmes in China.

== Life ==
He studied journalism in Jinan University in the late 1970s and graduated in 1984.

== Column ==
Shen has been a food critic and columnist for Southern Weekly in 2002. He also wrote a column "Ideological Work" for one of the most prominent magazines in China, Sanlian Life Magazine.
