= Cheongsong County =

Coordinates: 36°26′N 129°03′E

Cheongsong
- County
- Panoramic view of Cheongsong-eup

- Flag

- Location in South Korea
- Country: South Korea
- Region: Yeongnam
- Administrative divisions: 1 eup, 7 myeon

Area
  - Total: 842.45 km^{2} (325.27 sq mi)

Population
  - Total: 31,313
  - Density: 37.2/km^{2} (96/sq mi)
  - Dialect: Gyeongsang

Korean name
- Hangul: 청송군
- Hanja: 靑松郡
- RR: Cheongsong-gun
- MR: Ch'ŏngsong-gun

Cheongsong County (Korean: 청송군) is a county in North Gyeongsang Province, South Korea.

== Administrative divisions ==
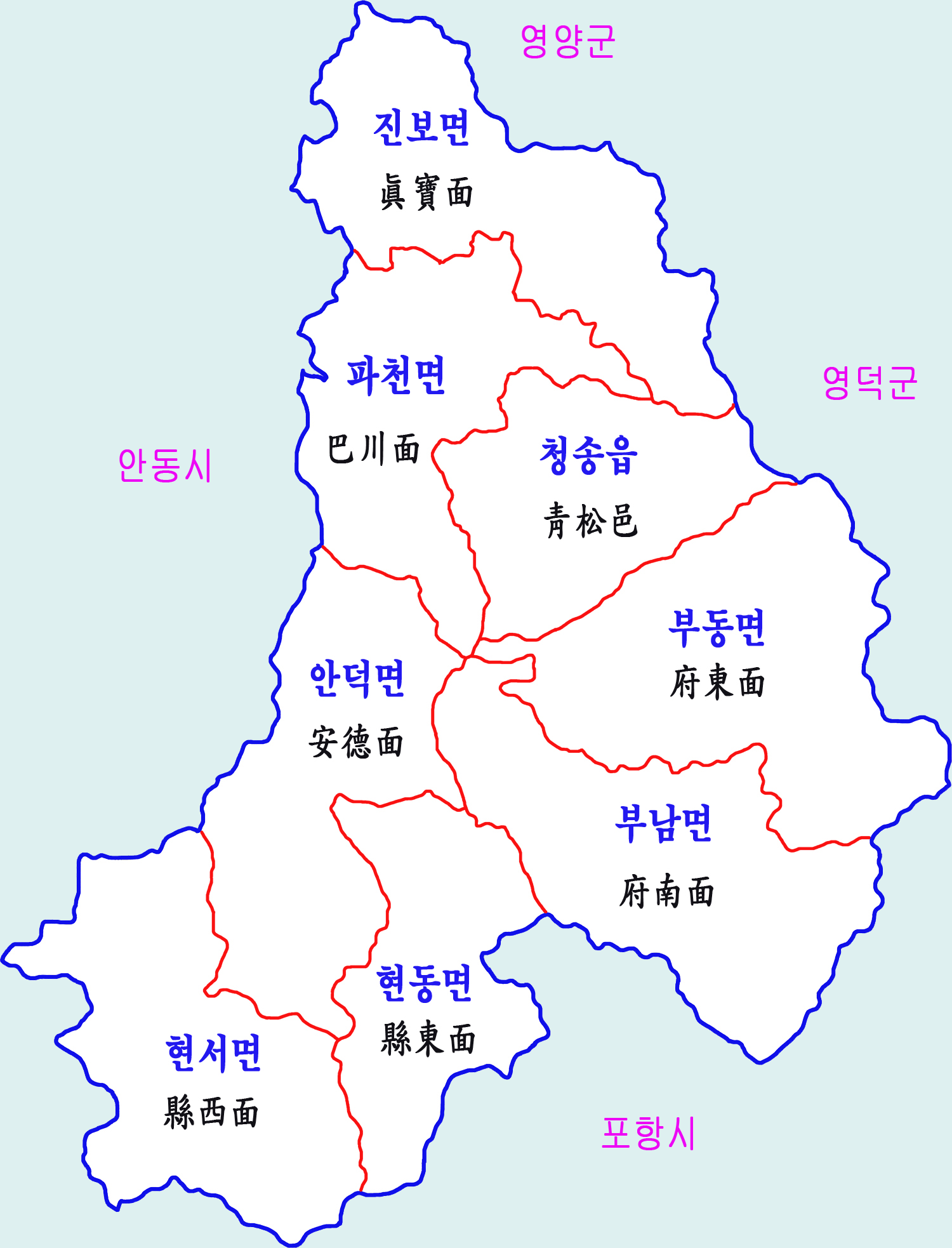
Map of Cheongsong in Korean

Cheongsong is divided into 1 eup and 7 myeon.

Name	Hangeul	Hanja
Cheongsong-eup	청송읍	靑松邑
Juwangsan-myeon	주왕산면	周王山面
Bunam-myeon	부남면	府南面
Hyeondong-myeon	현동면	縣東面
Hyeongseo-myeon	현서면	縣西面
Andeok-myeon	안덕면	安德面
Pacheon-myeon	파천면	巴川面
Jinbo-myeon	진보면	眞寶面

== Climate ==
Cheongsong has a humid continental climate (Köppen: Dwa), but can be considered a borderline humid subtropical climate (Köppen: Cwa) using the −3 °C (27 °F) isotherm.

Climate data for Cheongsong (2011–2020 normals, extremes 2010–present)
Month	Jan	Feb	Mar	Apr	May	Jun	Jul	Aug	Sep	Oct	Nov	Dec	Year
Record high °C (°F)	14.1 (57.4)	22.7 (72.9)	25.4 (77.7)	31.5 (88.7)	35.8 (96.4)	36.6 (97.9)	38.1 (100.6)	38.1 (100.6)	36.4 (97.5)	30.8 (87.4)	24.2 (75.6)	17.3 (63.1)	38.1 (100.6)
Mean daily maximum °C (°F)	3.7 (38.7)	6.6 (43.9)	12.9 (55.2)	18.8 (65.8)	25.0 (77.0)	27.8 (82.0)	29.7 (85.5)	30.4 (86.7)	25.0 (77.0)	19.8 (67.6)	13.0 (55.4)	5.1 (41.2)	18.2 (64.8)
Daily mean °C (°F)	−2.8 (27.0)	−0.2 (31.6)	5.2 (41.4)	11.0 (51.8)	16.8 (62.2)	20.6 (69.1)	24.1 (75.4)	24.4 (75.9)	18.6 (65.5)	12.2 (54.0)	5.8 (42.4)	−1.2 (29.8)	11.2 (52.2)
Mean daily minimum °C (°F)	−8.8 (16.2)	−6.4 (20.5)	−1.8 (28.8)	3.5 (38.3)	9.1 (48.4)	14.6 (58.3)	19.7 (67.5)	20.1 (68.2)	14.2 (57.6)	6.7 (44.1)	0.2 (32.4)	−6.8 (19.8)	5.4 (41.7)
Record low °C (°F)	−21.4 (−6.5)	−21.5 (−6.7)	−10.3 (13.5)	−5.0 (23.0)	0.8 (33.4)	6.0 (42.8)	12.4 (54.3)	11.7 (53.1)	4.1 (39.4)	−5.4 (22.3)	−9.5 (14.9)	−17.7 (0.1)	−21.5 (−6.7)
Average precipitation mm (inches)	16.8 (0.66)	24.1 (0.95)	46.4 (1.83)	81.7 (3.22)	56.7 (2.23)	93.7 (3.69)	196.6 (7.74)	174.5 (6.87)	137.6 (5.42)	83.8 (3.30)	37.6 (1.48)	17.7 (0.70)	967.2 (38.08)
Average precipitation days (≥ 0.1 mm)	4.7	4.6	8.0	9.4	7.6	8.8	14.4	14.7	10.3	6.3	7.1	5.6	101.5
Average relative humidity (%)	59.1	58.8	60.1	61.4	64.9	72.5	81.2	81.5	82.6	78.8	72.6	62.3	69.7
Mean monthly sunshine hours	184.1	175.4	216.7	209.3	244.2	183.2	151.3	163.7	130.5	162.3	139.9	168.6	2,129.2
Source: Korea Meteorological Administration

== Produce ==
Cheongsong is known among Koreans for its apples and for a famous prison situated around Cheongsong. Cheongsong apples took up a large percentage of consumed apples in Korea as well as Seoul. Originally, Cheongsong produced a large variety of apples but now produces mainly Korean 'Sundown' apples.

Another famous product of Cheongsong is the Cheongyang pepper, a Korean hot chili pepper. It was developed in Chongsong and Youngyang, hence the portmanteau, "CheongYang".

== Attractions ==
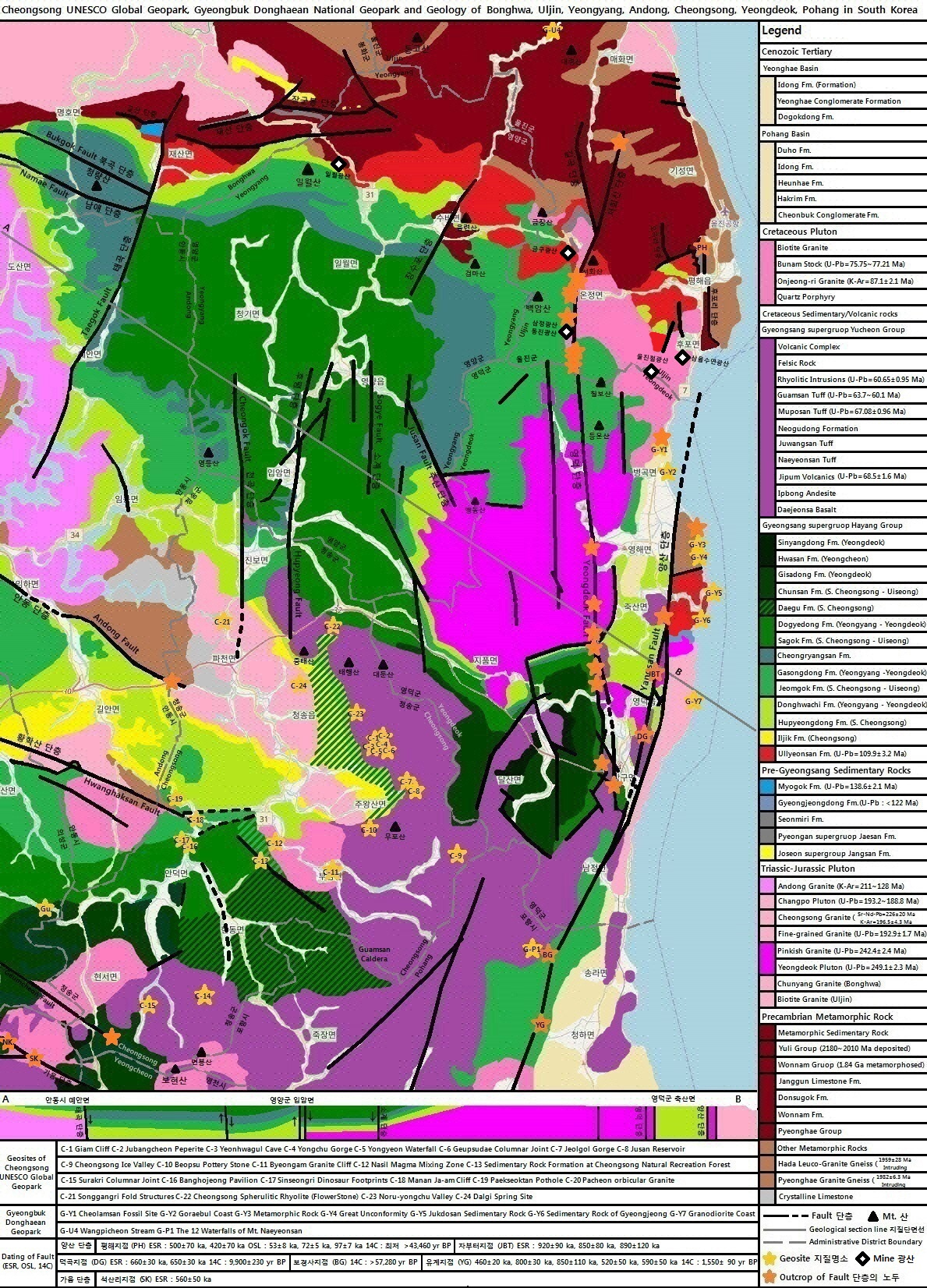
Geological map of Cheongsong UNESCO Global Geoparks

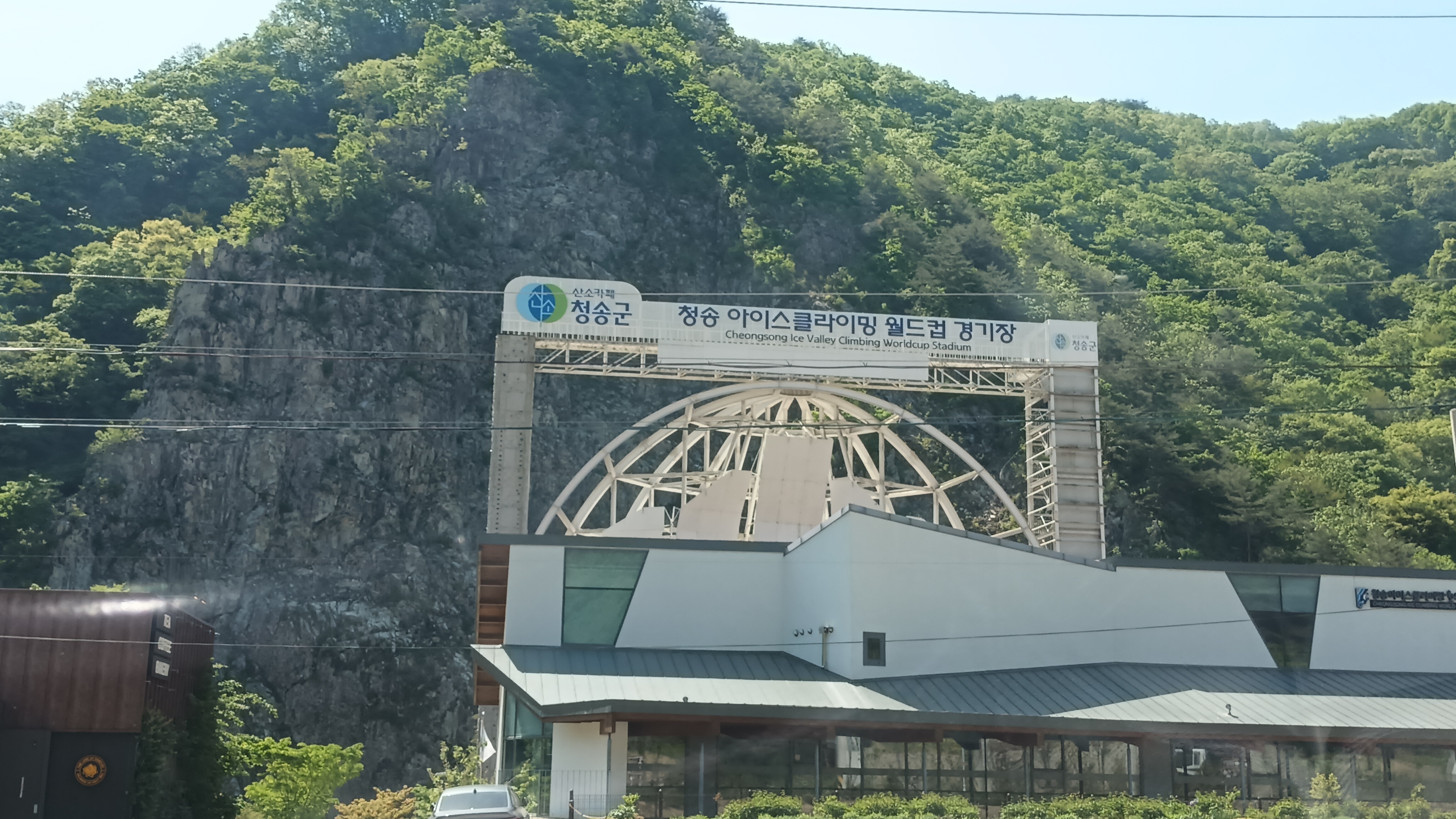
Cheongsong Ice Valley Climbing Worldcup Stadium

Daejeonsa Temple is the largest in Cheongsong-gun. The Bogwangjeon building, is Korea's treasure no. 1570, and in its procession is the woodblock of a handwritten letter from Lee Yeo-song, a general of the Ming Dynasty, to Samyeong Daisa.

Jusan Pond, located in the county, was the site of filming for Kim Ki-duk's 2003 film Spring, Summer, Fall, Winter... and Spring. The floating monastery was built for the purpose of the film, and Kim obtained permission from the authorities to keep it there for a year. Filming took place over the course of that year, numbering 22 days in total, after which the set was removed and destroyed as he pond is part of a national park, so no buildings are permitted.

== Sister cities ==
- Suqian, China
