= Acocks Green railway station =

Railway station in Birmingham, England

Acocks Green
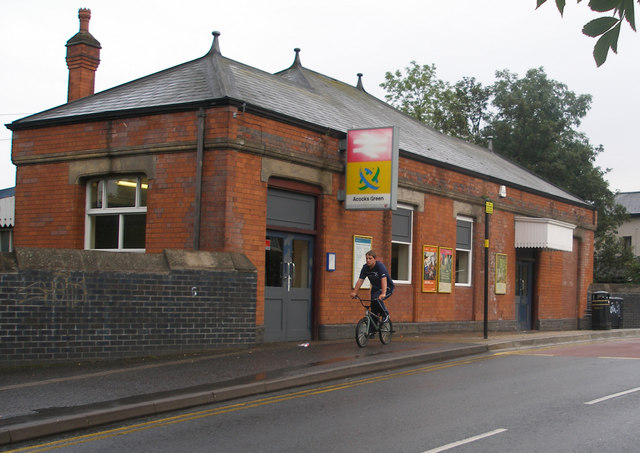
- Acocks Green Railway Station, with the old Centro logo (August 2006)

General information
- Location: Acocks Green, City of Birmingham; England
- Coordinates: 52.449°N 1.818°W
- Grid reference: SP123835
- Manager: West Midlands Trains
- Transit authority: Transport for West Midlands
- Platforms: 2

Other information
- Station code: ACG
- Fare zone: 3
- Classification: DfT category E

Key dates
- 1 October 1852: Station opens as Acocks Green
- 1878: Station renamed Acocks Green and South Yardley
- 6 May 1968: Station renamed Acocks Green

Passengers
- 2020/21: ▼0.139 million
- 2021/22: ▲0.272 million
- 2022/23: ▲0.305 million
- 2023/24: ▲0.372 million
- 2024/25: ▲0.418 million
Location
Notes
- Passenger statistics from the Office of Rail and Road

Acocks Green railway station (previously known as Acocks Green & South Yardley) serves the Acocks Green area of Birmingham, in the West Midlands region of England. Pre-nationalisation a GWR station on their main line from London (Paddington) to Birkenhead (Woodside) the station is now served by West Midlands Railway, who manage the station.

== History ==
Acocks Green was built to connect the local community to the industrialised areas of the city. Although the station never had a goods yard, Acocks Green boasted 4 platforms, and a loop line on the northbound slow line. British Rail rationalisation led to the removal of the slow lines (and loop) in both directions and the demolition of one island platform to allow for the construction of the current car park.

== Services ==
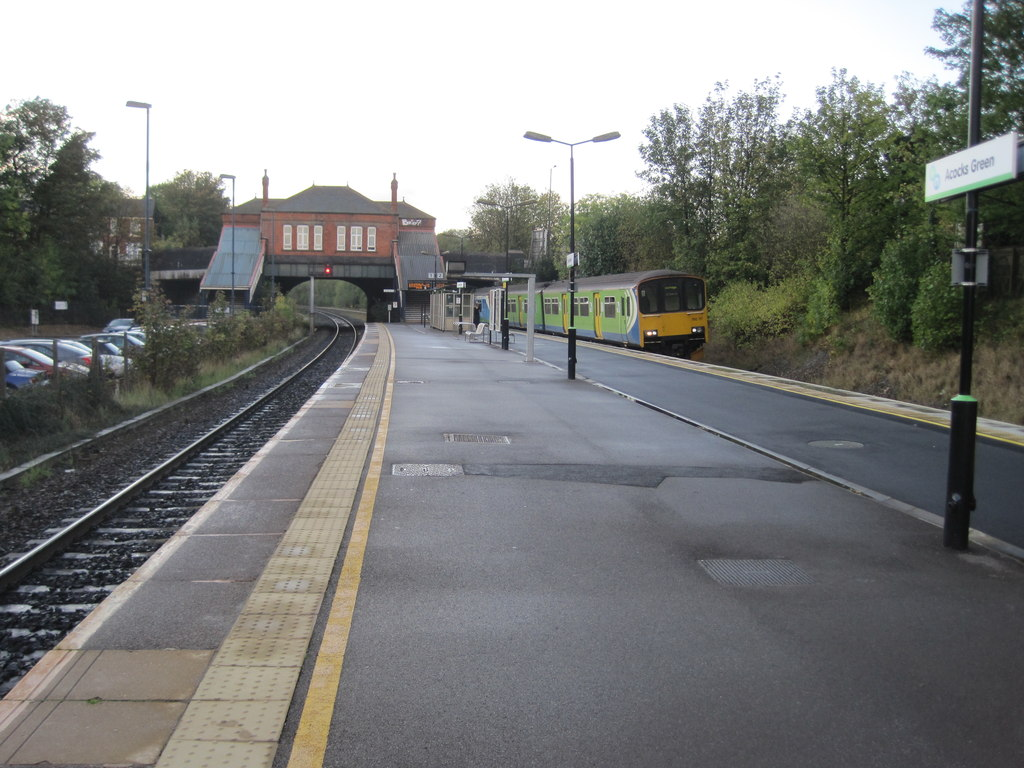
The remaining platforms in 2011

The station is served by West Midlands Railway on the Snow Hill Lines. Services operate every 30 minutes in each direction.

- 2 trains per hour run westbound to Birmingham Snow Hill, continuing to Worcester Foregate Street and/or Worcester Shrub Hill via Smethwick Galton Bridge, Stourbridge Junction, Kidderminster and Droitwich Spa
- 2 trains per hour operate eastbound to Dorridge via Solihull, one of which continues to Stratford-upon-Avon. Two evening services extend to Leamington Spa via Warwick.

Acocks Green is no longer served by Chiltern Railways services as of the May 2023 timetable change. Services used to run southbound towards Banbury, High Wycombe and Marylebone.

| Preceding station | National Rail | Following station |
|---|---|---|
| Olton | West Midlands Railway; Stratford - Birmingham - Worcester via Kidderminster; Snow Hill lines | Tyseley or Small Heath |
| Olton | West Midlands Railway; Leamington - Birmingham - Worcester | Tyseley or Small Heath |
