= Small Heath railway station =

Railway station in Birmingham, England

Small Heath
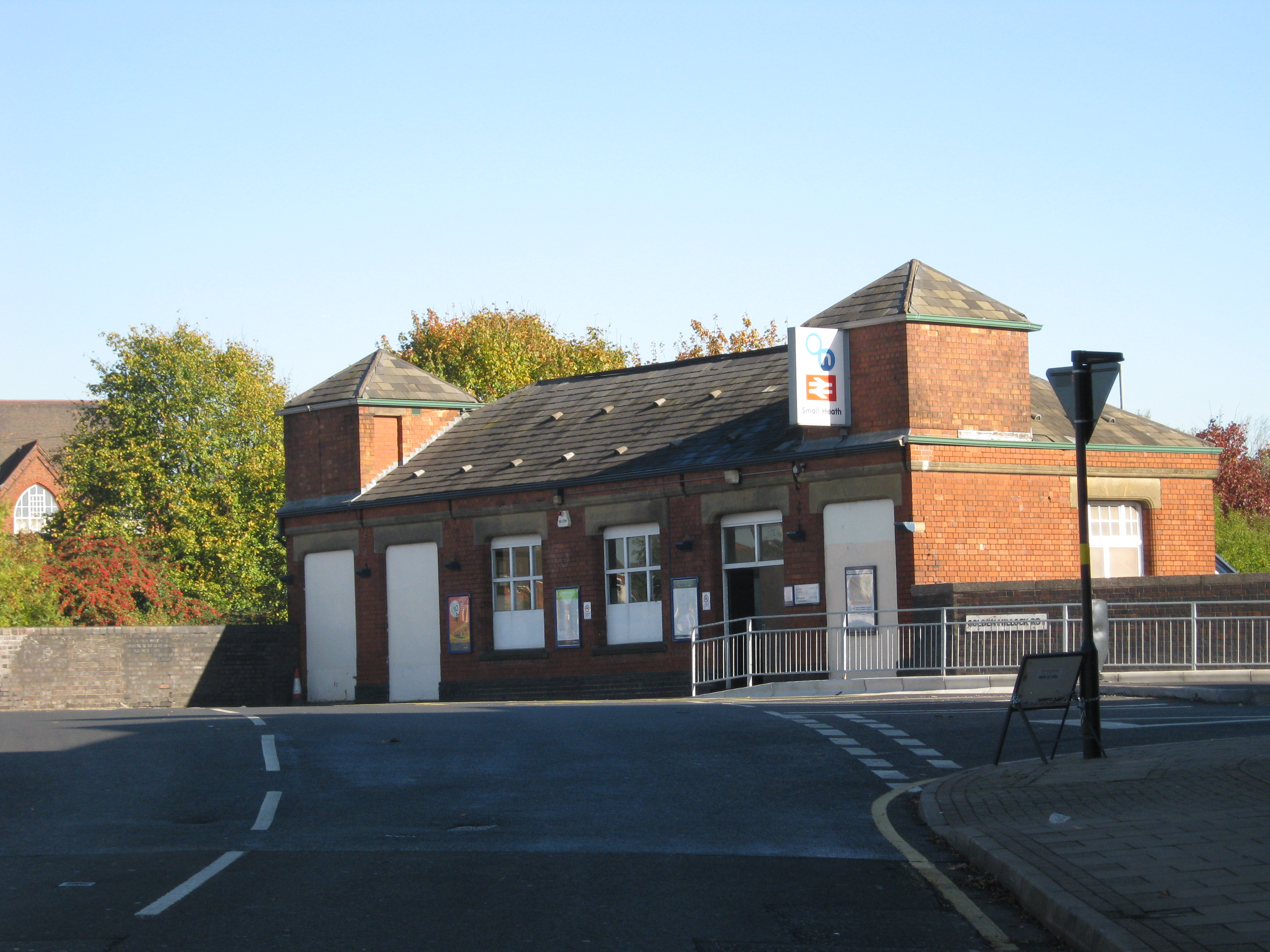

General information
- Location: Small Heath, City of Birmingham; England
- Coordinates: 52.463°N 1.858°W
- Grid reference: SP096850
- Manager: West Midlands Trains
- Transit authority: Transport for West Midlands
- Platforms: 2

Other information
- Station code: SMA
- Fare zone: 2
- Classification: DfT category E

History
- Opened: 1863

Passengers
- 2021/22: ▲0.121 million
- 2022/23: ▲0.144 million
- 2023/24: ▲0.195 million
- 2024/25: ▲0.224 million
- 2025/26: ▲0.226 million
Location
Notes
- Passenger statistics from the Office of Rail and Road

Small Heath railway station serves the areas of Small Heath and Sparkbrook in Birmingham, West Midlands, England. The station is managed by West Midlands Trains, which runs all the services.

== History ==
The former Great Western Railway station building, opened in 1863 as Small Heath and Sparkbrook on the main line from London Paddington to Birkenhead Woodside, is on a bridge over the tracks shared with Golden Hillock Road (the B4145). The A45 Small Heath Highway runs alongside. To the other side is the site of the former BSA factory. Nearby are the largely disused sidings which served local industry in the area.

Queen Victoria alighted at the station on 23 March 1887, while making a royal visit to nearby Small Heath Park and the city of Birmingham.

The station once had four platforms (both in an island configuration) in use, following the quadrupling of the line by the Great Western Railway in 1906, but only the western pair are now operational (as these are the only ones that trains can use to reach Moor Street & Snow Hill).

== Services ==
On Mondays to Saturdays, daytime service is generally three trains per hour.

West Midlands Railway run services as part of the Snow Hill Lines.

Northbound, there are three trains per hour to Birmingham Snow Hill. Trains continue to Kidderminster via Smethwick Galton Bridge and Stourbridge Junction, with 1tph continuing to Worcester via Droitwich Spa.

Southbound, there is one train per hour to Dorridge via Solihull and two trains per hour to Whitlocks End via Shirley, with one of the Whitlocks End services extending to Stratford-upon-Avon via the North Warwickshire Line.

There is no Sunday service.

London Midland proposed the closure of the ticket office in 2011. This request was denied.

Preceding station	National Rail	Following station
Acocks Green or Tyseley	West Midlands Railway; Stratford - Birmingham - Worcester via Kidderminster; Snow Hill Lines	Bordesley or Birmingham Moor Street
Acocks Green or Tyseley	West Midlands Railway; Leamington to Worcester	Bordesley or Birmingham Moor Street
