= Tyseley railway station =

Railway station in Birmingham, England

Tyseley
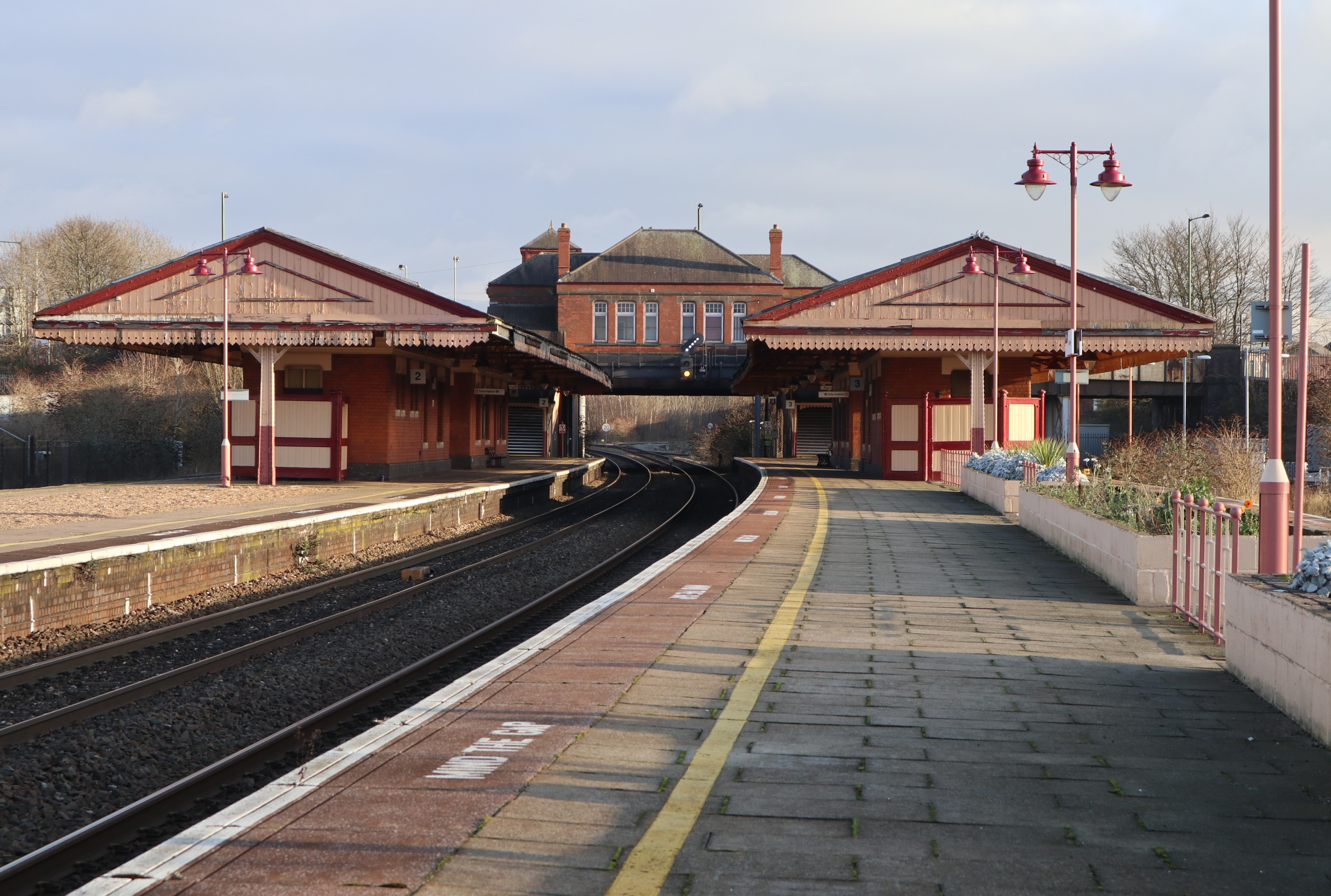
- Tyseley Station pictured in 2022 looking Southbound

General information
- Location: Tyseley, City of Birmingham; England
- Coordinates: 52.454°N 1.839°W
- Grid reference: SP109840
- Manager: West Midlands Trains
- Transit authority: Transport for West Midlands
- Platforms: 4

Other information
- Station code: TYS
- Fare zone: 2
- Classification: DfT category E

Key dates
- 1906: Opened by Great Western Railway

Passengers
- 2021/22: ▲0.124 million
- 2022/23: ▲0.148 million
- 2023/24: ▲0.198 million
- 2024/25: ▲0.244 million
- 2025/26: ▲0.258 million
Location
Notes
- Passenger statistics from the Office of Rail and Road

Tyseley railway station serves the district of Tyseley in Birmingham, West Midlands, England. It is at the junction of the lines linking Birmingham with Leamington Spa and Stratford-upon-Avon.

West Midlands Trains manages the station and operates all of the trains that serve it.

The main station building is on a bridge over the tracks, on the Wharfedale Road (B4146). The station, which has two island platforms, is next to a railway depot and Tyseley Locomotive Works.

== History ==
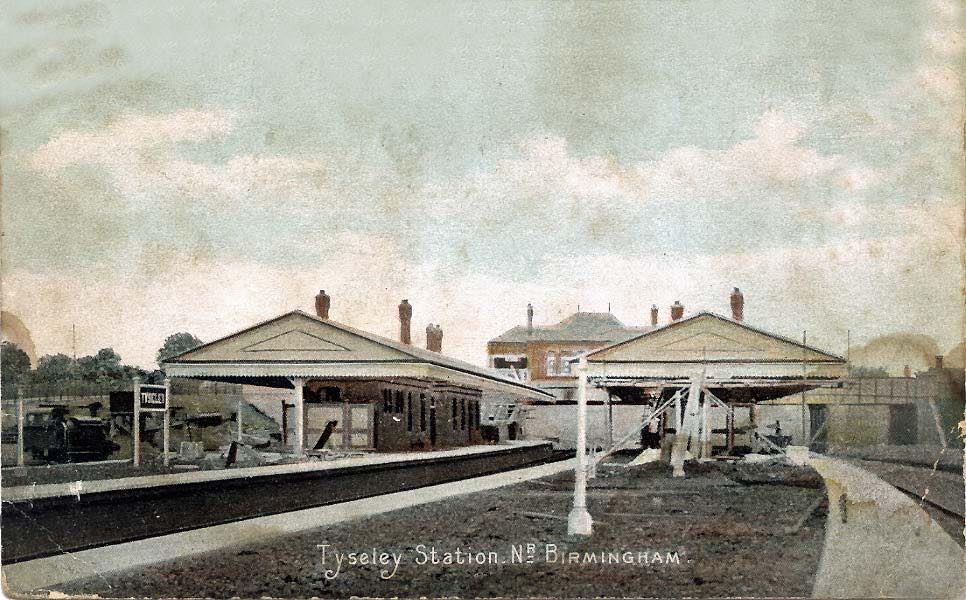
Colourised 1906 postcard showing "Tyseley Station, Nr. Birmingham", around the time of its opening. Some evidence of construction work can be seen on the platforms.

The Great Western Railway opened the station in 1906. It is on what was the GWR main line between London Paddington and Birkenhead Woodside. It was built with four platforms, but later British Railways took platforms 1 and 2 out of use.

At the time of opening, the area surrounding the station, Yardley Rural District, was outside Birmingham, becoming part of the city in April 1912 under the 1911 Greater Birmingham Act.

Since the mid-1990s traffic on the line has increased. In 2007–08 Network Rail resignalled the line between Birmingham and Warwick, modified the track at Tyseley and restored platforms 1 and 2 to use.

Trains to and from Solihull are now able to use the new 60 mph (97 km/h) Tyseley North Junction. Two new junctions have been built at each end of the station, which allow non-stopping services between Solihull and Birmingham Snow Hill to cross at 60 mph.

== Services ==
On Mondays to Saturdays, daytime service is generally three trains per hour.

Westbound:

- Three trains per hour (tph) run to Kidderminster via Birmingham Snow Hill and Stourbridge Junction, with 1tph continuing to Worcester Shrub Hill and/or Worcester Foregate Street via Droitwich Spa. One late evening service extends to Leamington Spa via Warwick.

Eastbound:

- 1tph run to Dorridge via Solihull.
- 2tph run to Whitlocks End via Shirley, with one extending to Stratford-upon-Avon.

On Sundays, there is an hourly service each way - eastbound to Stratford-upon-Avon via Shirley and westbound to Worcester Foregate Street.

Tyseley is no longer served by Chiltern Railways services as of the May 2023 timetable change. Services used to run southbound towards Banbury, High Wycombe and Marylebone.

Preceding station	National Rail	Following station
Acocks Green	West Midlands Railway; Stratford - Birmingham - Worcester via Kidderminster; Snow Hill lines	Small Heath or Birmingham Moor Street
Acocks Green	West Midlands Railway; Leamington to Worcester	Small Heath or Birmingham Moor Street
Spring Road	West Midlands Railway; Stratford - Whitlocks End - Birmingham - Worcester via Kidderminster	Small Heath
	Heritage railways	
Birmingham; Moor Street	Vintage Trains; The Shakespeare Express; July–September	Henley-in-Arden
