= Olton railway station =

Railway station in the West Midlands, England

Coordinates: 52.439°N 1.804°W

Olton
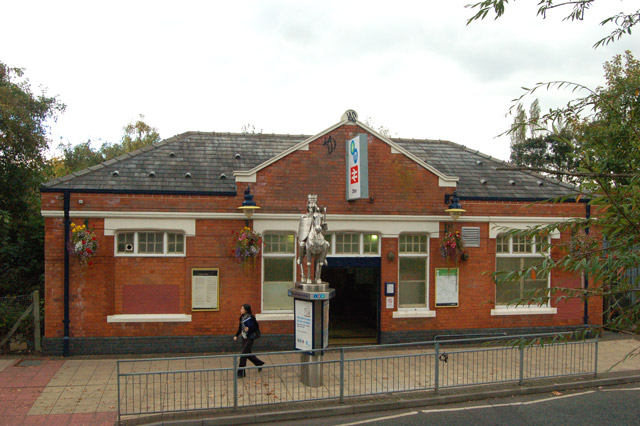

General information
- Location: Olton, Metropolitan Borough of Solihull; England
- Grid reference: SP134822
- Manager: West Midlands Trains
- Transit authority: Transport for West Midlands
- Platforms: 2

Other information
- Station code: OLT
- Fare zone: 4
- Classification: DfT category E

History
- Opened: 1869

Passengers
- 2020/21: ▼0.106 million
- 2021/22: ▲0.285 million
- 2022/23: ▲0.343 million
- 2023/24: ▲0.396 million
- 2024/25: ▲0.463 million
Location
Notes
- Passenger statistics from the Office of Rail and Road

Olton railway station serves the Olton area of the town of Solihull, in the West Midlands of England. The station is operated by West Midlands Trains. The entrance, seen in the centre where the station's booking office is located, leads into a tunnel which runs under the tracks providing an access staircase and lift to the island platform. The station also has a car park and bicycle racks.

== History ==
=== Origins ===
Olton station was opened in 1869 on the GWR's Oxford & Birmingham Branch and its prime role was as a suburban passenger station for Birmingham commuters, explaining why the booking office was located on the down platform.

Olton originally had two signal boxes, the first of which only had 10 levers. It was built by McKenzie and Holland and located at the Leamington Spa end of the up platform which was replaced in June 1913 but was ultimately closed in 1933.

=== Expansion ===
Olton station originally had a two-platform configuration with basic facilities, but taking advantage of the Development (Loan Guarantees and Grants) Act 1929 (20 & 21 Geo. 5. c. 7), the Great Western Railway continued to quadruple the Birmingham Main Line as far as Lapworth, rebuilding five stations including Olton with two wide island platforms in 1932. The new approach 'Station Drive' was also constructed.

=== Current layout ===
The station now has one wide island platform with trains to Solihull, Leamington Spa and London stopping one side and to Birmingham and Worcester the other. The platform building has been significantly reduced by the removal of its roof canopy.

== Incidents ==
Showell's Dictionary of Birmingham, discussing railway accidents in the city, notes that:

Police-officer Kimberley was killed in the crush at Olton Station on the Race Day, Feb. 11th, 1875.

== Services ==
West Midlands Railway:

The station is served by West Midlands Trains on the Snow Hill Lines.

Services operate every 30 minutes in each direction.

- 2 trains per hour run westbound to Birmingham Snow Hill, continuing to Worcester Foregate Street and/or Worcester Shrub Hill via Smethwick Galton Bridge, Stourbridge Junction, Kidderminster and Droitwich Spa
- 2 trains per hour operate eastbound to Dorridge via Solihull, one of which continues to Stratford-upon-Avon. Two evening services extend to Leamington Spa via Warwick.

On Sundays, there is an hourly service each way between Stourbridge Junction and Dorridge.

Chiltern Railways:

Olton is no longer served by Chiltern Railways services as of the May 2023 timetable change. Services used to run southbound towards Banbury, High Wycombe and Marylebone.

Preceding station	National Rail	Following station
Acocks Green	West Midlands Railway; Leamington/Stratford-Worcester; Snow Hill Lines	Solihull
