= Urban rail in the United Kingdom =

Commuter and suburban heavy rail systems in the United Kingdom

Urban and suburban rail plays a key role in public transport in many of the major cities of the United Kingdom. Urban rail refers to the train service between city centres and suburbs or nearby towns that acts as a main mode of transport for travellers on a daily basis. They consist of several railway lines connecting city centre stations of major cities to suburbs and surrounding towns.

Unlike light rail and metro systems, train services and ticketing are fully integrated with the national rail network and are not considered separate. In London, a route for Crossrail 2 has been safeguarded.

== Overview ==
=== Advantages over light rail ===
Unlike most light rail systems, most urban rail networks are part of National Rail, which often allows easy interchange with mainline rail, and only one ticket needs to be bought if a journey includes both mainline and urban rail. Bicycles can be taken on board in the majority of cases, and existing railways can be used, rather than new light railways being built.

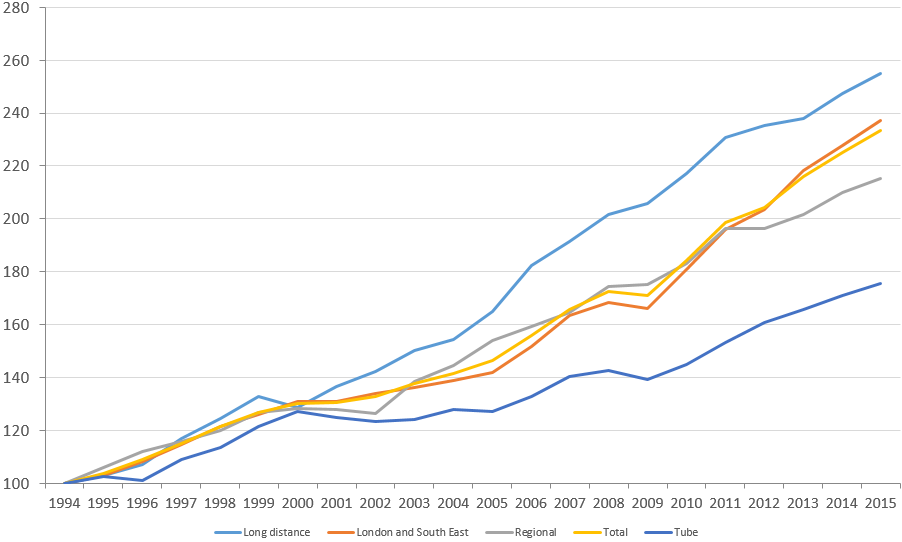
Increase in passenger rail by sector 1994–2015, as well as a comparison with the London Underground.

Urban rail usually has higher capacity than light rail because of longer trains (but often lower frequency), and higher average speed because of fewer stops.

In some cases, suburban railway networks have their own ticketing system, as in West Yorkshire.

=== Services ===
A few urban railways offer service during peak times only, and others operate less frequent trains during the evenings and on Sundays.

Networks often encompass a few major stations in a large city, with other stations being medium or minor. Services can be provided by one train operating company operating exclusively on an urban rail network, such as in Merseyside, or by a company that also operates regional and national services, like in Bristol, Cardiff, Edinburgh and Glasgow.

== Belfast ==
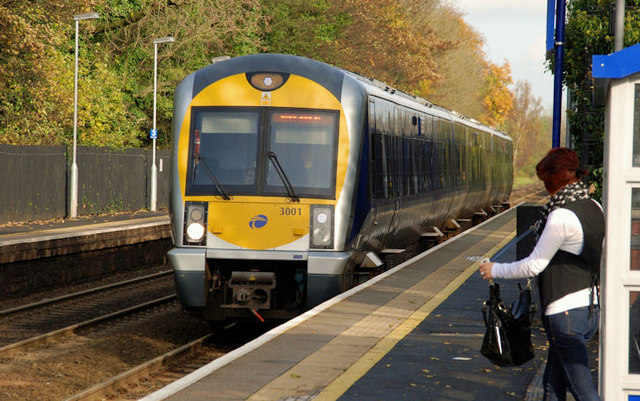
Belfast area Class 3000 at Dunmurry

NI Railways Map, showing Belfast suburban rail in grey

In Northern Ireland's capital, Northern Ireland Railways Belfast suburban rail serves Greater Belfast. Services run about every 20 minutes from 06:00 until 00:00 on:

- Larne Line: Belfast Grand Central – Belfast Lanyon Place – Larne Harbour
- Portadown Line: Belfast Grand Central – Portadown – Newry
- Bangor Line: Belfast Grand Central – Belfast Lanyon Place – Sydenham – Bangor

Belfast Suburban Rail serves 39 different stations on three lines.

== Birmingham ==
The West Midlands rail network

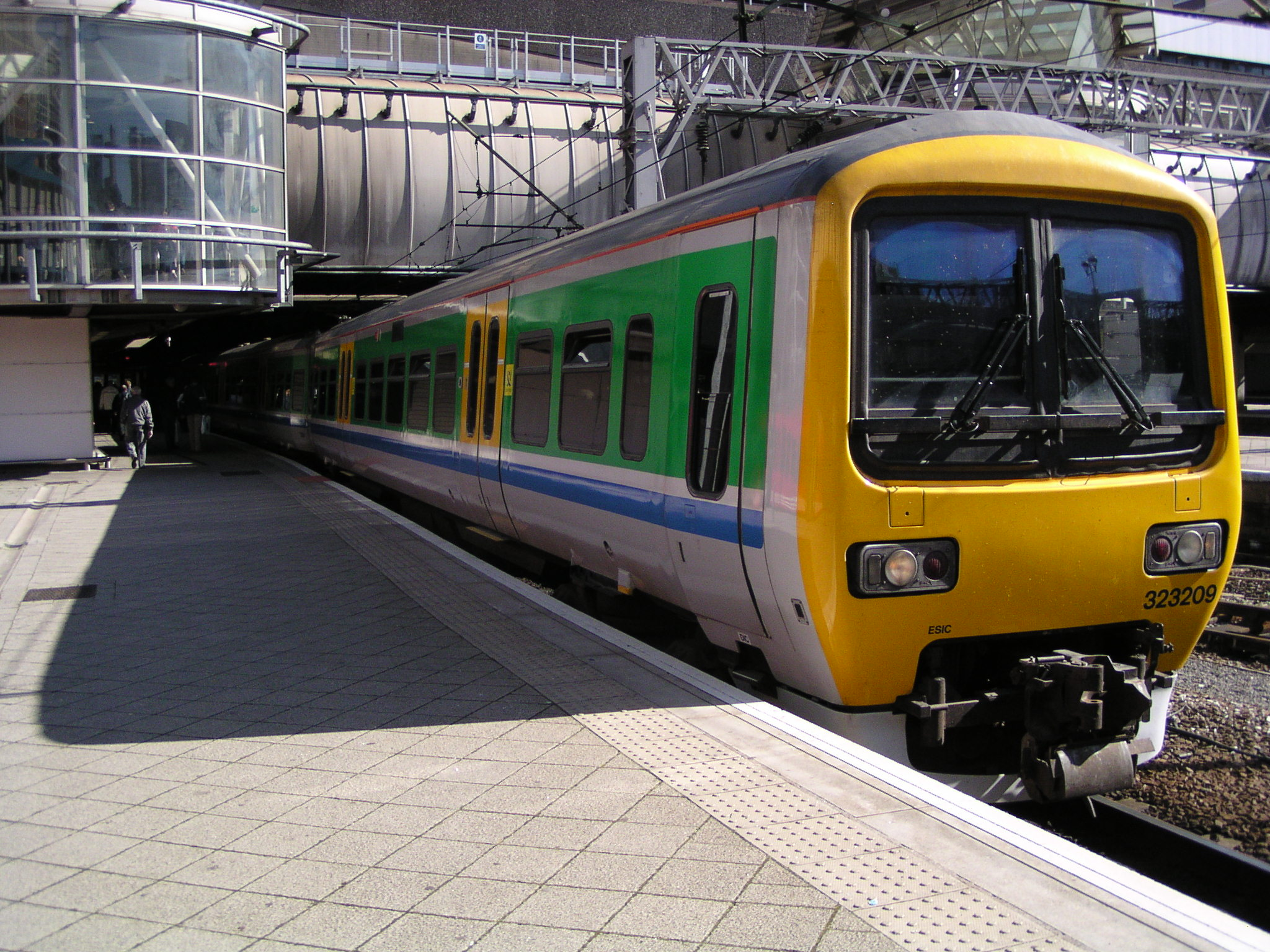
London Midland Class 323 at Birmingham New Street

Co-ordinated and subsidised by Transport for West Midlands (TfWM), West Midlands Trains operates a network of 75 stations in the West Midlands county focused on Birmingham. West Midlands Trains operate the West Midlands suburban routes under the West Midlands Railway branding to distinguish them from their longer-distance routes. The main city-centre station is Birmingham New Street, operated by Network Rail; the other city-centre stations are Birmingham Snow Hill and Birmingham Moor Street. The other main stations in the West Midlands are Wolverhampton and Coventry.

During 2024/25, there were 65.8 million rail passenger boardings in the TfWM area. Birmingham has the highest proportion of rail commuters in England outside London. In the past few decades the proportion of journeys into central Birmingham by rail has grown sharply: 29% of journeys into Birmingham city centre in the peak hours were made by rail in 2015, compared to 17% in 2001, 12% in 1991.

Most of the Birmingham and West Midlands County local suburban lines are centred on New Street station, including the Cross-City Line, the Chase Line, the Camp Hill Line and the Coventry–Wolverhampton line. Three suburban routes, known collectively as the Snow Hill lines run through Snow Hill and Moor Street stations. Services run at ten-minute frequencies on the busiest routes, with most other routes operating at least a 15–20 or 30 minute frequency. Routes are listed below:

West Midlands Trains routes operating from Birmingham New Street:

- Birmingham Loop: Wolverhampton–Birmingham New Street–Birmingham International–Coventry.
- Camp Hill line: Birmingham New Street–Kings Heath–Kings Norton
- Cross-City Line: Lichfield Trent Valley–Birmingham New Street–Longbridge–Redditch/Bromsgrove
- Chase Line: Birmingham New Street–Walsall–Rugeley Trent Valley
- Birmingham–Worcester–Hereford: Birmingham New Street–Bromsgrove–Worcester Foregate Street–Great Malvern–Hereford
- Birmingham–Shrewsbury: Birmingham New Street–Wolverhampton–Telford Central–Wellington–Shrewsbury

Three lines, known collectively as the Snow Hill lines, operate from Birmingham Snow Hill and Birmingham Moor Street stations:

- Chiltern Main Line: Birmingham Snow Hill–Birmingham Moor Street–Solihull–Dorridge–Leamington Spa (continuing to London Marylebone)
- North Warwickshire Line: Birmingham Snow Hill–Birmingham Moor Street–Whitlocks End–Stratford-upon-Avon.
- Birmingham to Worcester via Kidderminster line: Birmingham Snow Hill–Smethwick Galton Bridge–Stourbridge Junction–Kidderminster–Worcester.

Other routes operating from the TFWM area but not centred on Birmingham include:

- Elephant & Bear Line: Leamington Spa–Kenilworth–Coventry–Coventry Arena–Bedworth–Nuneaton
- Stourbridge Town branch line: Stourbridge Junction–Stourbridge Town

The West Midlands Combined Authority, created in 2016, pursued plans to restore local passenger services to the Camp Hill line in southern Birmingham, which was previously freight only, by constructing new chords into Birmingham Moor Street station. Local passenger services were reinstated in April 2026, with three new stations at Moseley Village, Kings Heath and Pineapple Road. Restoration of local passenger services to the previously freight-only Walsall to Wolverhampton line, was also pursued, and two new stations have opened at Darlaston and Wilenhall

Centro was established in 1969 following the Transport Act 1968. The Transport Act 1985 deregulated and privatised bus services across the UK. The West Midlands Passenger Transport Executive co-ordinated the services of all local private bus operators and adopted the name of Centro shortly afterwards to distinguish its new role from its previous role as an operator. In 2016 Centro was abolished and replaced by TfWM.

== Bristol ==
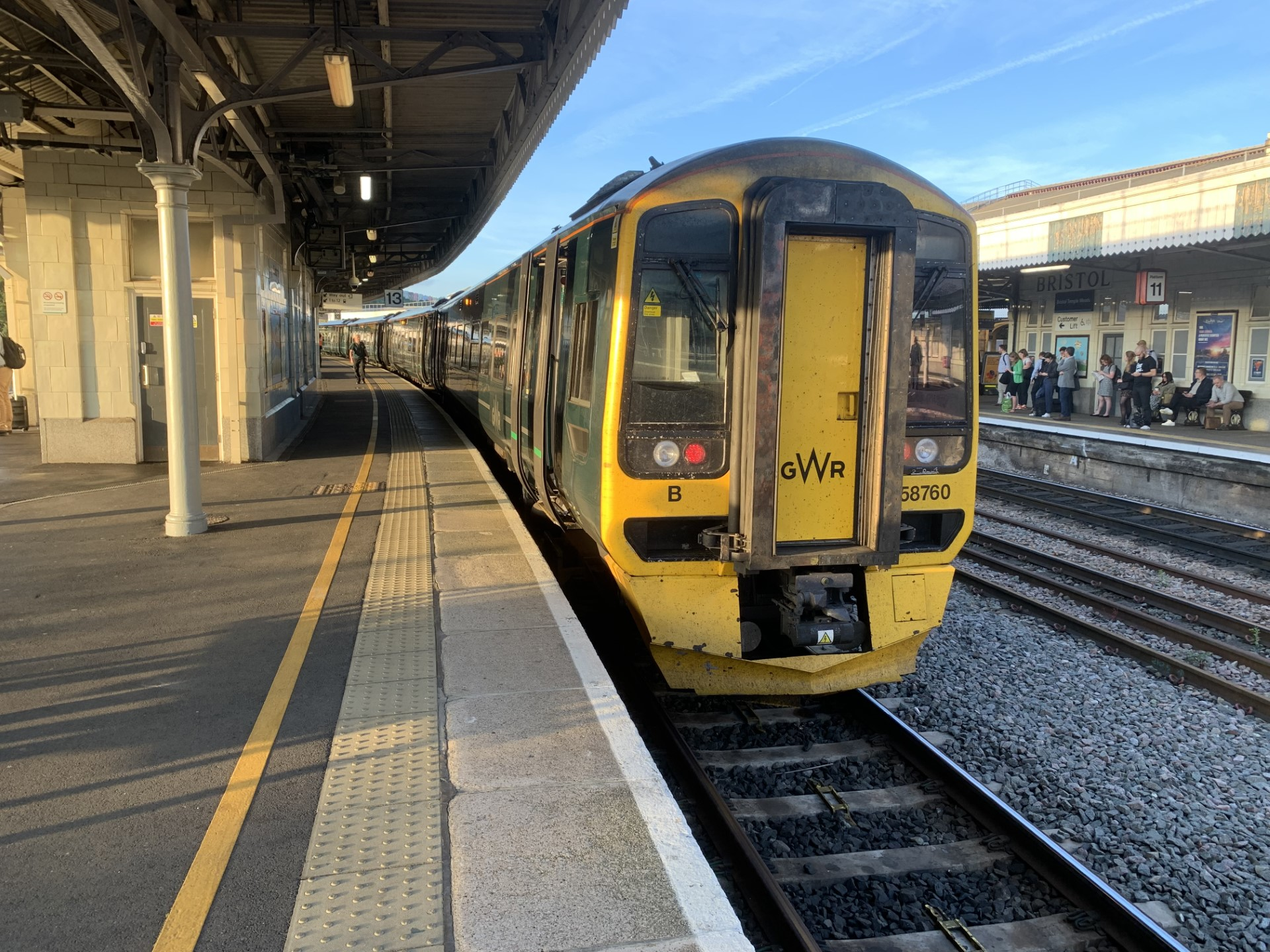
Great Western Railway class 158 at Bristol Temple Meads

Urban rail network in and around Bristol, including planned Portishead and Henbury lines

There are 13 suburban and two mainline stations (Bristol Temple Meads and Bristol Parkway) in Bristol, all operated by Great Western Railway. The only suburban line is the 13.5 mile long Severn Beach Line with 11 stations and 1.25 million journeys in 2016/7. The operator estimates that 57% of travellers on the line commute, rather than travelling for leisure. Services run every half an hour to Avonmouth and continue every hour to Severn Beach. As part of the MetroWest local rail expansion project, a further two suburban lines from Bristol Temple Meads to Henbury and Portishead were due to open in 2021 and 2023 respectively. Services also run from Gloucester - Westbury and Cardiff Central - Taunton via Bristol.

Other suburban stations lie on main lines:

- South Wales Main Line (Bristol – Cardiff Central via Newport),
- Great Western Main Line (Bristol – London Paddington via Bath Spa, Chippenham, Swindon and Reading) and
- Wessex Main Line (Bristol – Southampton via Bath and Salisbury).

Commuter services operate to and from nearby Bath, as well as a Weston-super-Mare to Bristol Parkway service via Bedminster.

== Cardiff ==
The network within Cardiff

The Valley Lines network of eight lines (Cardiff Bay Line, City Line, Coryton Line, Maesteg Line, Merthyr Line, Rhondda Line, Rhymney Line and Vale of Glamorgan Line) incorporates 20 stations in Cardiff, the capital of Wales, and 61 in surrounding towns and villages. Its hubs are Cardiff Queen Street and Cardiff Central. Train frequencies are up to every five minutes. The Ebbw Valley Railway also carries commuters to the capital.

Transport for Wales operates the stations and services. In February 2008, the Ebbw Valley Railway re-opened after 45 years with an hourly service to Cardiff Central. Until the line's closure in 1962, passengers had had to change at Newport.

The Maesteg line is incorporated into the wider network: trains continue to Cheltenham Spa from Cardiff Central. The Vale of Glamorgan Line serves Cardiff Airport.

However, the network neglects large residential areas in the south-west and east of Cardiff, although the South Wales Main Line runs through these areas without any stations. These areas include Caerau in the south-west and Rumney and St Mellons in the east.

Between 1995 and 2001, the network (except the Maesteg Line) was operated by Valley Lines. It then became part of the Wales & Borders franchise before becoming part of the Arriva Trains Wales franchise in 2003, and subsequently the KeolisAmey Wales franchise in 2018.

Since 2021, works on the South Wales Metro have taken place to transform the Valley Lines into a Light Metro service, with brand new larger trains and much more frequent services. Electrification began in 2021 for the new trains which will run at a core frequency of 18 trains per hour.

== Edinburgh ==
Suburban rail map of Edinburgh

ScotRail operates four commuter lines (with 40 stations) in and around the Scottish capital: the North Clyde Line, the Borders Railway, the Edinburgh to Dunblane Line and the Fife Circle Line. Edinburgh Waverley and Haymarket are the city's two major stations with connections to mainline services.

A project to open a rail link to Edinburgh Airport was cancelled in September 2007 by the Scottish Government in favour of construction of an Edinburgh Gateway station at nearby Gogar, which connects with the Edinburgh tram network to take passengers to the terminal. A proposal to re-open the Edinburgh suburban railway line has been made by campaigning groups.

== Exeter ==
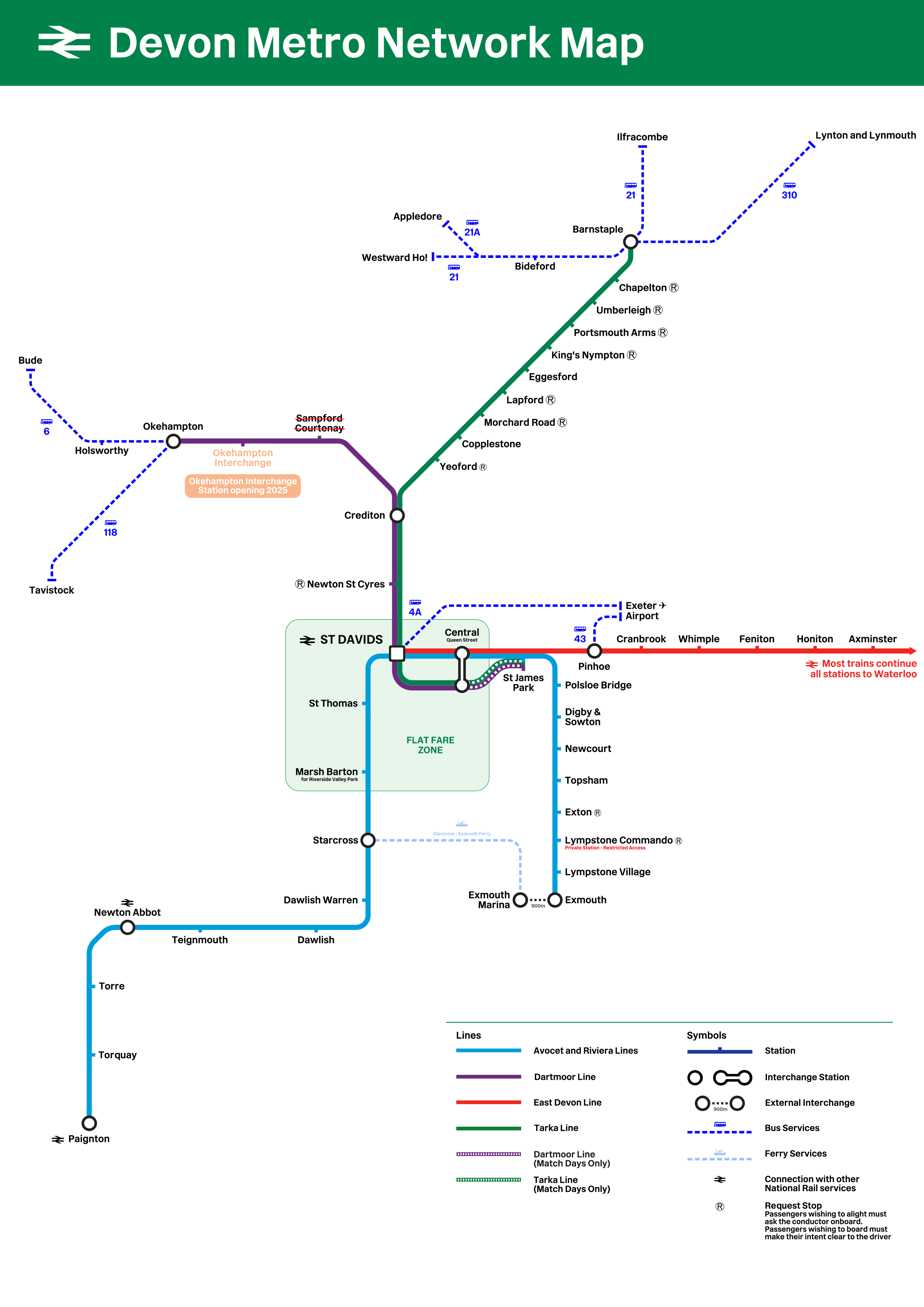
Schematic Map of the services of the Devon Metro network as of July 2024, including the section of the West of England Line branded as the East Devon Line by the DCRP.

Exeter serves as the regional hub for rail transport in Devon. There are 8 suburban stations and two mainline stations within the city limits (Exeter St Davids and Exeter Central), with many more in the Greater Exeter area.

Local services:

- Avocet and Riviera Lines, operated by GWR as a single continuous service (Exmouth – Paignton via the city centre)
- Tarka Line, operated by GWR (Exeter Central – Barnstaple)
- Dartmoor Line, operated by GWR (Exeter Central – Okehampton)
- East Devon Line, operated by SWR and also known as the West of England Line (Exeter St Davids – Axminster via Exeter Central, with most services continuing to Salisbury or London Waterloo)

Under the Devon Metro project multiple new stations within the city and its environs have opened in recent years, with the goal to eventually establish a rapid transit style service through incremental improvements to Exeter's existing urban rail network. Recent advancements in the scheme include the openings of Newcourt, Cranbrook and Marsh Barton railway stations, as well as an increased frequency of 2tph on the Riviera and Avocet Lines.

== Glasgow ==
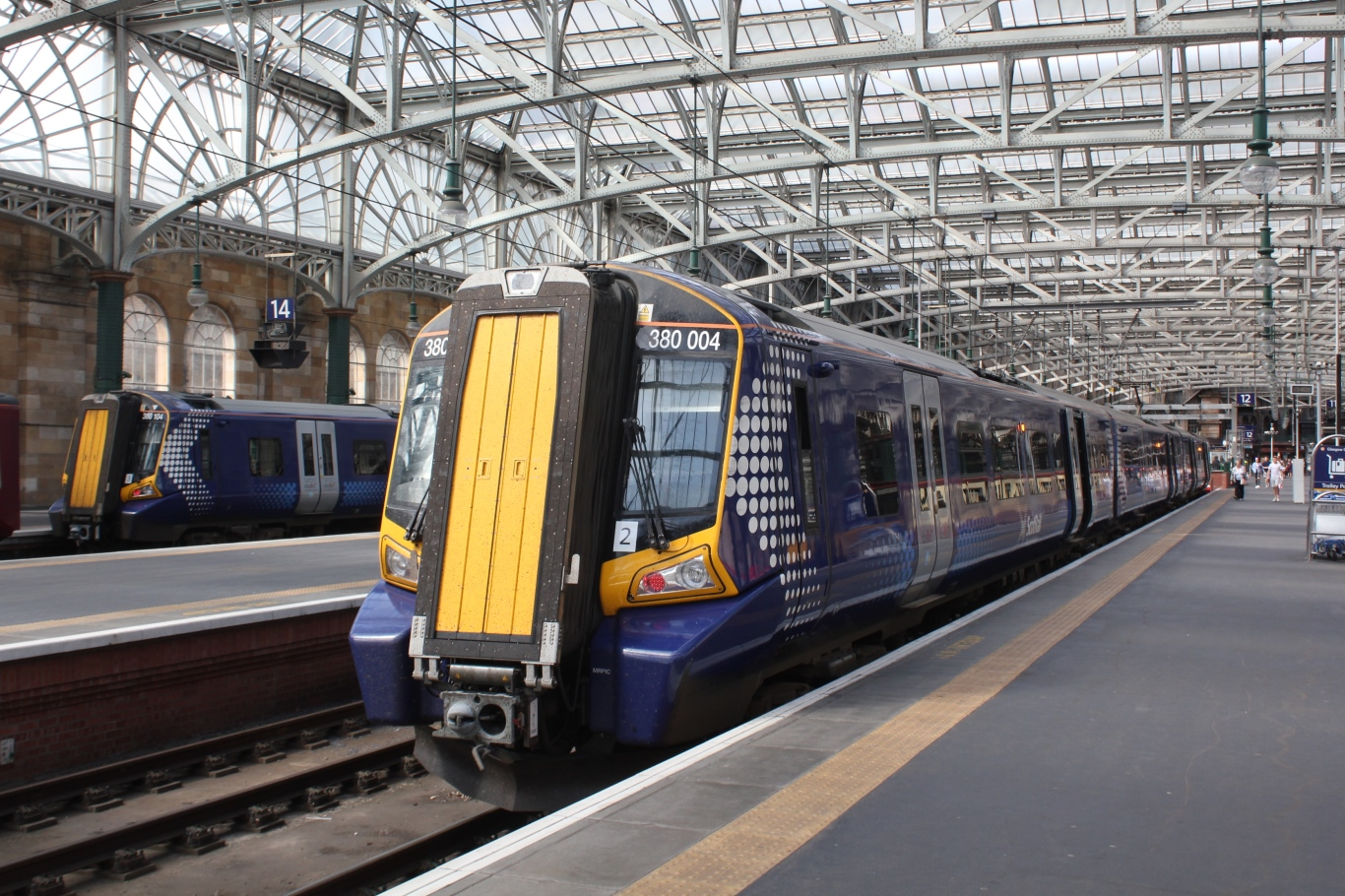
ScotRail's Class 380 at Glasgow Central.

Glasgow is Scotland's biggest city and has the UK's largest suburban rail network outside London. Much of the network is electrified, with some lines operated by diesel trains. Trains are operated by Abellio ScotRail; Transport Scotland oversees the management of routes, fares and timetables for all train services in Scotland – until 2005, train services around Glasgow were managed by Strathclyde Passenger Transport. Because of this historic split there are differences between train services in Strathclyde and the rest of Scotland. There is no first class travel in Strathclyde, and morning peak time finishes at 09:00 (rather than 09:15) with no evening peak time.

Glasgow Central and Glasgow Queen Street are the two mainline railway stations, both in the city centre. Services to the south leave from Central, and to the north leave from Queen Street. Two lines run underground east to west through the city centre: the North Clyde line through Queen Street and the Argyle Line through Central, from underground platforms below the mainline stations. The North Clyde and Argyle lines meet at Partick, which is also served by the Glasgow Subway. There are Glasgow Subway stations near Central (St Enoch) and Queen Street (Buchanan Street).

A bus services to Glasgow Airport operates from Paisley Gilmour Street station. Glasgow Prestwick Airport has its own railway station on the Ayrshire Coast line, and is the only airport in Scotland with its own station. A direct rail link from Glasgow Central to Glasgow International Airport was planned, but was cancelled in 2009.

== Liverpool ==
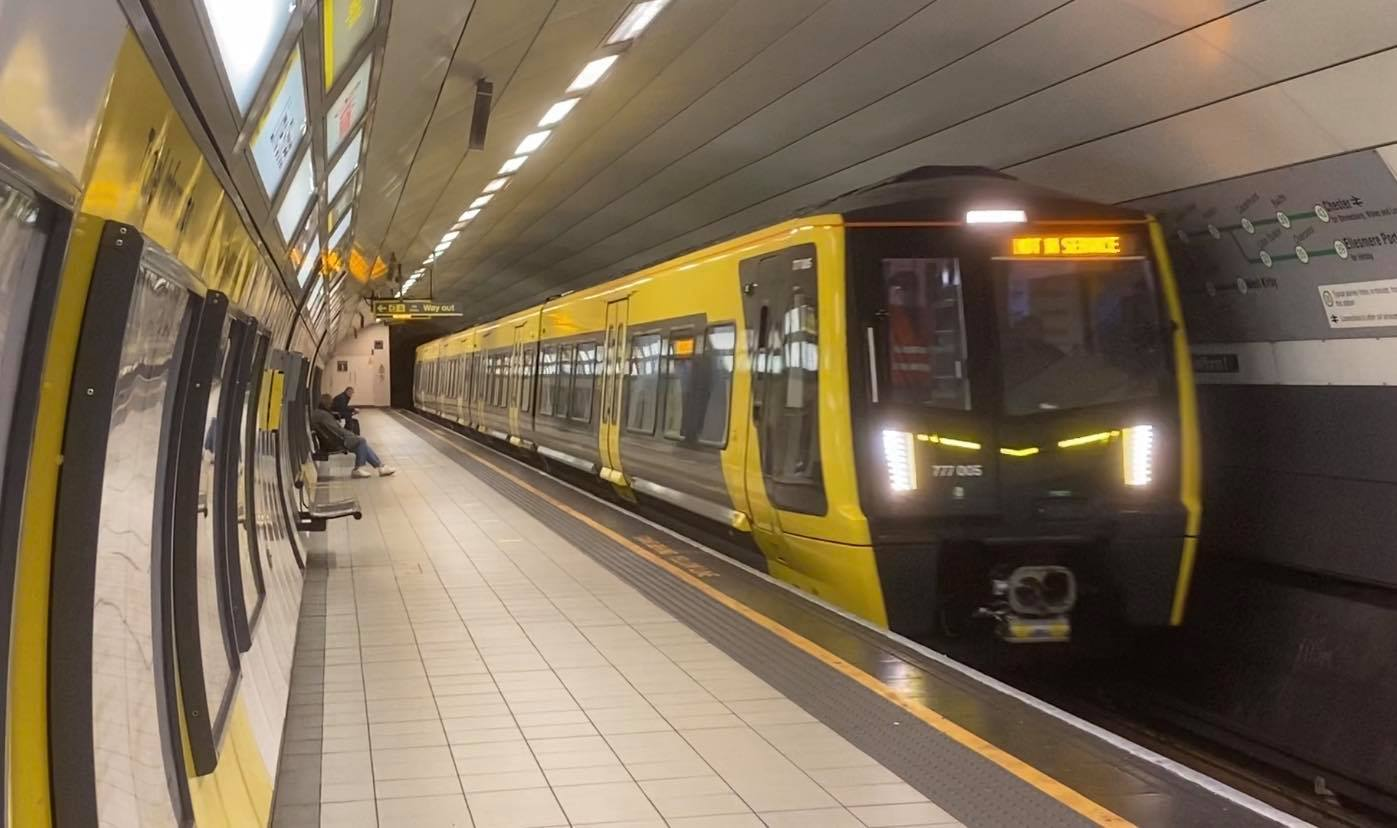
Merseyrail Class 777 at Liverpool Lime Street

Merseyrail map

The partially underground Merseyrail network consists of three lines, the Northern Line, Wirral Line and City Line, which interconnect in Liverpool's city centre. The Northern and Wirral Lines run in tunnels in the centres of Liverpool and Birkenhead. Liverpool is the nucleus of the network, which sees 100,000 people a day travel through 68 stations on the electrified lines. There are 21 stations on the City Line that serves the Merseyside area. The origins of the network are old, dating back 1848 and the Liverpool, Crosby and Southport Railway, one of the world's first commuter lines, and to the 1886 Mersey Railway, which was the world's second oldest underground passenger railway. An early commuter was Nathaniel Hawthorne, United States consul to Liverpool, 1853–57.

The 75 mile long electric third rail Northern and Wirral lines are 100% dedicated Merseyrail lines operating separately from the City Line. The City Line currently uses diesel trains operated by Northern. The local passenger transport executive, Merseytravel, brands all suburban rail lines running through Merseyside as Merseyrail with stations inside Merseyside branded as Merseyrail stations.

The Northern and Wirral lines are operated by Merseyrail. Suburban trains run on both the electrified lines. The service operates at metro frequencies in central Liverpool and Birkenhead.

The City line is operated by Northern running into Merseyside from outside the region, receiving funding from Merseytravel. The City line consists of non-electrified lines heading east and one electrified running south. Liverpool Lime Street is the terminus of the City line, with a connection to the Wirral line at Lime Street underground station. There is also a connection with the Northern Line at Liverpool South Parkway in the south of Liverpool. The City Line is to be electrified to the Wigan and Manchester branches.

The network includes the following lines:

- City Line: Liverpool Lime Street – Huyton – Wigan North Western
  or Liverpool Lime Street – Liverpool South Parkway – Manchester Oxford Road
  or Liverpool Lime Street – St Helens Junction – Manchester Victoria
  or Liverpool Lime Street – St Helens Junction – Manchester Piccadilly – Manchester Airport
  or Liverpool Lime Street – Huyton – St Helens Central – Preston – Blackpool North
- Wirral Line: Liverpool Lime Street – Liverpool Central – Birkenhead – West Kirby or New Brighton or Ellesmere Port or Chester
- Northern Line: Hunts Cross – Liverpool South Parkway – Liverpool Central – Headbolt Lane or Ormskirk
  or Hunts Cross – Liverpool South Parkway – Liverpool Central – Bootle – Southport

== Leeds ==
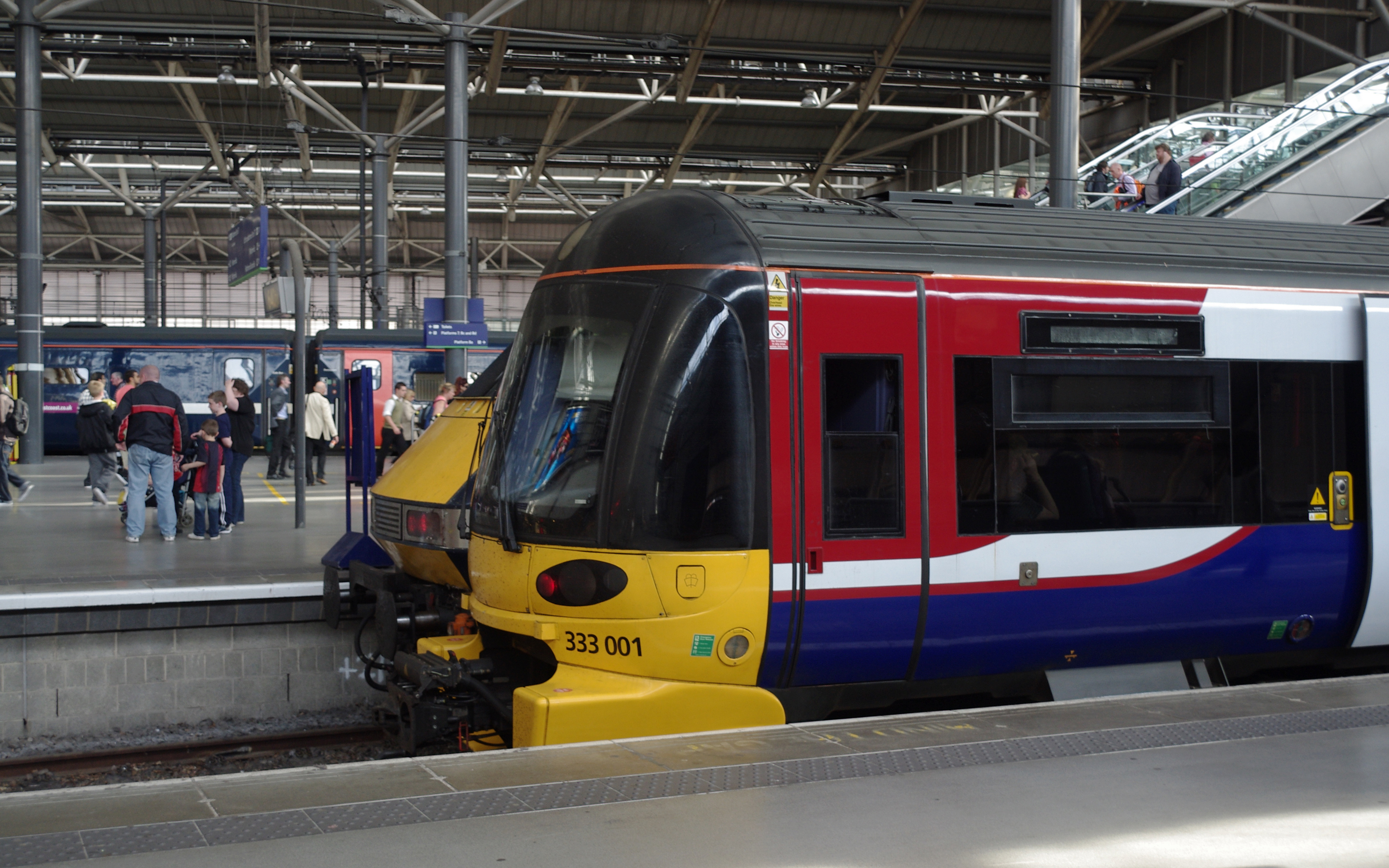
Leeds railway station

The West Yorkshire Metro oversees Northern suburban trains on 11 lines connecting urban centres such as Leeds, Bradford, Wakefield and Huddersfield and small commuter towns and villages in the Leeds city region, branded as Metro.

The network incorporates the following lines, which often continue to longer distance destinations:

- Airedale Line: Leeds/Bradford Forster Square – Skipton – Lancaster – Morecambe or Settle – Carlisle
- Caldervale Line: Leeds – Bradford Interchange – Halifax – Manchester Victoria or Blackpool North
- Hallam Line: Leeds – Castleford – Wakefield Kirkgate – Barnsley Interchange – Sheffield
- Harrogate Line:' Leeds – Harrogate – Knaresborough – York
  West Yorkshire network
- Huddersfield Line: Leeds or Wakefield Kirkgate – Huddersfield – Manchester Piccadilly – Manchester Airport or Liverpool Lime Street
- Leeds-Bradford Line: Leeds – Bradford Forster Square or Interchange (not a separate line, but a composite timetable of all Leeds to Bradford services on the Airedale and Calderdale Lines.)
- Penistone Line: Huddersfield – Barnsley Interchange – Sheffield
- Pontefract Line: Leeds or Wakefield – Pontefract Monkhill – Goole
- Wakefield Line: Leeds – Wakefield Westgate – Doncaster – Sheffield
- Wharfedale Line: Leeds or Bradford Forster Square – Ilkley
- York and Selby Lines: Leeds – Selby – York – Hull – Scarborough – Middlesbrough – Newcastle

== Manchester ==
Urban rail in Transport for Greater Manchester area

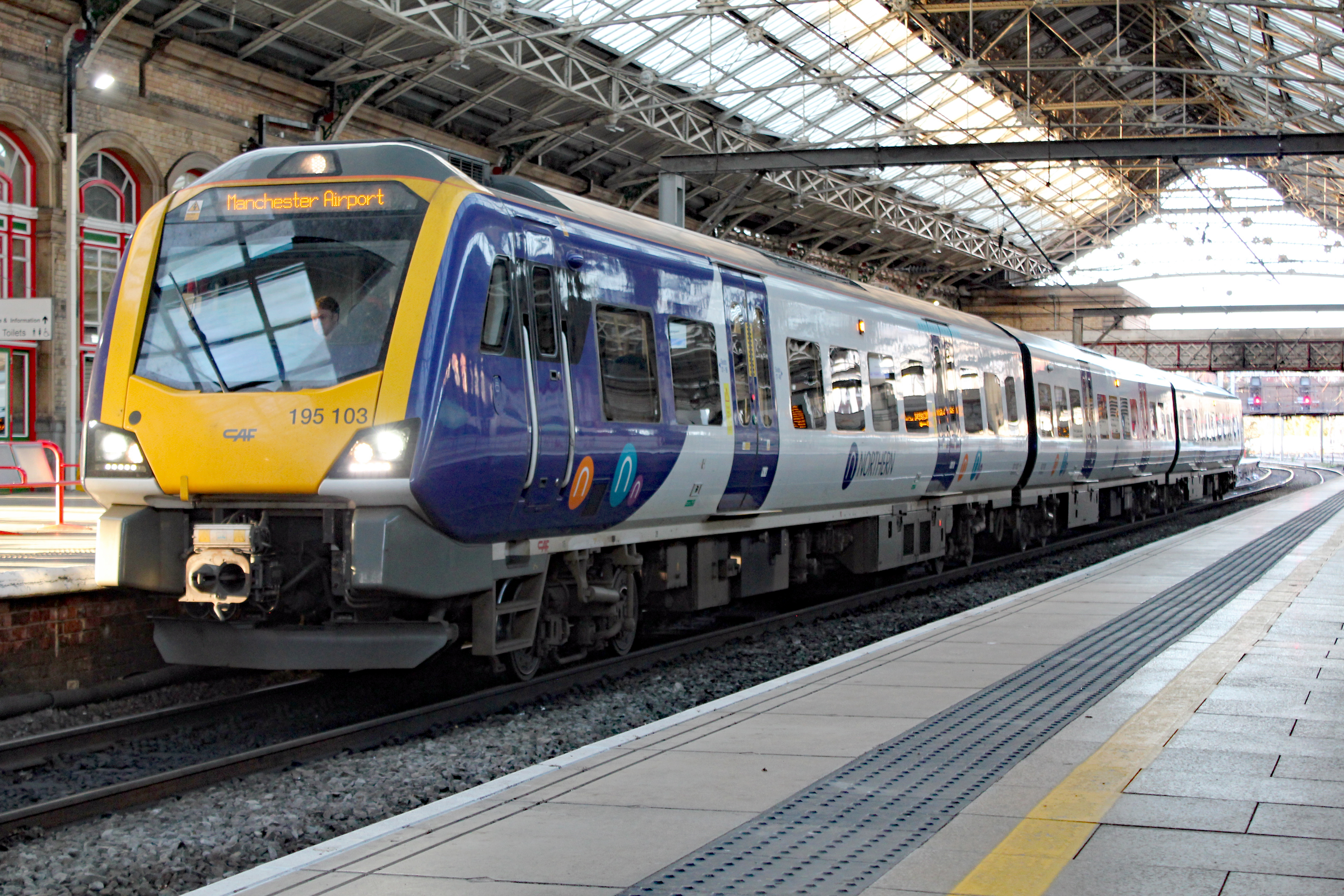
Northern Trains Class 195 at Preston.

Commuting via rail by wealthy merchants living in North Cheshire and South Lancashire into the centre of Manchester was a fairly early phenomenon thanks to the opening of railways such as the Liverpool and Manchester Railway, Sheffield, Ashton-under-Lyne and Manchester Railway, Manchester, South Junction and Altrincham Railway & Manchester, Sheffield and Lincolnshire Railway, in the 1830s & 1840s. All had stations in what were then the outskirts of Manchester, from where citizens could take a train into the centre of the city. Sale, Alderley Edge and Wilmslow are examples of early settlements that had railway stations in the early-mid-19th century and grew into sizable commuter towns.

Urban rail services to Manchester nowadays forms part of the Northern network.

Around 25 million journeys are made on the Greater Manchester local rail network, compared to 34 million Metrolink tram journeys. Buses make up a far bigger number than both however with 225 million journeys per year.

The biggest point of entry to the city is Manchester Piccadilly which accommodates 13 lines on which services are provided up to around every 15 minutes.

These include lines to/from Bolton, New Mills Central, Crewe, Liverpool Lime Street, Chester, Warrington Central, Hadfield / Glossop, Huddersfield and Southport.

There are also 11 routes from Manchester Victoria, all operated by Northern.

Routes are as follows:

- Buxton Line: Manchester Piccadilly – Stockport – Hazel Grove – Buxton
- Calder Valley Line: Manchester Victoria – Rochdale – Blackburn / Leeds
- Crewe to Manchester Line: Manchester Piccadilly – Stockport / Manchester Airport – Wilmslow – Crewe
- Glossop Line: Manchester Piccadilly – Guide Bridge – Glossop – Hadfield
- Hope Valley Line: Manchester Piccadilly – Guide Bridge – Romiley – Rose Hill Marple / Marple / Stockport – Hazel Grove – Chinley – Sheffield
- Huddersfield Line: Manchester Victoria – Ashton-under-Lyne – Stalybridge – Huddersfield
- Manchester–Liverpool Lines: Manchester Piccadilly – Warrington Central - Liverpool South Parkway – Liverpool Lime Street / Manchester Victoria – Earlestown – Liverpool Lime Street
- Manchester to Preston Line: Manchester Piccadilly & Victoria – Salford Crescent – Bolton – Preston
- Manchester to Southport Line: Manchester Piccadilly & Victoria – Salford Crescent – Wigan Wallgate – Southport
- Mid-Cheshire Line: Manchester Piccadilly – Stockport – Altrincham – Chester
- Ribble Valley Line: Manchester Victoria – Bolton – Darwen – Blackburn – Clitheroe

91 stations are within the Greater Manchester ticketing zone. There are links to the Metrolink tram network at Manchester Piccadilly, Manchester Victoria, Manchester Deansgate, Altrincham, Navigation Road, Eccles (400m walk), Rochdale, Ashton-under-Lyne (from 2013), East Didsbury (200m walk) and Manchester Airport. Tickets bought for rail travel within Greater Manchester ticketing zone to the four city centre stations (Deansgate, Oxford Road, Victoria and Piccadilly) are to "Manchester Central Zone", rendered on the ticket as "MANCHESTER CTLZ", and allow free tram travel within the Metrolink tram city fare zone (eight stops within the Piccadilly–Victoria–Deansgate station triangle).

Transport for Greater Manchester coordinates rail services within Greater Manchester. It was established in 1969 as the SELNEC PTE (South East Lancashire North East Cheshire) following the Transport Act 1968, and was renamed the Greater Manchester Passenger Transport Executive in 1974 before becoming TfGM in 2011.

== Greater London ==
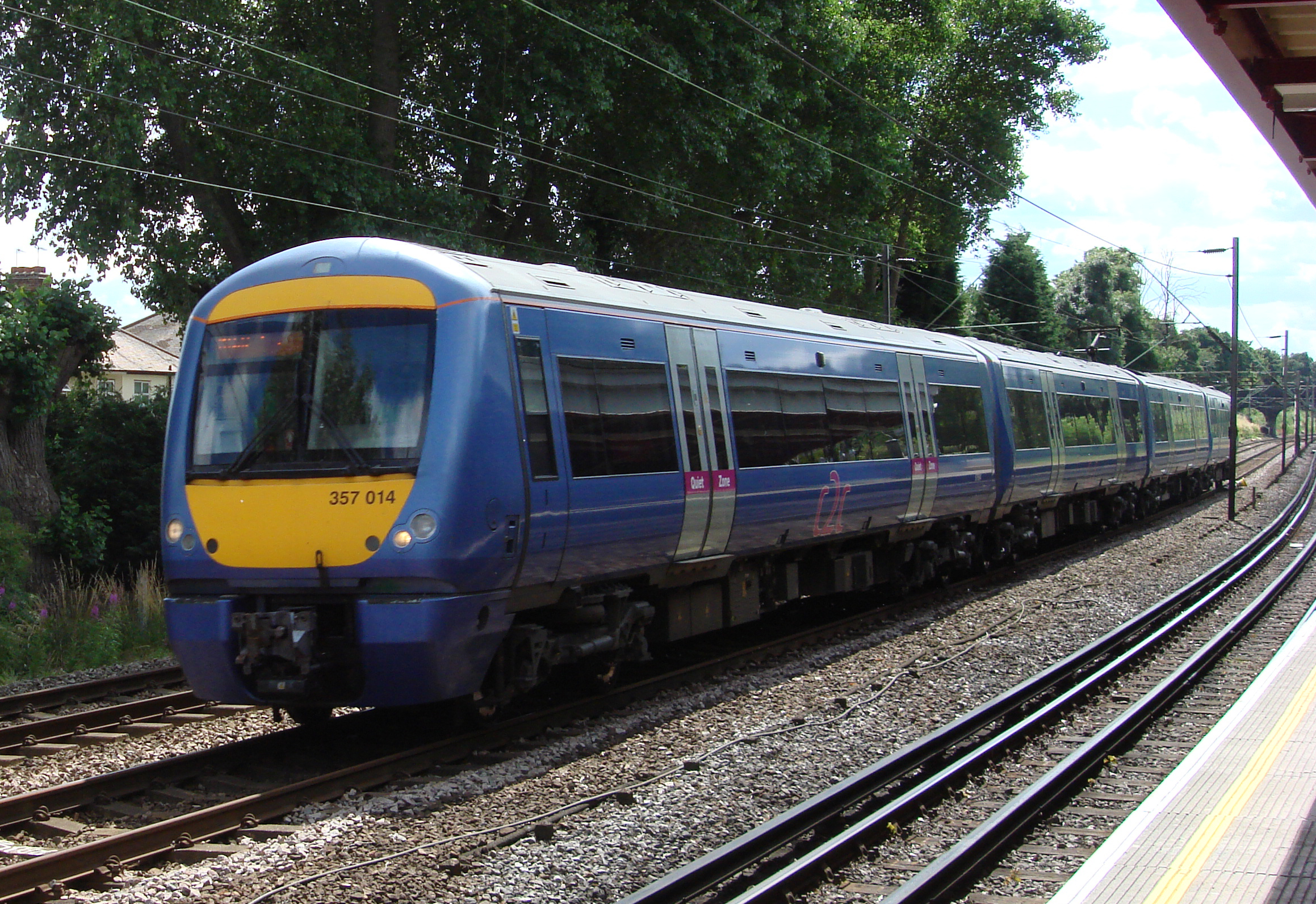
c2c train bypassing Upminster Bridge

The London railway, underground, light rail and tram network, with those services every 10 minutes or less in red

The London network comprised 368 railway stations within the London fare zones. Stations in London are within London fare zones. Some stations outside Greater London, for example Chigwell in Essex, are within zones 4–6; many stations outside London are within zones 6–9, for example Amersham and Shenfield, but some stations much closer to the Greater London boundary, like Esher and Staines, are not in any zone. London has an integrated ticketing system via the Travelcard, Oyster card, or contactless payment for buses, Docklands Light Railway, suburban rail, tram, Underground, and Overground.

Unlike cities like Liverpool, Sydney and Paris, several operators provide suburban rail services, but all are part of the National Rail system and ticketing is integrated. Some operators have government contracts but others, such as Southeastern, are owned by the state. Most stations are served at least every 20 minutes, with many stations and routes having four, six or more trains per hour. Importantly, TfL exhibit a long term ambition to bring many of these separately-operated suburban lines under their control, specifically those which terminate nearer the Greater London boundary. They state that TfL control of these lines will increase service frequency and capacity, as well as homogenise service patterns across differently-operated lines. Current lines within south-and south-east London are set to be prioritised, considering the currently low levels of service frequency experienced here compared to other parts of London.

=== c2c ===
c2c runs from London Fenchurch Street through east London via Basildon (or Grays and Tilbury) to Southend Central and Shoeburyness, serving eight stations in Greater London.

=== Chiltern Railways ===
Chiltern Railways operate from Marylebone railway station, heading out of the capital along an approximate west-northwest axis. Four commuter routes are run by the operator, each terminating at Aylesbury, Aylesbury Vale Parkway, Oxford and High Wycombe, typically served by one train per hour. Eight stations within London are served by the operator, including Sudbury & Harrow Road, London's least used station, which has no services outside peak hours or at weekends.

There is a proposal for a Chiltern Metro Service between Marylebone and West Ruislip, operating at 4+ trains per hour, stopping at Wembley Stadium, Sudbury & Harrow Road, Sudbury Hill Harrow, Northolt Park, South Ruislip and West Ruislip. This would require a reversing facility at West Ruislip, and passing loops at Sudbury Hill Harrow and Wembley Stadium (part of the old down fast line is in use as a central reversing siding for stock movements and eight-car shuttles for stadium events).

=== Thameslink and Great Northern ===
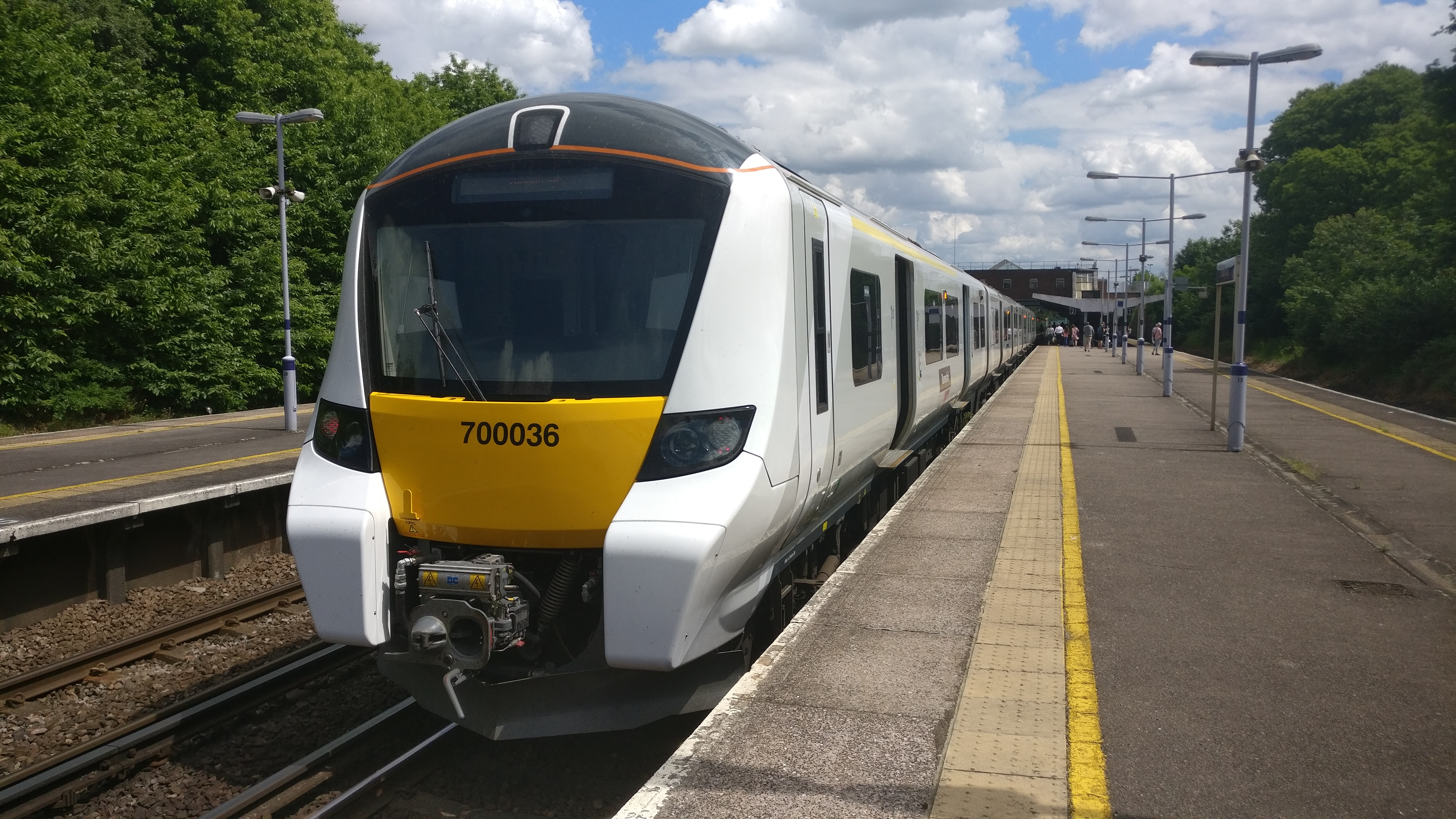
Thameslink Class 700 at St Mary Cray

The Thameslink and Great Northern network extends from Brighton to Bedford and from central London to Norfolk. Thameslink and Great Northern run two distinct services, Great Northern and Thameslink. The Great Northern route runs from King's Cross and Moorgate. Suburban services serve stations such as Alexandra Palace, Enfield Chase and Oakleigh Park. Stations within London have three or six trains per hour, but stations on the Northern City branch were not served on weekends until December 2015.

The Thameslink route underwent a major upgrade which was completed in 2020. Trains run from Bedford and Cambridge to Brighton and from Luton to Sutton. The network links Luton Airport, St Pancras (for Eurostar services) and Gatwick Airport and London Blackfriars, London Bridge and Wimbledon. Stations in the north of London and some south London suburbs are served every 15 minutes, while stations in central London are served every 15 minutes for each service. Stations on the Wimbledon Loop Line are served every 30 minutes.

=== Greater Anglia ===
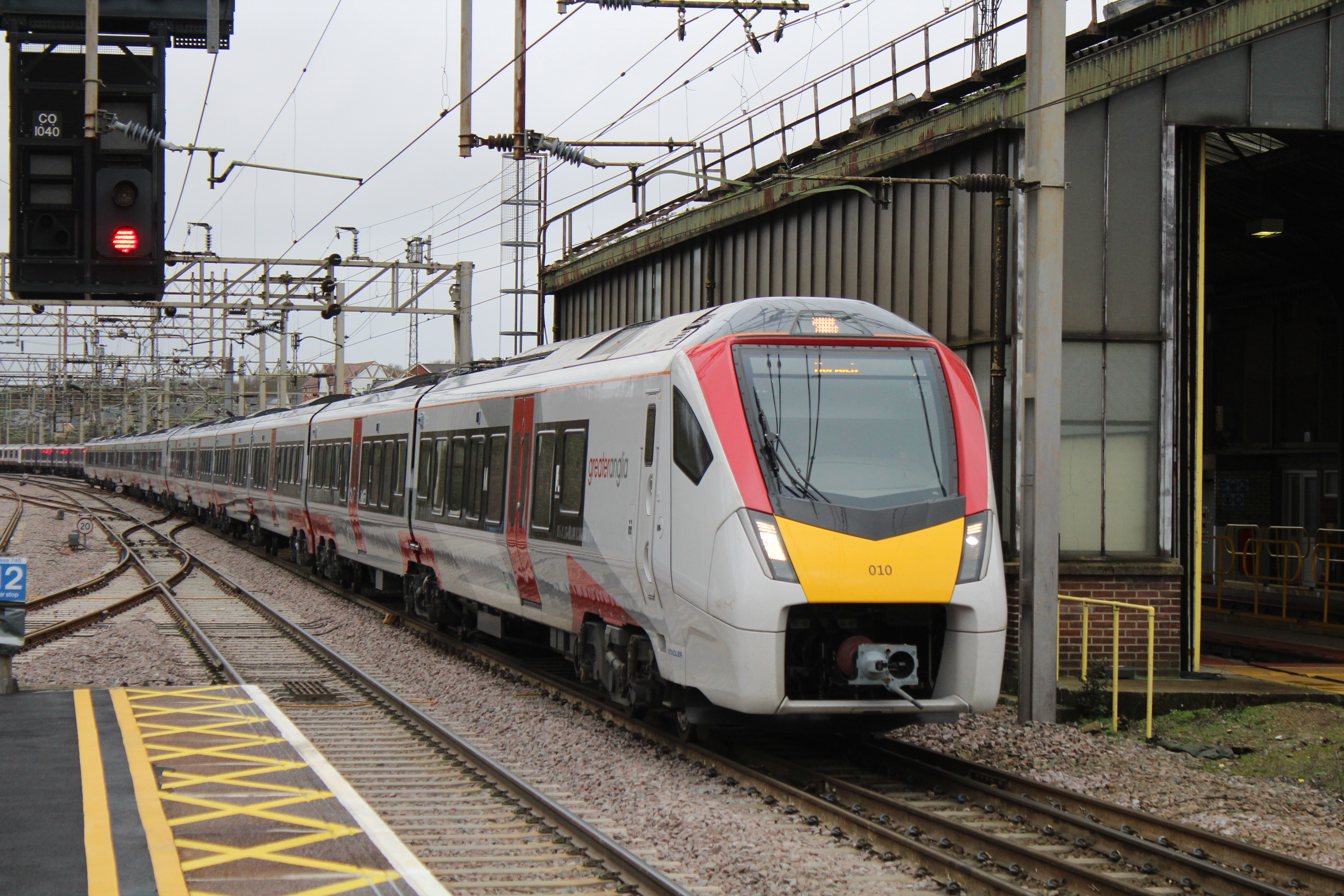
Greater Anglia Class 745 at Colchester

Greater Anglia operates frequent services from Southend Victoria, Ipswich, Clacton-on-Sea and Braintree to Liverpool Street station throughout the day along the Great Eastern Main Line, as well as from Southminster, Walton-on-the-Naze and Harwich Town during the peak hours.

On the West Anglia and Lea Valley lines Greater Anglia run services from Liverpool Street to Hertford East via Tottenham Hale and from Stratford via Tottenham Hale to Bishops Stortford. The Stansted Express links London to Stansted Airport and calls at Tottenham Hale.

=== Great Western Railway ===
Great Western Railway operates from Paddington and Greenford, and connecting London to Slough, Reading and Oxford. Great Western Railway also operate services to South Wales and Western England. Stations within London are served by two or four trains per hour.

=== London Overground ===
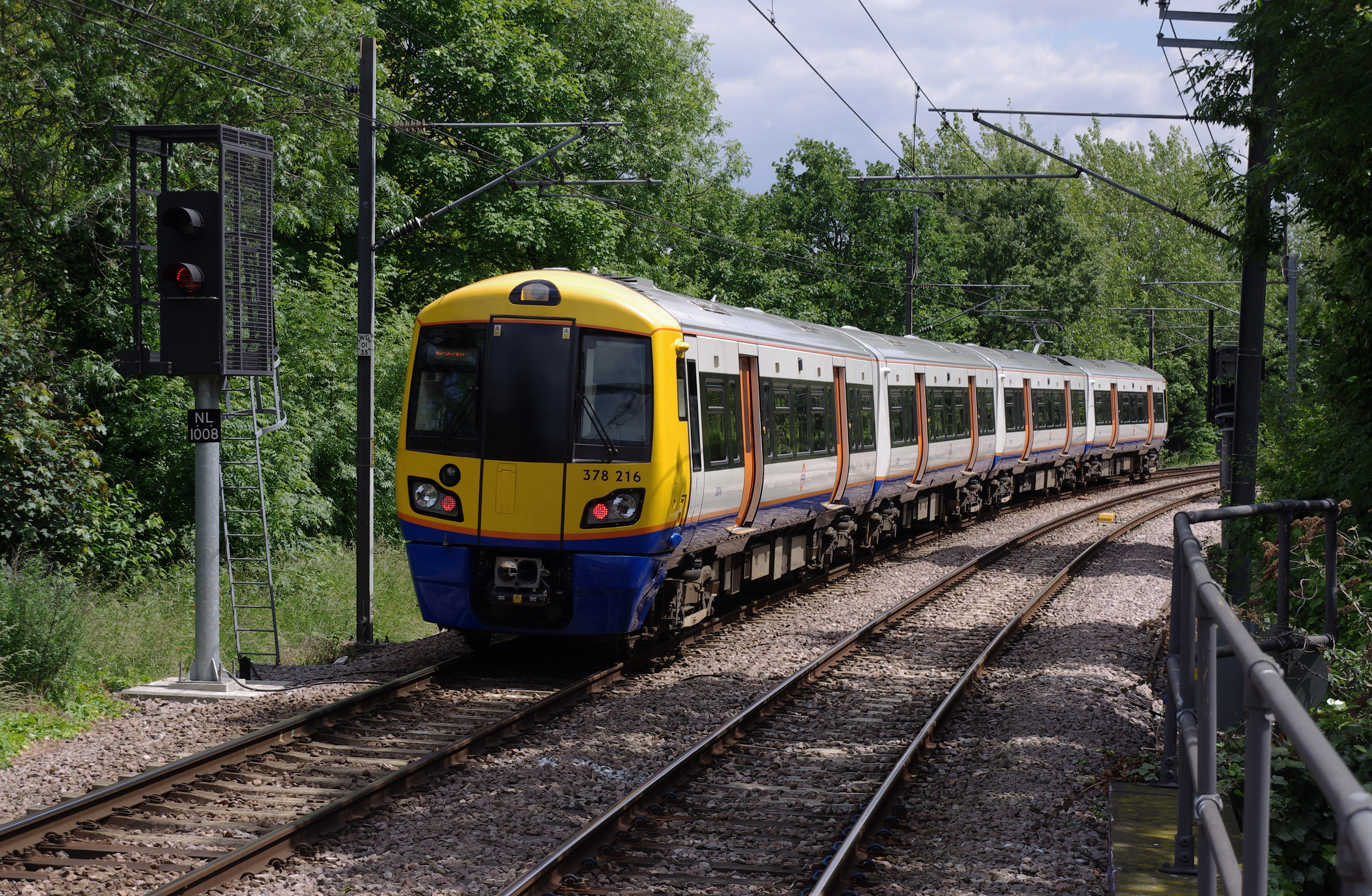
London Overground Class 378 at Gospel Oak

The London Overground is operated by First Rail London under a concession let by Transport for London. The Overground includes the Lioness, Mildmay, Windrush, Weaver, Liberty and the Suffragette lines. It is one of the three National Rail service shown on the London Underground map, the other two being Elizabeth line and Thameslink. All stations are served at least every 30 minutes, with stations between Dalston Junction and Surrey Quays on the Windrush line having 16 trains per hour in each direction.

On the Weaver lines, four trains per hour go to Chingford and four via Edmonton Green, with two continuing to Enfield Town or Cheshunt.

=== London North Western Railway ===
West Midlands Trains services that run along the West Coast Main Line operate under the London Northwestern Railway brand, some of which connect London with commuter towns to its northwest. These include three two-train-per-hour-services heading out of London Euston, which terminate at Tring, Milton Keynes Central and Birmingham New Street. The services are semi-fast in nature; Harrow & Wealdstone is first stop served by the operator following Euston. Other major intermediate destinations on some or all of the routes include Watford, Leighton Buzzard, and Hemel Hempstead. Following an initial rollout on the Tring and Milton Keynes commuter services, Class 730 electric trains are expected to be introduced across the entire London Northwestern Railway network by the end of 2025.

=== Southeastern ===
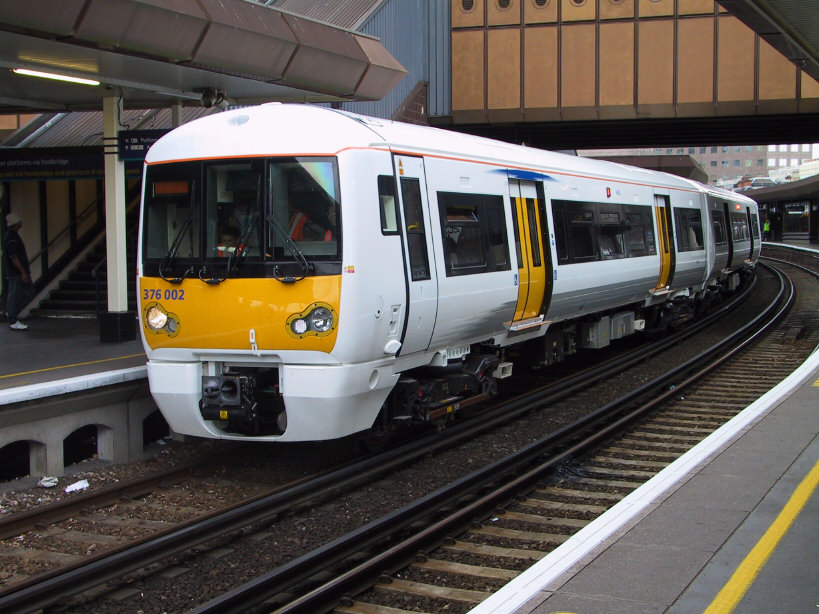
Southeastern Class 376 at London Bridge

Southeastern operates over a large network in south-east London, with services reaching Kent and parts of East Sussex, covering 741 km (460 mi) of railway. Its London termini are Charing Cross, Victoria, Blackfriars, Cannon Street, London Bridge and St Pancras. Southeastern provides most of its stations with a frequency of 4–6 trains per hour. Stations on the Bromley North Line are served every 20 minutes.

=== Southern ===
Southern provides services in South London and between Central London and the South Coast, through East and West Sussex and Surrey, and parts of Kent and Hampshire. Southern manages 167 stations and operates up to every 15 minutes on 14 lines south from London Victoria via Clapham Junction, and 10 from London Bridge. All Southern stations in the London London fare zones are served at least every 30 minutes during the working week with stations on the Tattenham corner line only receiving a train every hour on Sundays.

=== South Western Railway ===
South Western Railway (SWR) operates a suburban network out of London Waterloo via Clapham Junction, which covers as far as Windsor, Reading, Alton, Guildford and Dorking.

The SWR network is the busiest in the UK, serving the busiest railway stations in terms of passenger numbers (Waterloo) and in terms of trains per hour (Clapham Junction). All SWR stations in the suburban network (apart from Fulwell, Hampton, Berrylands, Thames Ditton, Hampton Court, Strawberry Hill and those on the Chessington Branch) have at least four trains per hour. Earlsfield is served by 16 trains per hour, while Vauxhall is served by 26 trains per hour.

SWR also operates longer distance services as far as Weymouth, Portsmouth, Southampton, Bournemouth and Exeter. As part of its contract, SWR also operates the 8.5 mile Island Line on the Isle of Wight, with services between Ryde Pier Head and Shanklin.

=== Elizabeth line ===
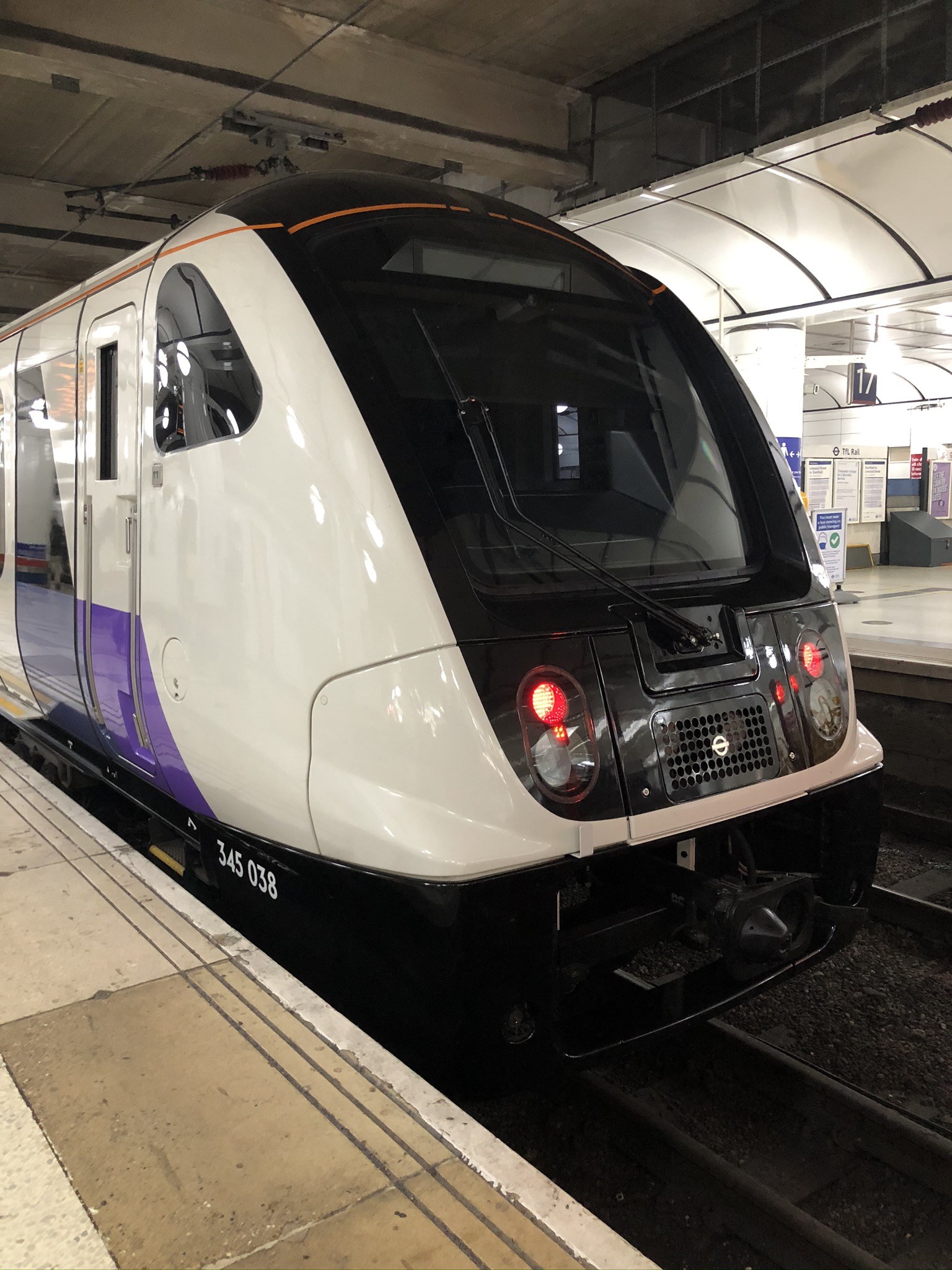
Elizabeth Line Class 345 at London Liverpool Street in 2020

A few years before the central section of the Elizabeth line opened, Transport for London (TfL) began to operate services on pre-existing track, such as Liverpool Street to Shenfield and Gidea Park and Paddington to Hayes and Harlington and Heathrow Terminal 4. These effectively replaced services run by Greater Anglia and Great Western Railway (GWR). When the central tunnel opened, TfL Rail was renamed Elizabeth line and continue to serve Liverpool Street and Shenfield as well Paddington to Heathrow via Central London

== Largest networks outside London ==
This is a list of the largest urban rail networks in the United Kingdom outside London. London's suburban rail network has several operators and over 500 stations on many different lines.

City	Number of	
City	Lines	Stations
Glasgow	13	179
Manchester	11	91
Cardiff	8	81
Leeds	12	78
Birmingham	11	75
Liverpool	3	89
Exeter	5	40
Edinburgh	4	40
Belfast	3	39
Bristol	3	26

== See also ==
- Commuting
- List of guided busways and BRT systems in the United Kingdom
- List of modern tramway and light rail systems in the United Kingdom
- List of suburban and commuter rail systems
- Public transport
- Rail transport in Great Britain
- Rapid transit in the United Kingdom
