= Widney Manor railway station =

Railway station in the West Midlands, England

Coordinates: 52.396°N 1.774°W

Widney Manor
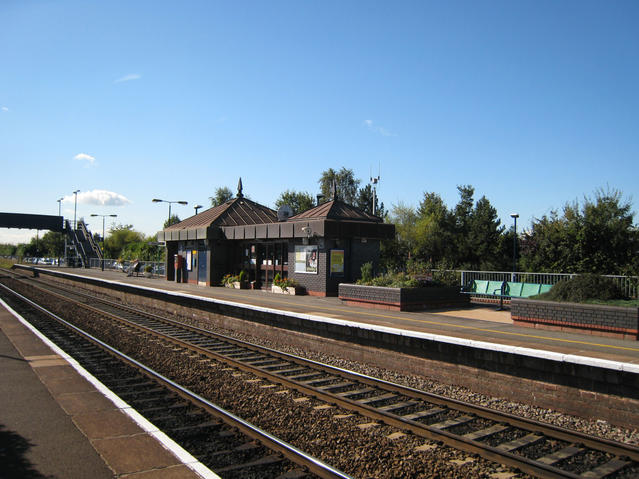

General information
- Location: Widney Manor, Metropolitan Borough of Solihull; England
- Grid reference: SP154775
- Manager: West Midlands Trains
- Transit authority: Transport for West Midlands
- Platforms: 2

Other information
- Station code: WMR
- Fare zone: 4
- Classification: DfT category E

History
- Opened: 1899

Passengers
- 2021/22: ▲0.177 million
- 2022/23: ▲0.241 million
- 2023/24: ▲0.286 million
- 2024/25: ▲0.346 million
- 2025/26: ▲0.374 million
Location
Notes
- Passenger statistics from the Office of Rail and Road

Widney Manor railway station serves the Widney Manor area of the town of Solihull in the West Midlands of England. The station is served by West Midlands Trains (who manage the station). A significant portion of the car park occupies what used to be the formation when the line was four tracks wide and the former GWR London Paddington - Birkenhead Woodside service passed through the station but did not stop. This service ceased with the electrification of the former LMS line from London Euston to Birmingham New Street in 1967.

== Services ==
The station is served by two trains per hour in each direction between Birmingham Snow Hill and Dorridge (hourly on Sundays). The Birmingham trains continue to either Stourbridge Junction, Kidderminster or Worcester Shrub Hill/Foregate Street. One Dorridge service per hour continues to Stratford-upon-Avon and in peak hours some services extend to Leamington Spa. Chiltern used to provide a limited service at the station in the late evening.

Preceding station	National Rail	Following station
Solihull	West Midlands Railway; Leamington-Worcester	Dorridge
