= Widney Manor =

Suburb of Solihull, West Midlands, England

Coordinates: 52.396°N 1.774°W

Widney Manor is a suburb of the town of Solihull in the West Midlands of England. The history of Widney Manor goes back to the 13th century. In 1878, Widney Manor was one of the first suburbs of Birmingham laid out for the construction of villa residences for wealthy residents.

The area is served by Widney Manor railway station, a golf course and health club.
