= Solihull railway station =

Railway station in the West Midlands, England

Coordinates: 52°24′53″N 1°47′20″W

Solihull
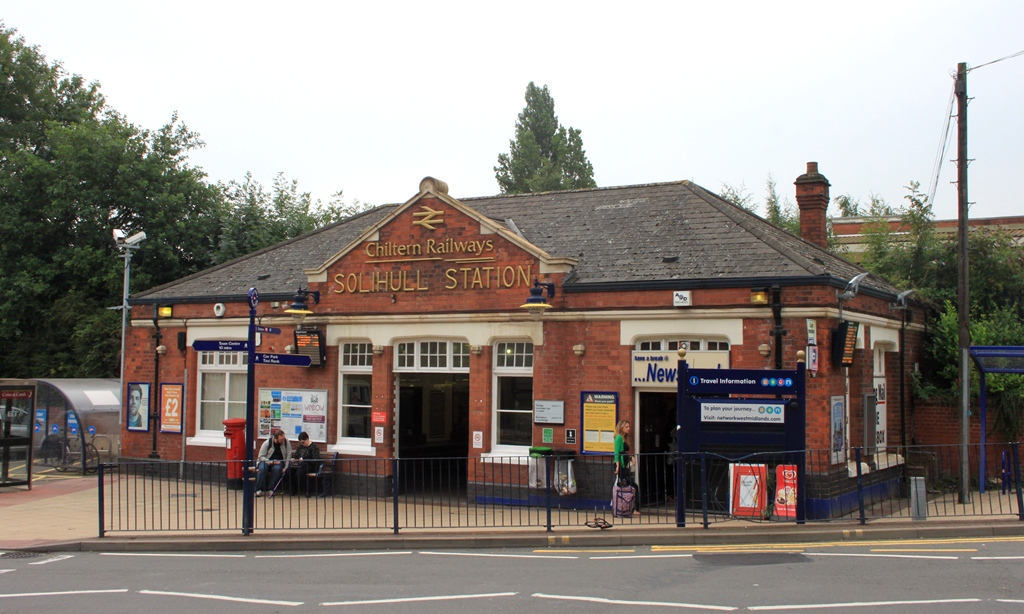

General information
- Location: Solihull, Metropolitan Borough of Solihull; England
- Grid reference: SP144796
- Manager: Chiltern Railways
- Transit authority: Transport for West Midlands
- Platforms: 2

Other information
- Station code: SOL
- Fare zone: 4
- Classification: DfT category D

History
- Opened: 1852

Passengers
- 2021/22: ▲1.038 million
- 2022/23: ▲1.341 million
- 2023/24: ▲1.581 million
- 2024/25: ▲1.899 million
- 2025/26: ▲2.092 million
Location
Notes
- Passenger statistics from the Office of Rail and Road

Solihull railway station serves the market town of Solihull in the West Midlands of England. The station is served by West Midlands Trains and Chiltern Railways.

The station booking office is located in a ground level building at the front of the station, from here there is a subway where footsteps and a lift lead up to the island platform. Services are operated by Chiltern Railways to London Marylebone via High Wycombe, West Midlands Trains to Dorridge, with some services extending to Leamington Spa in the evening peak. The vast majority of Chiltern Railways services terminate at Birmingham Snow Hill or Birmingham Moor Street, with extensions to Stourbridge Junction at peak times. West Midlands Trains operate services to Stourbridge Junction on a 30-minute frequency.

== History ==
The original Solihull station was opened in 1852, by the Great Western Railway on its London Paddington to Birmingham and Birkenhead main line. In the early 1930s, the line between Olton and Lapworth was quadrupled, and the station was rebuilt slightly south of the original. The rebuilt station had two island platforms.

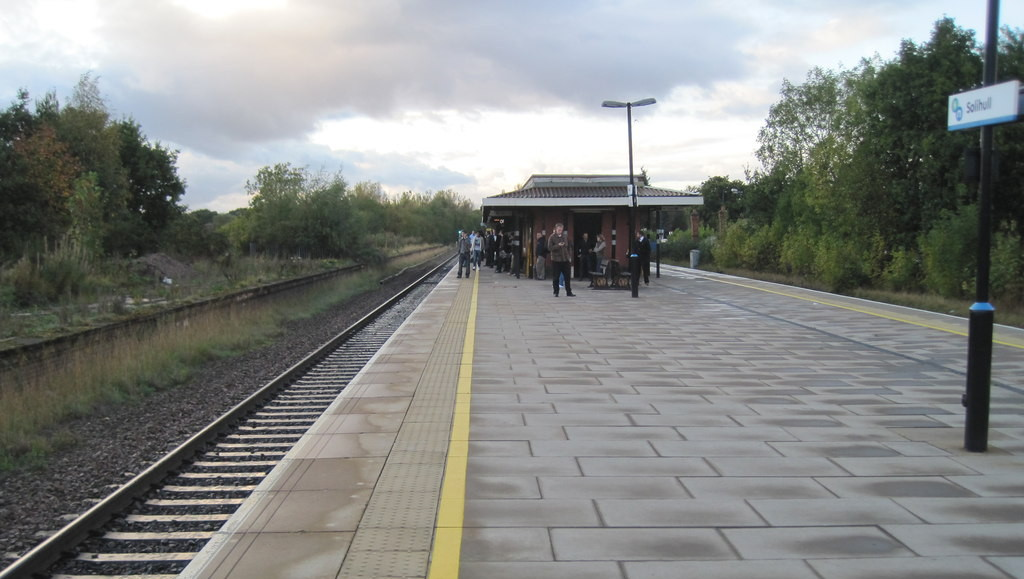
The station's remaining island platform and building. The disused island platform is to the left.

The line and station underwent significant rationalisation in the 1960s and 70s. One island platform was taken out of use when the line was reduced back to double track, the overgrown remains of the disused platform can still be seen. The station also lost its original canopies, and platform buildings, being reduced to a single platform building. Platform canopies were constructed once again in 2007-08, but not to the former GWR scale.

Until 1967 the former GWR London Paddington - Birkenhead Woodside train services passed through the station but few stopped there; these services ceased with the electrification of the former LMS line from London Euston to Birmingham New Street. Virgin CrossCountry services called at the station until May 2003.

Recent investment by Chiltern Railways has seen rail times into London reduced to under 90 minutes - trains now travel along the line at 100 miles per hour (160 km/h). Some recent renovations under the auspices of Chiltern Railways has seen the replacement of the station signage with gilt signage inspired by that used by the Great Western Railway.

== Facilities ==
The ticket office is staffed throughout the day, seven days per week whilst a self-service ticket machine is also provided on the concourse (this can be used to collect pre-paid tickets). A coffee shop, waiting room and toilets are located at platform level, with the platform and subway connected by stairs and lift (the station is therefore fully accessible for disabled passengers). Train running information is offered via a help point, CIS screens, automated announcements and timetable posters.

Most bus services to Solihull town centre terminate or call at stops outside the station building.

== Services ==
West Midlands Railway:

West Midlands Trains run local services every 30 minutes as part of the Snow Hill lines:

The off-peak service pattern Mondays to Saturdays is as follows:

- 2 trains per hour westbound to Birmingham Snow Hill, continuing to Worcester Foregate Street and/or Worcester Shrub Hill via Smethwick Galton Bridge, Stourbridge Junction, Kidderminster and Droitwich Spa
- 2 trains per hour eastbound to Dorridge via Widney Manor, one of which continues to Stratford-upon-Avon. Two evening services extend to Leamington Spa via Warwick.

On Sundays, there is an hourly service between Dorridge & Stourbridge Junction.

Chiltern Railways:

Chiltern run half-hourly services between Birmingham and London on the Chiltern Main Line. Service patterns Mondays to Saturdays off-peak are as follows:

- 2 trains per hour to either Birmingham Moor Street or Birmingham Snow Hill. 2 or 3 trains in the evening peak extend to Stourbridge Junction. The peak hour extensions ran to/from Kidderminster from September 2002 to May 2023.
- 2 trains per hour to London Marylebone via Leamington Spa and Banbury
- A two-hourly service to Leamington Spa via Lapworth and Warwick operates on weekdays only

Sunday Chiltern services are hourly off-peak running between Moor Street and Marylebone, with additional services to London in the morning peak and two additional services in the evening terminating at Stourbridge Junction.

Preceding station	National Rail	Following station
Birmingham Moor Street	Chiltern Railways; Birmingham-London	Dorridge
Birmingham Moor Street	Chiltern Railways; Birmingham-Leamington	Dorridge
Olton	West Midlands Railway; Worcester-Birmingham-Dorridge-Stratford; Snow Hill Lines	Widney Manor
Olton	West Midlands Railway; Worcester-Leamington	Widney Manor
