= Snow Hill lines =

Railway lines in West Midlands, England

Diagrammatic map of the Snow Hill Lines (not to scale)

The Snow Hill Lines is the collective name for the railway lines running through Birmingham Snow Hill and Birmingham Moor Street stations in Birmingham, England. They form an important part of the suburban rail network of Birmingham, Warwickshire and Worcestershire. All other lines to/through Birmingham use Birmingham New Street station. The Snow Hill lines carry around 20% of the daily rail services into Birmingham; the remainder use New Street.

Historically, the lines running through Snow Hill station were built by the Great Western Railway, and so they are largely separate from the lines running into New Street station, which were built by the London and North Western Railway and Midland Railway.

The original Snow Hill station was closed in 1972. The Snow Hill lines in their present form came into being between 1987 and 1995, when Snow Hill station, and the line through to Smethwick was reopened, in order to create a new cross-city rail service via Snow Hill and Moor Street stations. The former line to Wolverhampton was reopened as the Midland Metro tram line in 1999.

== Lines ==
The three Snow Hill lines are:

=== Birmingham to Worcester via Kidderminster Line ===
This is a commuter line to Worcester Shrub Hill and Worcester Foregate Street via Stourbridge Junction and Kidderminster. It was reopened to Snow Hill in 1995 as part of the "Jewellery Line" project.

=== Chiltern Main Line ===
This is a regional main line with services to London Marylebone. In the West Midlands it is one of the Snow Hill Lines, as it also carries a frequent commuter service between Snow Hill and Solihull, Dorridge and Leamington Spa.

=== North Warwickshire Line (a.k.a. 'Shakespeare Line') ===
This is a commuter branch line, which branches off from the Chiltern Main Line at Tyseley and runs south to Stratford-upon-Avon. The line was formerly a through main line running south to Cheltenham, but has been a dead end branch since the 1970s. Frequent commuter services run as far as Whitlocks End, with a less frequent service running to Stratford. A spur line from Hatton allows some services to run via Solihull.

== Rolling stock and operators ==
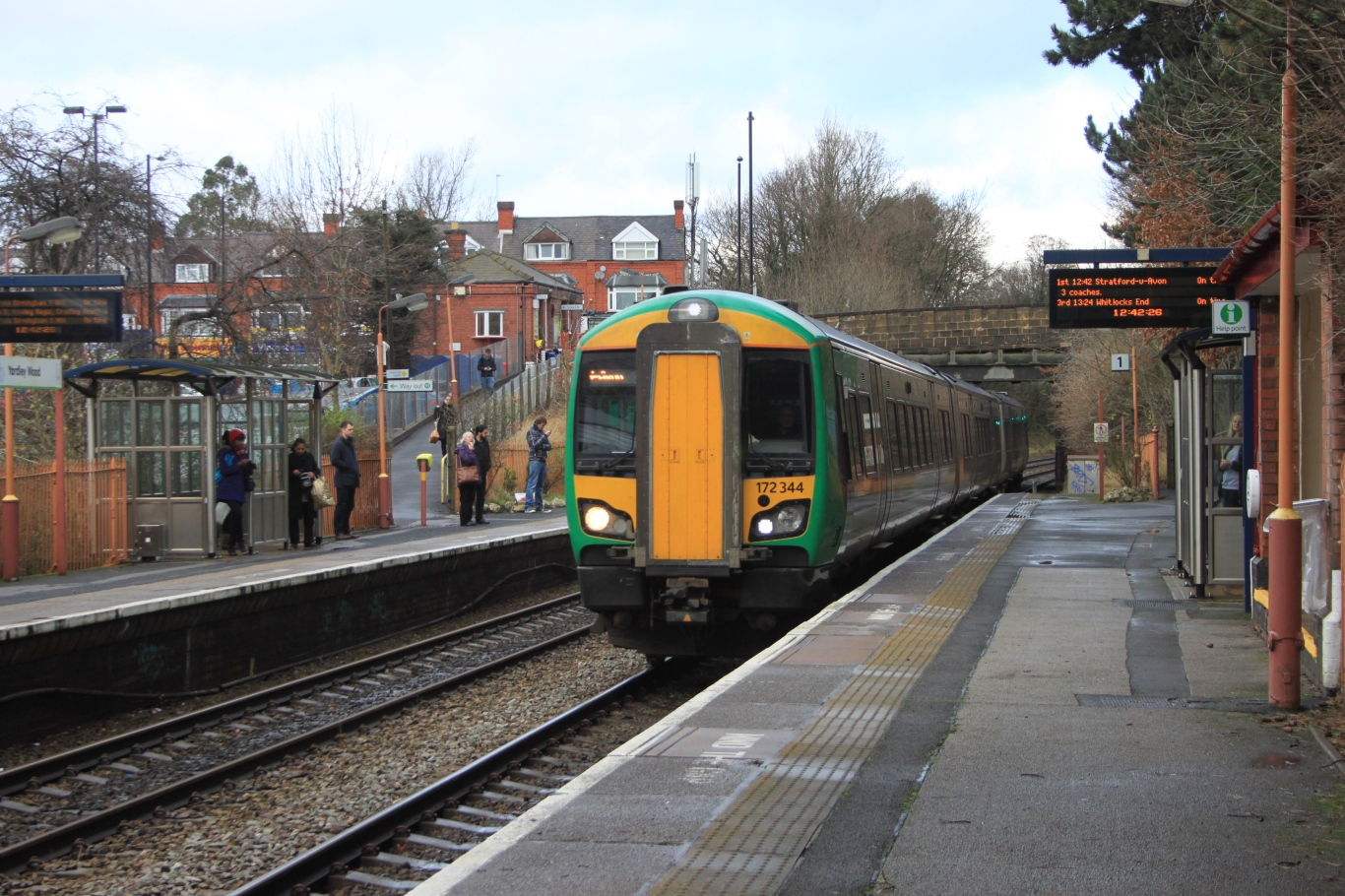
London Midland Class 172 calls at Yardley Wood

Unlike the lines to/through New Street station, the lines are not electrified, and are operated by diesel multiple units. West Midlands Railway, who operate the local services on the routes, mainly use Class 172 DMUs. These replaced the older Class 150 in 2011. Chiltern Railways use Class 165 and Class 168 diesel multiple units, and Class 68 locomotives with Mark 5A coaches. However, electrification is a future aspiration of Network Rail and Chiltern Railways.

=== Services ===
==== West Midlands Railway ====
The local services on the Snow Hill Lines are closely integrated. As of 2023, West Midlands Railway run four trains per hour between Kidderminster, Birmingham Snow Hill, and Birmingham Moor Street.

The typical weekday service has two services per hour running eastbound to Dorridge and the other two to Whitlocks End. One of each eastbound service per hour continues to Stratford-upon-Avon, and some evening trains continue beyond Dorridge to Leamington Spa. Westbound, two trains per hour usually continue beyond Stourbridge Junction and Kidderminster continue to Worcester Foregate Street and/or Worcester Shrub Hill.

==== Chiltern Railways ====
Chiltern Railways run two trains per hour from either Snow Hill or Moor Street to London Marylebone calling at Solihull and Leamington Spa. Chiltern Railways also run a two-hourly local service from Moor Street to Leamington. In peak hours some Chiltern services to or from London continue to Stourbridge Junction.

== West Midlands Metro ==
The West Midlands Metro runs into Snow Hill, but it is not considered one of the Snow Hill Lines as it is a light rail/tram line. However it runs mostly along the trackbed of the former Birmingham Snow Hill to Wolverhampton Low Level Line.

== Future ==
In October 2018, as part of a 30-year strategy of Transport in the West Midlands several interventions were proposed between 2018 and 2047. By 2026 it was proposed that trains would be lengthened, improvements to evening services (from May 2019), investigations of a case to extend services to Brierley Hill and West Midland Safari Park and reopening platform 4 at Snow Hill. By 2034, it was proposed that Birmingham to Rowley Regis, Dorridge, Whitlocks End and Stratford upon Avon services would be increased which would see a new turn back facilities at Rowley Regis and capacity interventions at Moor Street and Snow Hill. Beyond 2034, it was proposed that there may be capacity improvements between Leamington Spa and Birmingham, a new semi-fast service between Birmingham and Oxford via Solihull, local service frequency increases and Safari Park service increases.

== See also ==
- Transport in Birmingham
- Urban rail in the United Kingdom
- Honeybourne Line
