= Dorridge railway station =

Railway station in the West Midlands, England

Coordinates: 52.372°N 1.753°W

Dorridge
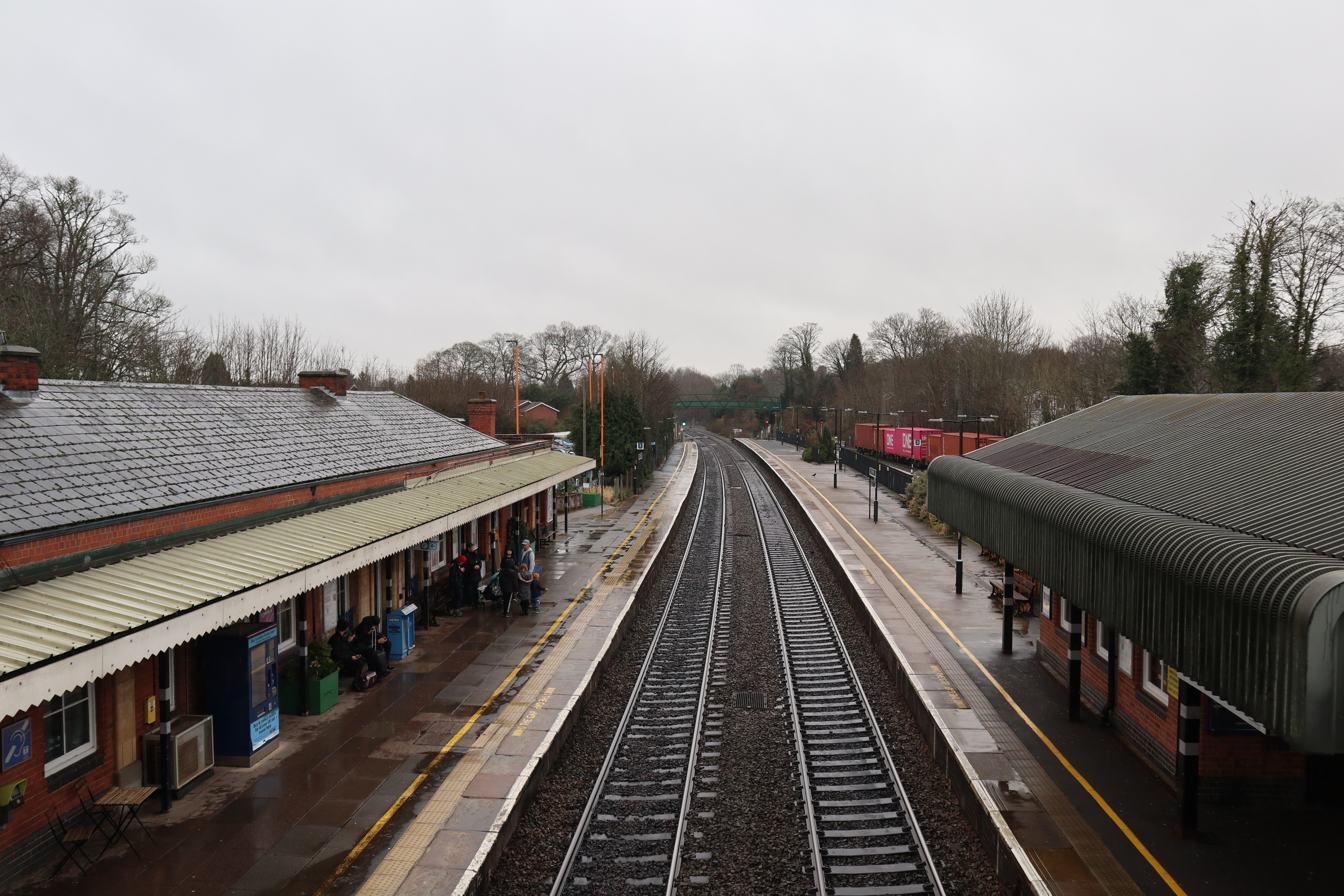

General information
- Location: Dorridge, Metropolitan Borough of Solihull; England
- Grid reference: SP169748
- Manager: Chiltern Railways
- Transit authority: Transport for West Midlands
- Platforms: 3

Other information
- Station code: DDG
- Fare zone: 5
- Classification: DfT category E

History
- Opened: 1852

Passengers
- 2021/22: ▲0.465 million
- 2022/23: ▲0.575 million
- 2023/24: ▲0.668 million
- 2024/25: ▲0.825 million
- 2025/26: ▲0.905 million
Location
Notes
- Passenger statistics from the Office of Rail and Road

Dorridge railway station is in the large village Dorridge in the West Midlands of England. The station is served by Chiltern Railways, who manage the station, and also by West Midlands Trains. It is situated 10 1/2 miles (16.9 km) south of Birmingham Snow Hill.

== History ==
The station was built by the Great Western Railway in 1852, on their line from Birmingham to Oxford. The station was formerly called Knowle and Dorridge, as it also serves the nearby village Knowle. Prior to electrification of the former LMS line from London Euston to Birmingham New Street the former GWR London Paddington-Birkenhead Woodside trains passed through the station but did not stop.

The station was renamed from Knowle to Dorridge on 6 May 1974.

== Facilities ==
There is a self-service ticket machine installed outside the main building on platform 1 for use outside times that the station is staffed. Other amenities include a coffee shop, toilets and bicycle rack on platform 1 and a waiting room on platforms 2 and 3. Train running information is provided via automated announcements, timetable posters and CIS screens. All three platforms have step-free access (platforms 2 & 3 via lifts built into the footbridge).

== Services and Platforms ==
=== Services ===
Dorridge station is served by trains operated by Chiltern Railways and West Midlands Railway.

The current off peak weekday service in trains per hour is:

Chiltern Railways:

Southbound:

- 1tp2h to Leamington Spa via Warwick
- 2tph to London Marylebone via Leamington Spa and Banbury

Northbound:

- 2tph to Birmingham Moor Street via Solihull
  - 1tph of which extends to Birmingham Snow Hill

West Midlands Railway:

West Midlands Trains serve the station with services every 30 minutes in each direction on the Snow Hill Lines.

- 2 tph westbound to Worcester Foregate Street and/or Worcester Shrub Hill via Solihull, Snow Hill, Moor Street, Smethwick Galton Bridge, Stourbridge Junction, Kidderminster and Droitwich Spa
- 1 tph to Stratford-upon-Avon via Lapworth and Stratford-upon-Avon Parkway

2 West Midlands Railway services operate Monday to Friday evenings to Leamington Spa.

On Sundays there is an hourly service starting here running to/from Stourbridge Junction.

Preceding station	National Rail	Following station
Solihull	Chiltern Railways; Birmingham–London	Warwick Parkway
Solihull	Chiltern Railways; Birmingham–Leamington	Lapworth
Widney Manor	West Midlands Railway; Leamington/Stratford–Worcester; Snow Hill lines	Lapworth
Widney Manor	West Midlands Railway; Leamington/Stratford–Worcester; Snow Hill lines	Stratford-upon-Avon Parkway

=== Platforms ===
The station has 3 platforms. Platform 1 serves southbound Chiltern Railways and West Midlands Railway services to Leamington Spa, London Marylebone and Stratford-upon-Avon. Platform 2 serves northbound trains towards Birmingham, Stourbridge Junction and Kidderminster from the south and platform 3 is used by local West Midlands Railway services that originate/terminate here on the line towards Birmingham, Stourbridge and Worcester.

== 1963 crash ==
On 15 August 1963 three train crew died in the Knowle and Dorridge rail crash. The three fatalities occurred when a signalman's error in Knowle and Dorridge signal box allowed an express train to collide at 20 miles per hour (32 km/h) with a freight train in the station, killing the express train crew.
