= Warwick railway station =

Railway station in Warwickshire, England

Warwick
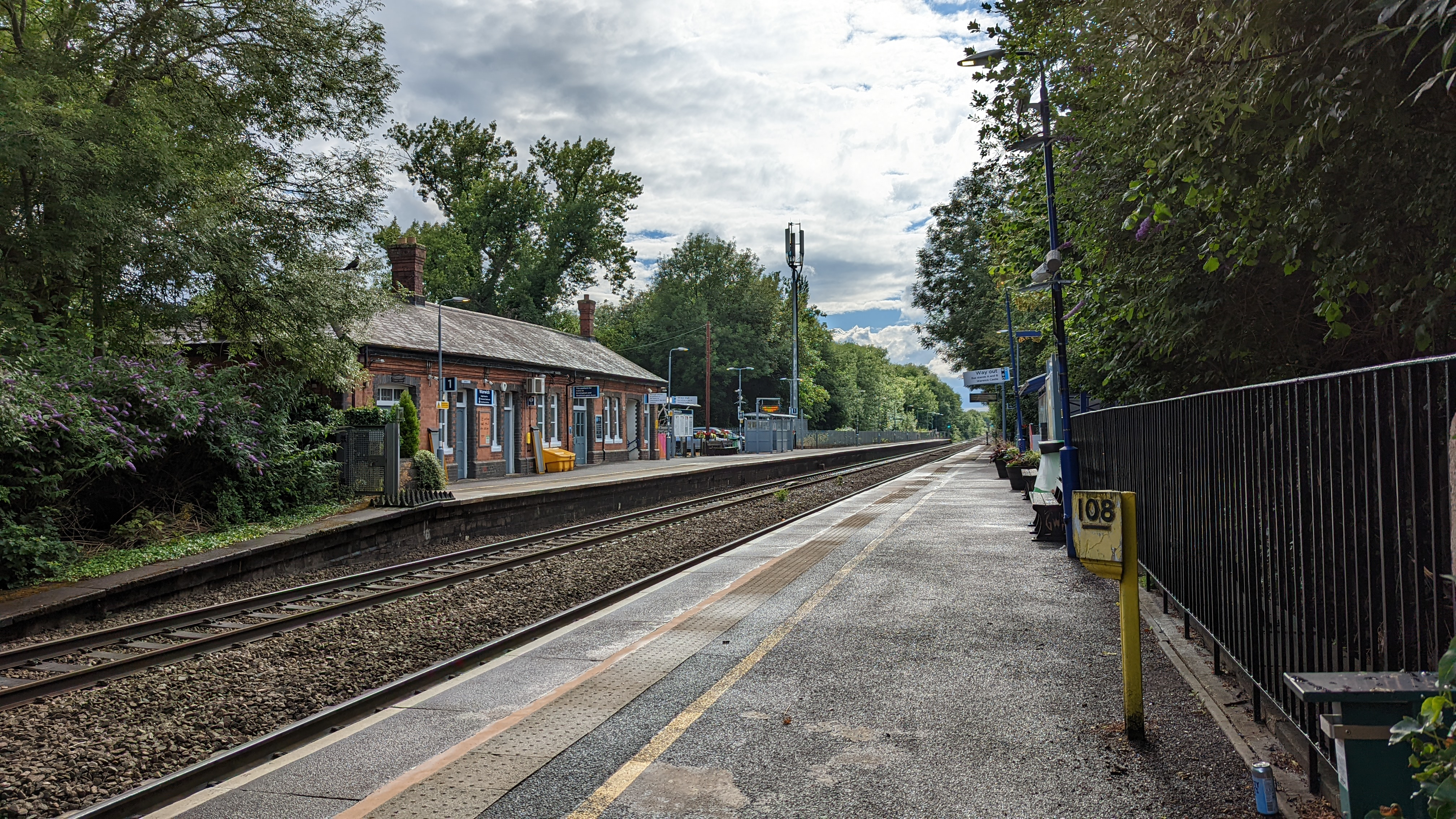
- Warwick station in 2022, looking west towards Birmingham.

General information
- Location: Warwick, District of Warwick; England
- Coordinates: 52.2865°N 1.5819°W
- Grid reference: SP286654
- Manager: Chiltern Railways
- Platforms: 2

Other information
- Station code: WRW
- Classification: DfT category D

History
- Opened: 1852

Passengers
- 2021/22: ▲0.404 million
- 2022/23: ▲0.482 million
- 2023/24: ▲0.516 million
- 2024/25: ▲0.619 million
- 2025/26: ▲0.631 million
Location
Notes
- Passenger statistics from the Office of Rail and Road

Warwick railway station serves the market town of Warwick in Warwickshire, England. The station is served by Chiltern Railways (who manage the station), and also less frequently by West Midlands Trains. It is located around half a mile north of the town centre.

Warwick is also served by Warwick Parkway railway station on the town's outskirts, which opened in 2000.

== History ==
Warwick station was opened on 1 October 1852 by the Great Western Railway on their main line between London, Oxford and Birmingham. The station's platforms were extended in length in 1892.

The station formerly had an additional bay platform on the western side, which in steam days was often used to hold the bank engine used to assist heavy goods trains up Hatton Bank towards Birmingham. It was extended in May 1911, converted to a loop in June 1944 and shut down on 26 November 1967.

The original buildings on the 'up' (London bound) platform were demolished in 1964.

== Platforms and facilities ==
The main station building is on the Birmingham bound Platform 1, a subway links this to the London bound Platform 2, which has only a basic shelter.

The station is equipped with real-time electronic information departure boards, A staffed ticket office is open for part of the day; there is also a self-service ticket machine located outside the station building, which is on the northbound platform. There is an indoor waiting room by Platform 1 and two outside waiting shelters, one on each platform. There was a 'Permit-to-Travel' machine on the northbound platform but was removed in 2016. In 2012 a cafe selling drinks and snacks opened on Platform, but has since closed. Although car parking is available at the station it is limited and there is a charge for it. A local taxi company called Castle Cabs shares the main station building with Chiltern Railways. The station underwent a light refurbishment in 2022 including repainting and the replacement of signage to correspond with Chilterns' new branding.

The station will receive lift instalment works in 2023 to fit with the governments Access For All scheme. Work was delayed however when the foundations of the existing station were found to be built on the original 1850s station so new plans had to be drawn up.

== Services ==
Most trains calling here are Chiltern Railways trains between London Marylebone and Birmingham Moor Street (mostly half hourly) or Leamington Spa & either Stratford-upon-Avon or Birmingham Snow Hill (both two-hourly). At peak times, these are augmented by a few West Midlands Trains services between Leamington Spa and Stourbridge Junction/Kidderminster or Worcester Shrub Hill. Chiltern also run a limited weekday/weekend through service between Marylebone & Stourbridge Junction that stops here. Most services are operated with Class 165 or Class 168 DMUs or Class 68 locomotives hauling Mark 3 carriages. West Midlands Railway use 172s and occasional 196s for peak time services.

== Gallery ==
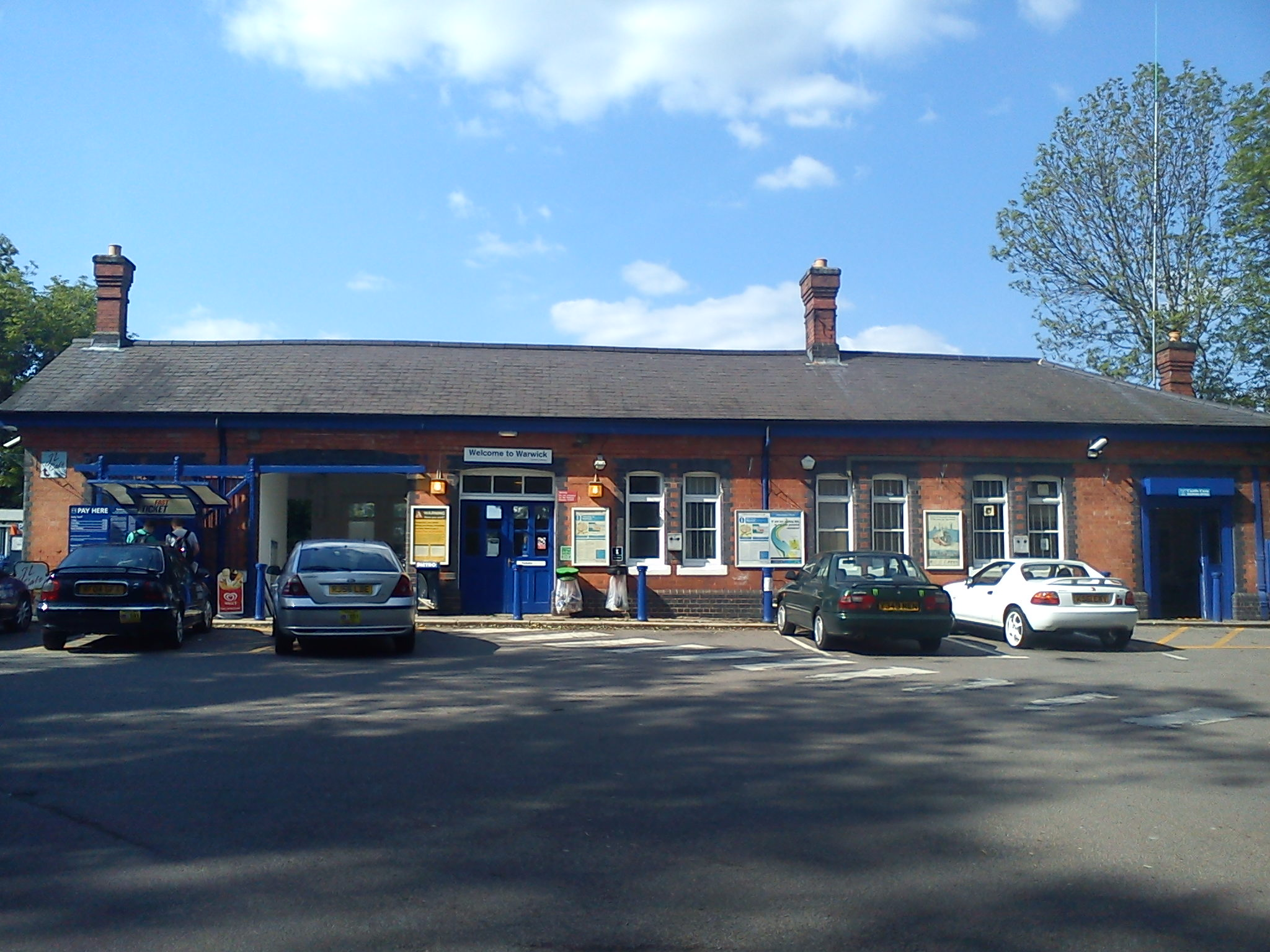
Front of the station, taken from the main station approach

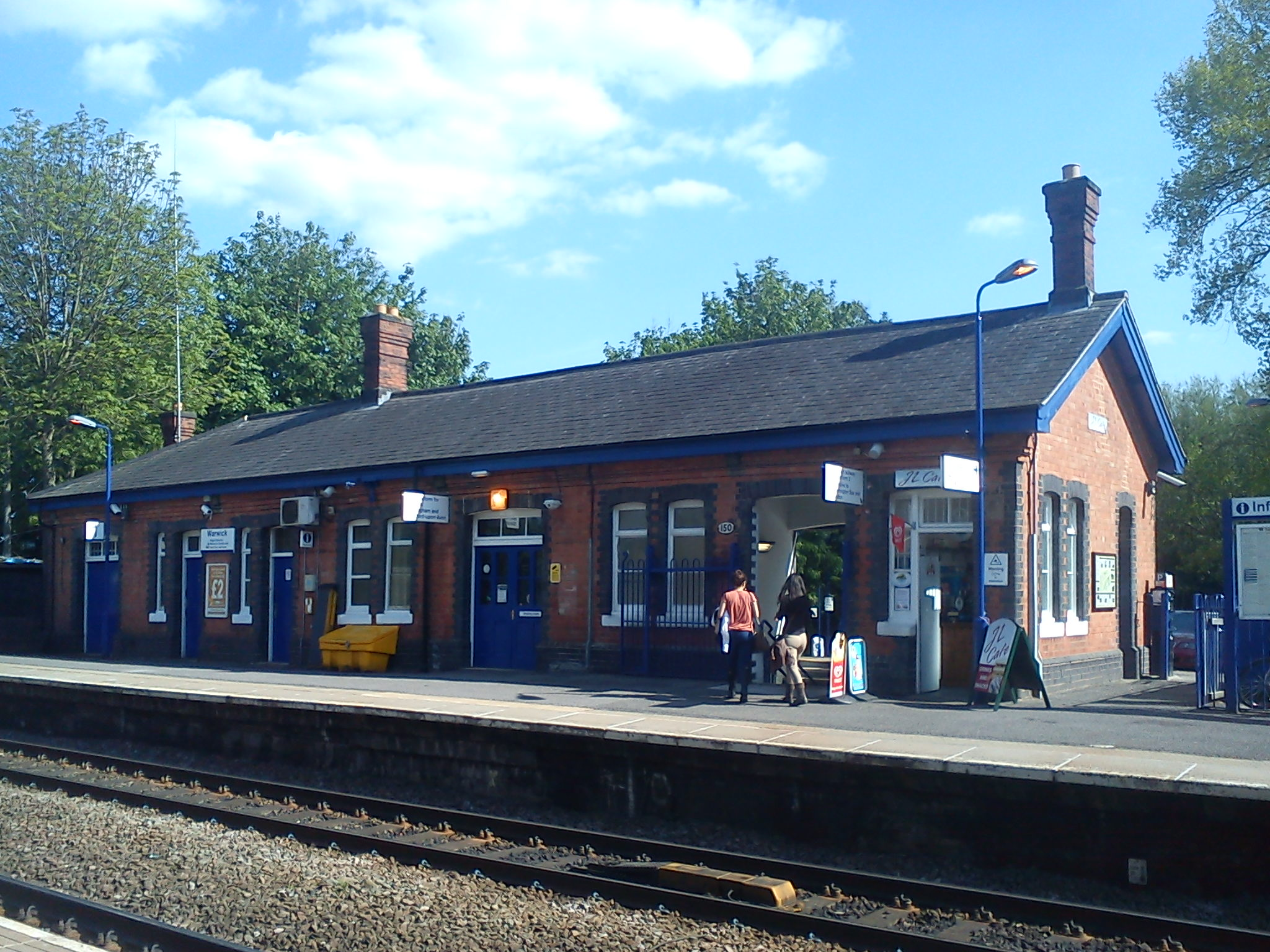
The main station building, taken from Platform 2

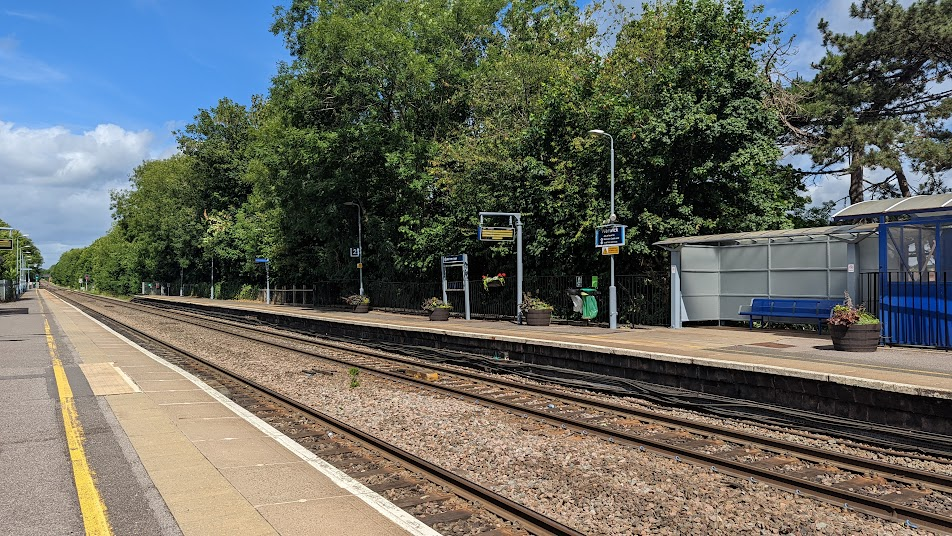
The waiting facilities on Platform 2

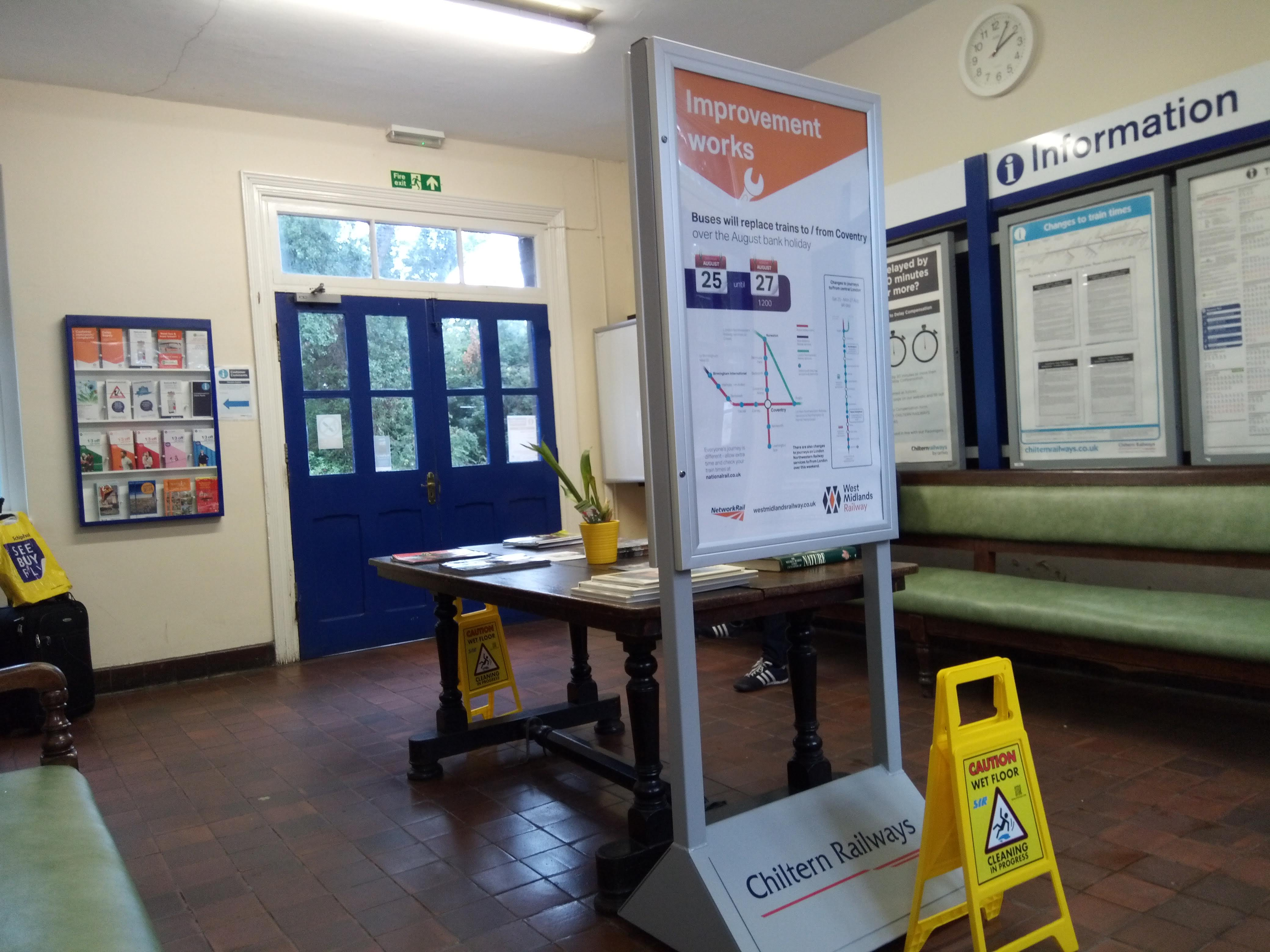
Warwick Station ticket office

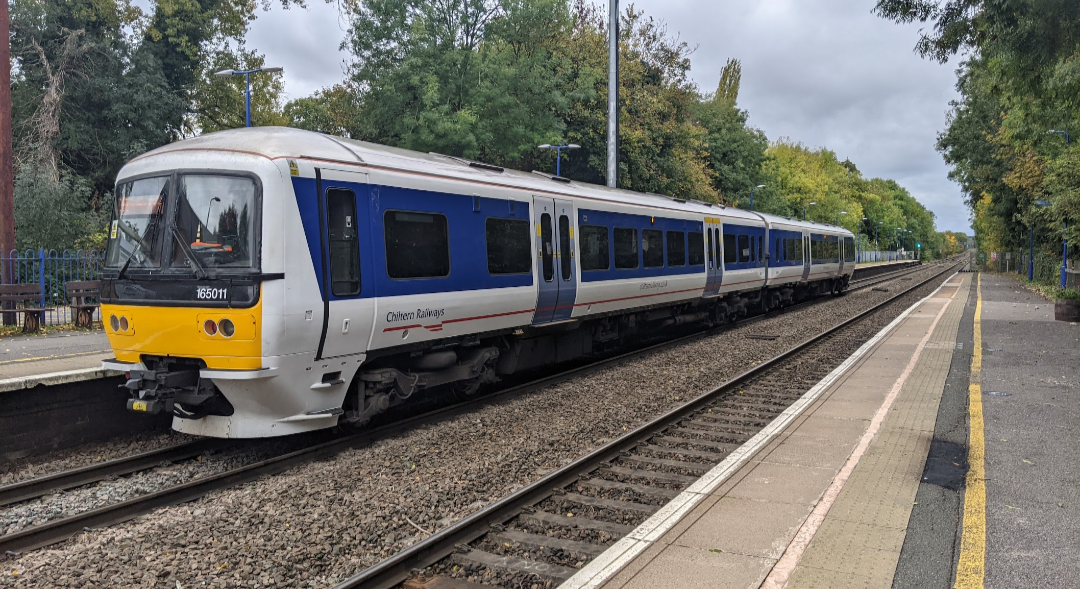
Class 165 on platform 1 bound for Birmingham Moor Street railway station.

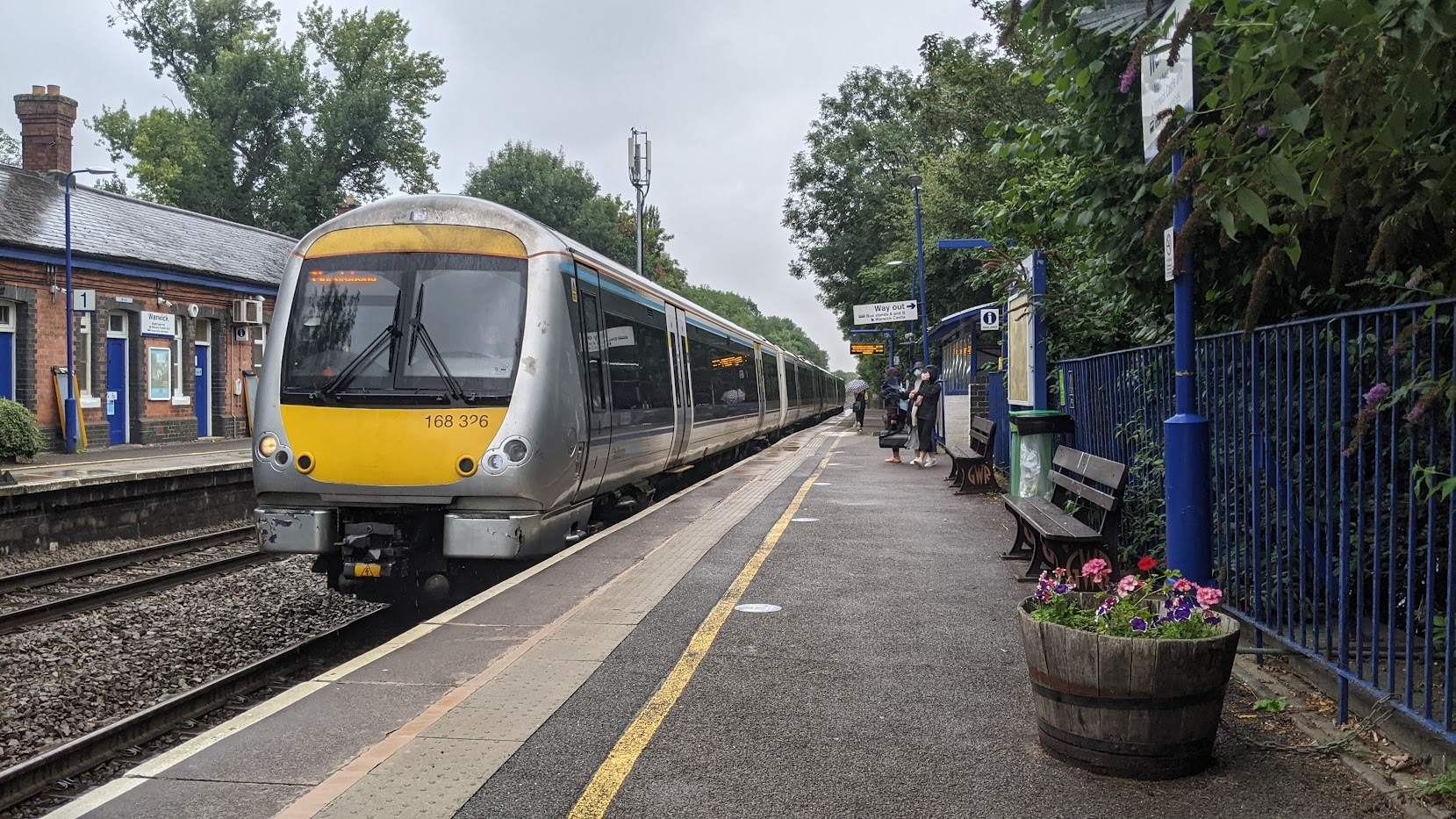
British Rail Class 168 seen on platform 2 departing to Marylebone station.

Preceding station	National Rail	Following station
Warwick Parkway	Chiltern Railways; London to Birmingham	Leamington Spa
Warwick Parkway	Chiltern Railways; Chiltern Main Line fast services	Leamington Spa
Warwick Parkway	Chiltern Railways; Leamington Spa to Stratford-upon-Avon	Leamington Spa
Warwick Parkway; Limited Service	West Midlands Railway; Leamington-Worcester	Leamington Spa; Limited Service
