= Passenger rail terminology =

Terms used for passenger railway lines and equipment

Various terms are used for passenger railway lines and equipment; the usage of these terms differs substantially between areas:

== Rapid transit ==
A rapid transit system is an electric railway characterized by high speed (~80 km/h (50 mph)) and rapid acceleration. It uses passenger railcars operating singly or in multiple unit trains on fixed rails. It operates on separate rights-of-way from which all other vehicular and foot traffic are excluded (i.e. is fully grade-separated from other traffic). The APTA definition also includes the use sophisticated signaling systems, and high platform loading.

Originally, the term rapid transit was used in the 1800s to describe new forms of quick urban public transportation that had a right-of-way separated from street traffic. This set rapid transit apart from horsecars, trams, streetcars, omnibuses, and other forms of public transport. A variant of the term, mass rapid transit (MRT), is also used for metro systems in Southeast Asia and Taiwan.

Though the term was almost always used to describe rail transportation, other forms of transit were sometimes described by their proponents as rapid transit, including local ferries in some cases.

The term bus rapid transit has recently come into use to describe bus lines with features to speed their operation. These usually have more characteristics of light rail than rapid transit.

=== Metro/subway ===
A Metro, originally shortened from 'metropolitan railway', is defined by the International Association of Public Transport (L'Union Internationale des Transports Publics, or UITP) as urban guided transport systems "operated on their own right of way and segregated from general road and pedestrian traffic. They are consequently designed for operations in tunnel, viaducts or on surface level but with physical separation in such a way that inadvertent access is not possible. In different parts of the world, Metro systems are also known in English as the underground, the subway or the tube. Rail systems with specific construction issues operating on a segregated guideway (e.g. monorail, rack railways) are also treated as Metros as long as they are designated as part of the urban public transport network." Metros are used for high capacity public transportation. They can operate in trains of up to 10 or more cars, carrying 1800 passengers or more. Some metro systems run on rubber tires but are based on the same fixed-guideway principles as steel wheel systems.

Paris, Rome, Madrid, Barcelona, Lisbon, Copenhagen, Helsinki, Warsaw, Saint Petersburg, Amsterdam, Rotterdam, Prague and Moscow all have metro (from the word metropolitan where "metro" means "mother" and "politan" means "city") systems which are called metro in French, Italian, Spanish, Portuguese, Danish, Finnish, Polish, Dutch, Czech and Russian.

Subway used in a transit sense refers to a rapid transit heavy rail system that goes underground. The term may refer only to the underground parts of the system, or to the full system. Subway is most commonly used in the United States and the English-speaking parts of Canada, though the term is also used elsewhere, such as to describe the Glasgow Subway in Scotland, and in translation of system names or descriptions in some Asian and Latin American cities.

In some cities where subway is used, it refers to the entire system; in others, only to the portions that actually are underground. Naming practices often select one type of placement in a system where several are used; there are many subways with above-ground components, and on the other hand, the Vancouver SkyTrain and Chicago "L" include underground sections. Historic posters referred to Chicago's Red & Blue lines (then called the State Street & Milwaukee/Dearborn lines) as "the subway lines".

==== Light metro ====
Medium-capacity system (MCS), also known as light rapid transit or light metro, is a rail transport system with a capacity greater than light rail, but less than typical heavy-rail rapid transit.

=== Sub-surface subway ===
Light rail / street car lines that have underground sections that are referred to as subway are often sub-surface subways, alternatively termed semi-metro or semi-rapid transit. Notably, Boston's Green Line and the Newark City Subway, each about half underground, originated from fully surface streetcar lines. Also, the Buffalo Metro Rail is referred to as "the subway", while it uses light rail equipment and operates in a pedestrian mall downtown for half of its route and underground for the remaining section. Sometimes the term is qualified, such as in Philadelphia, where trolleys operate in an actual subway for part of their route and on city streets for the remainder. This is locally styled subway-surface.

When the Boston subway was originally built, the subway label was only used for sections into which streetcars (trams) operated, and the rapid transit sections were called tunnels. Also, in some countries, subway refers to systems built under roads and the informal term tube is used for the deep-underground tunnelled systems (such as London's Piccadilly line) – in this usage, somewhat technical nowadays and not used much in London, underground is regardless the general term for both types of system.

=== Other definitions of subway ===
Bus subways are uncommon but do exist, though in these cases the non-underground portions of route are not called subways. Until March 2019, Seattle had a downtown bus subway in which diesel-electric hybrid buses and light rail trains operated in a shared tunnel. The hybrid buses ran in electrical-only mode while traveling through the tunnel and overhead wires power the light rail trains which continue to operate in the tunnel. Bus subways are sometimes built to provide an exclusive right-of-way for bus rapid transit lines, such as the MBTA Silver Line in Boston.

Subway, outside the US, and especially in Europe, often refers to an underground pedestrian passageway linking large road interconnections that are often too difficult or dangerous to cross at ground level. In Canada, the term subway may be used in either sense.

=== Underground and tube ===
The usage of underground is very similar to that of subway, describing an underground train system.

In London the colloquial term tube now refers to the London Underground, and is the most common word used for the underground system; and it is used by Transport for London, the local government body responsible for most aspects of the transport system throughout Greater London. However, strictly speaking, it should only refer to those deep lines which run in bored circular tunnels as opposed to those constructed near to the surface by 'cut-and-cover' methods. The Glasgow metro system is known as the Glasgow Subway or colloquial as "the subway". The word metro is not usually used in London or Glasgow to refer to those cities' metros, but it is used in and around Newcastle upon Tyne to refer to the Tyne and Wear Metro.

=== Overground ===
In the UK, the term overground was created in 2007 by Transport for London to refer to a mainly above-ground suburban rail network serving Greater London, the London Overground, which took over Silverlink Metro routes. Colloquially, the term is also sometimes used to refer to other National Rail networks within London, or more broadly any non-London Underground rail service.

=== U-Bahn and S-Bahn ===
The term metro is not usually used to describe metro systems in German-speaking areas (Germany, Austria and parts of Switzerland), instead using the term U-Bahn – a shortening of Untergrundbahn, meaning "underground railway" – and S-Bahn – an abbreviation for the German Stadtschnellbahn or just Schnellbahn (fast city train, fast train) the more common English translation, suburban train. So for example in Berlin, the mostly underground system is known as the Berlin U-Bahn and it is integrated with the mostly above-ground system, known as the Berlin S-Bahn. The Frankfurt U-Bahn is an important exception, the system being really a light rail transit system with underground sections.

Hamburg S-Bahn fulfills all criteria for heavy rail inside the state and city of Hamburg, but some lines go beyond the state border into the state of Niedersachsen and there the S-Bahn runs with lower train frequency.

The same applies also to the S-Bahn and U-Bahn in Copenhagen, Denmark, with the only exception that the word "Metro" is used instead of "U-Bahn", and "S-tog" instead of "S-Bahn". (The Danish word "S-tog" applies to the trains (tog), rather than the tracks as in Germany; "S-tog" means "S-train".) Otherwise, the S-Bahn of Berlin and the S-tog of Copenhagen are very similar with the exception of the size.

In Switzerland, where there is only one underground railway system in Lausanne, the term metro is generally used, due to the influence from the French language.

In Sweden, the metro of Stockholm is called "Tunnelbana" or "T-bana" which refers to the fact that the trains often run in tunnels. The same applies to Norway and the "T-bane" of Oslo.

=== Elevated and overhead ===
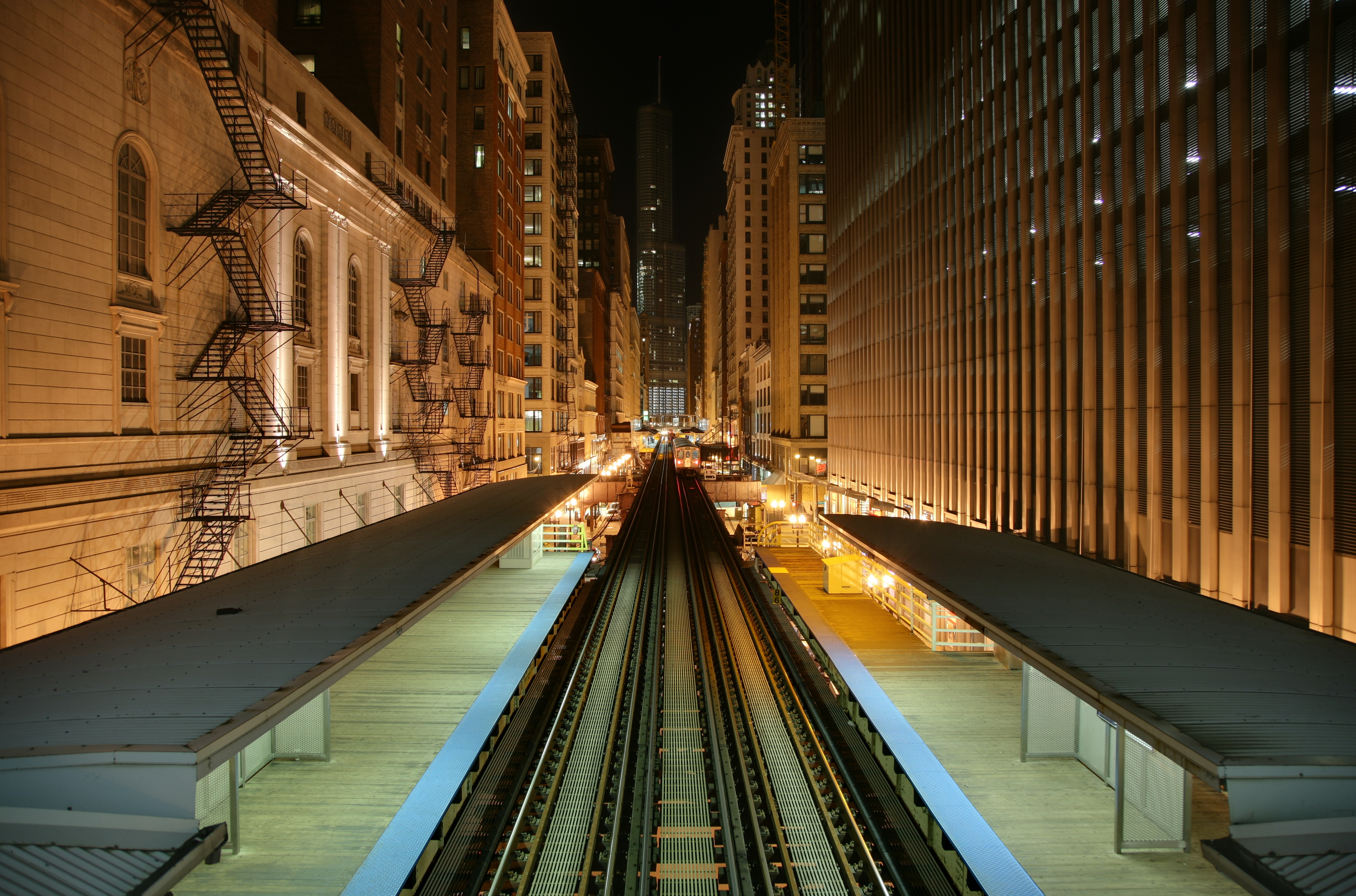
Chicago Transit Authority Chicago "L" tracks in the Chicago Loop at the Adams/Wabash station at night

Elevated is a shorthand for elevated railway, a railway built on supports over other rights of way, generally city streets. The term overhead tends to be used in Europe. The names of elevated railways are sometimes further abbreviate it to El or L. Some examples include:

- Chicago "L" A mostly elevated rapid transit system
- Vancouver SkyTrain An automated rapid transit system that is mostly elevated.
- New York City Subway A combination of the old IRT and BMT rapid transit systems that had built or leased numerous elevated lines throughout the entire city. New York "El's" are the oldest ones in the United States, dating from 1869. Today, the majority of "El" lines in New York are in Brooklyn, Queens, and The Bronx. Most "El's" in Manhattan were torn down in the 1940s and 1950s, some replaced by subways.
- Liverpool Overhead Railway This was the United Kingdom's only true elevated railway, although the London and Greenwich Railway of 1836 was constructed on a 3.45 miles (5.55 km) brick viaduct for the greater part of its length.
- SEPTA's Market–Frankford Line is elevated except for the portion running through Center City and University City, and is sometimes referred to as the "El".
- The Manila LRT Line 1 in Manila, Philippines, is an elevated railway, made operational in 1984 and the country's first urban rail transit since Manila tram service ended in 1944, during the Japanese occupation of the city.
- The BTS Skytrain is an elevated rapid transit system in Bangkok, Thailand, which was officially opened on 5 December 1999 by Princess Maha Chakri Sirindhorn. It now consists of 34 stations and 2 lines.
- Sydney Metro Monorail was an elevated monorail through the CBD of Sydney from the bicentenary in 1988 until its dismantlement in 2013.

== Heavy rail ==
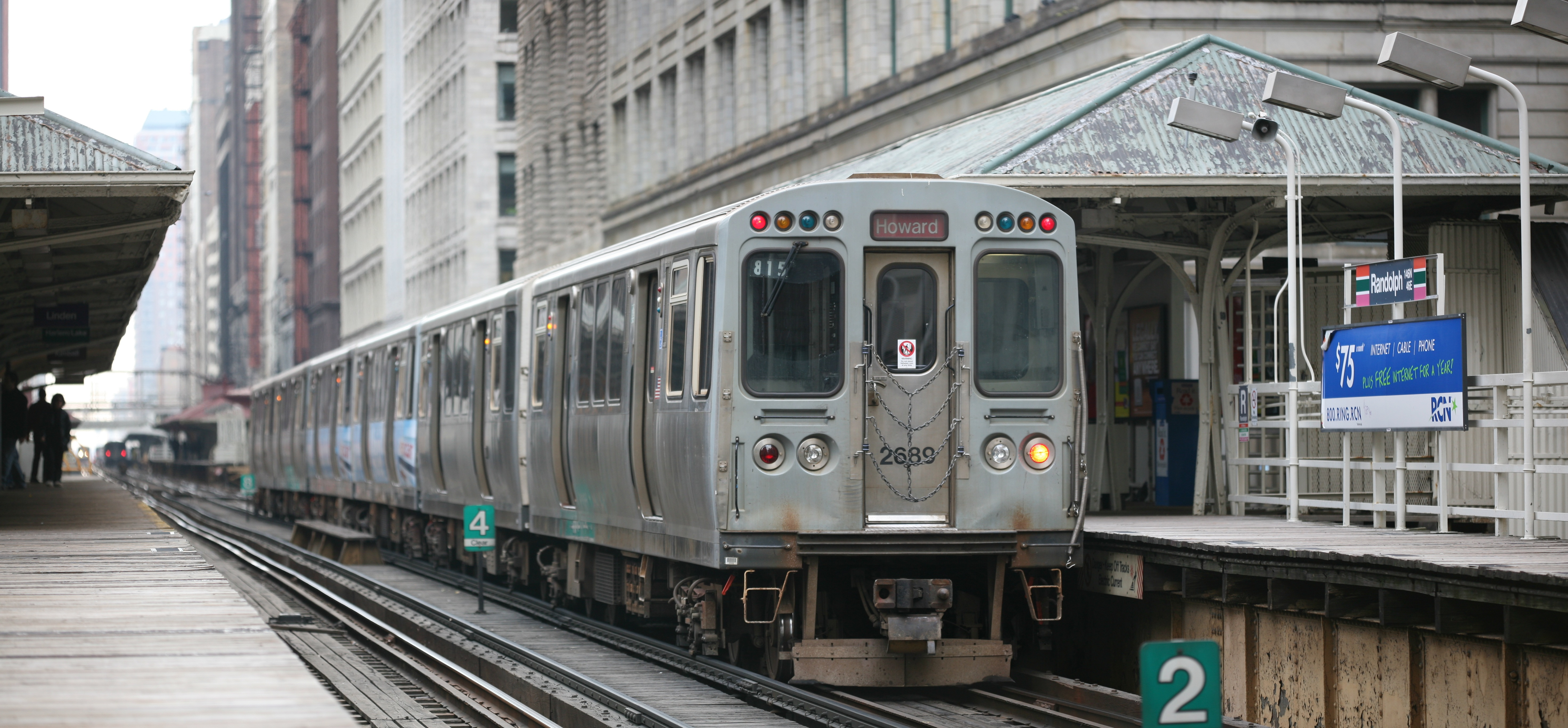
A 2600 series car brings up the rear of a Red Line train (temporarily rerouted through the elevated tracks of the Chicago Loop) at Randolph/Wabash.

The term heavy rail has different meanings in different parts of the world.

=== Europe ===
==== Austria, Germany, Switzerland ====
The German complementary term is Vollbahn and the opposite Kleinbahn. These terms were defined to distinguish different axle loads and connected construction rules. Today the term Vollbahn is not common and Kleinbahn is used for narrow-gauge lines.

==== United Kingdom ====
In the United Kingdom, heavy rail refers to conventional railways forming part of the national network, including commuter, intercity, high-speed rail, regional rail and freight services, as distinct from metro, light rail and tram lines, people movers, and similar. The London Underground, despite being described as a metro system, is nonetheless officially classified as being heavy rail.

=== North America ===
In North America, the American Public Transportation Association defines a heavy-rail system as an electric railway with the capacity to handle a heavy volume of traffic. The term is often used to distinguish it from light rail systems, which usually handle a smaller volume of passengers.

In North America, heavy rail can also refer to rapid transit, when referring to systems with heavier passenger loadings than light rail systems, but distinct from commuter rail and intercity rail systems. It is characterized by high-speed, passenger rail cars running in separate rights-of-way from which all other vehicular and foot traffic are excluded.

Such passenger rail cars are almost always electrically driven, with power either drawn from an overhead line or an electrified third rail.

=== Global ===
Heavy rail term outside North America refers globally to both main line/branch line freight rail and passenger rail (commuter, regional, intercity and high-speed) other than large-capacity metro and nationally/internationally operated but still a subject of debate.

== At-grade urban rail transit ==
=== Tram, streetcar, trolley ===
The terms tram, streetcar, and trolley refer to most forms of common carrier rail transit that run entirely or partly on streets, providing a local service and picking up and discharging passengers at any street corner, unless otherwise marked. While tram or tramway are widely used worldwide, the term used varies in different dialects of English, with streetcar and trolley most commonly used in North America (streetcar being more common in the western and central part of the continent and trolley in the eastern part), while tram predominates in Europe and elsewhere.

Tram is a British word, cognate with the Low German traam, and the Dutch trame, meaning the "shafts of a wheelbarrow". From this the term "tram" was used in the coal mines of Scotland and Northern England for a coal cart running on rails, and by extension to any similar system of trackway.

Streetcar is an American word derived from "street" + "car", where "car" is used in the sense of a vehicle running on rails, i.e. railway car. The first American streetcars, introduced around 1830, were horsecars, and this type of streetcar became ubiquitous because very few of the streets in American cities were paved. Mechanical versions, pulled by cables, were introduced around 1870. Electric streetcars were introduced in the 1880s and soon replaced the horse-drawn streetcar in cities across the United States.

Trolley is an American word derived from the electric current pickup mechanism in early systems. The first successful electric streetcars in the United States used a system devised by Frank J. Sprague, in which a spring-loaded trolley pole pushed a small trolley wheel up against an overhead wire to collect electricity for the motors. Although not the first overhead collection system, it was far more reliable than its predecessors, and eventually became used by almost all streetcars. Some authorities believe that the vehicle became known as a trolley car because it reminded people (particularly on the West Coast) of a boat trolling for fish. Others believe it derived from a dialect word for a wheeled cart.

In the U.S. the word tram frequently refers to a special-purpose bus used as a shuttle (and often not designed for use on public roads), such as for parking lot shuttles at theme parks and major events or transportation within theme parks. Other common North American English meanings of the term tram include aerial cable cars and short-distance, rubber-tired people-movers (such as at certain airports). Tourist buses that have been given the appearance of a vintage streetcar (i.e. trolley-replica buses) are most commonly referred to, ambiguously, simply as trolleys by the companies or entities operating them or selling them, but may be referred to as trams or streetcars.

=== Historical systems ===
Specific terms for some historically important tram technologies include horsecar, heritage streetcar, and cable car.

Heritage streetcar (also known as heritage trolley or vintage trolley) is an American term for streetcar systems that use vehicles that were built before 1960, or modern replicas of such vehicles.

Cable car is an American word for a passenger rail vehicle attached to a moving cable located below the street surface and powered by engines or motors at a central location, not on board the vehicle. There are cable cars operating in numerous cities, such as San Francisco.

=== Light railway ===
A light railway is a British English term referring to a railway built at lower costs and to lower standards than typical "heavy rail". These lighter standards allow lower costs of operation at the price of slower operating speeds and lower vehicle capacity. They were permitted under the Light Railways Act 1896 and intended to bring railways to rural areas. The London Docklands Light Railway, has more rapid transit style features than would be typical of light rail systems, but fits within the U.K. light railway definition.

=== Light rail ===
A light rail transit (LRT) system is an urban rail transit system with a "light" passenger capacity compared to heavy rail and metro systems. Its operating characteristics are that it uses railcars, called light rail vehicles (LRVs), operating singly or in short multiple unit trains on fixed rails in a right-of-way that is not necessarily grade-separated from other traffic for much of the way. Light rail vehicles are almost always electrically driven, with power usually being drawn from an overhead line rather than an electrified third rail, though a few exceptional systems use diesel multiple units (DMUs) instead as a cheaper alternative to an electrically driven light rail system.

The phrase light rail was coined in the 1970s during the re-emergence of streetcars/trams with more modern technology. It was devised in 1972 by the U.S. Urban Mass Transportation Administration (UMTA; the precursor to the Federal Transit Administration) to describe new streetcar transformations which were taking place, and was a translation of the German word Stadtbahn. However, instead of the literal translation of city rail, UMTA used light rail instead. In general, it refers to streetcar/tram systems with rapid transit-style features. It is named to distinguish it from heavy rail, which refers to rapid transit systems as well as heavier regional rail/intercity rail.

A few systems such as people movers and personal rapid transit could be considered as even "lighter", at least in terms of how many passengers are moved per vehicle and the speed at which they travel. Monorails are a separate technology.

Light rail systems can typically handle steeper inclines than heavy rail, and curves sharp enough to fit within street intersections. They are typically built in urban areas, providing frequent service with multiple-unit trains or single cars.

The most difficult distinction to draw is that between light rail and streetcar/tram systems. There is a significant amount of overlap between the technologies, and it is common to classify streetcars/trams as a subtype of light rail rather than as a distinct type of transportation. The two general versions are:

1. The traditional type, where the tracks and trains run along the streets and share space with road traffic. Stops tend to be frequent, and little effort is made to set up special stations. Because space is shared, the tracks are usually visually unobtrusive.
2. A more modern variation, where the trains tend to run along their own right-of-way and are often separated from road traffic. Stops are generally less frequent, and the passengers are often boarded from a platform. Tracks are highly visible, and in some cases significant effort is expended to keep traffic away through the use of special signaling, and even level crossings (or grade crossings) with gate arms.

At the highest degree of separation, it can be difficult or impossible to draw the line between light rail and rapid transit, as in the case of London's Docklands Light Railway, which would likely not be called light rail were it not for the contrast between it and the London Underground.

Many light rail systems – even fairly old ones – have a combination of the two, with both on-road and off-road sections. In some countries, only the latter is described as light rail. In those places, trams running on mixed right of way are not regarded as light rail, but considered distinctly as streetcars or trams. However, the requirement for saying that a rail line is "separated" can be quite minimal – sometimes just with concrete "buttons" to discourage automobile drivers from getting onto the tracks.

There is a significant difference in cost between these different classes of light rail transit. The traditional style is often less expensive by a factor of two or more. Despite the increased cost, the more modern variation (which can be considered as "heavier" than old streetcar systems, even though it's called light rail) is the dominant form of new urban rail transit in the United States. The Federal Transit Administration helps to fund many projects, but as of 2004, the rules to determine which projects will be funded are unfavorable toward the simpler streetcar systems (partly because the vehicles tend to be somewhat slower). Some places in the country have set about building the less expensive streetcar lines themselves or with only minimal federal support. Most of these lines have been "heritage" railways, using refurbished or replica streetcars harkening back to the first half of the 20th century. However, a few, such as the Portland Streetcar, use modern vehicles. There is a growing desire to push the Federal Transit Administration to help fund these startup lines as well.

Light rail is generally powered by electricity, usually by means of overhead wires, but sometimes by a live rail, also called third rail (a high voltage bar alongside the track), requiring safety measures and warnings to the public not to touch it. In some cases, particularly when initial funds are limited, diesel-powered versions have been used, but it is not a preferred option. Some systems, such as AirTrain JFK in New York City, are automatic, dispensing with the need for a driver; however, such systems are not what is generally thought of as light rail, crossing over into rapid transit. Automatic operation is more common in smaller people mover systems than in light rail systems, where the possibility of grade crossings and street running make driverless operation of the latter inappropriate.

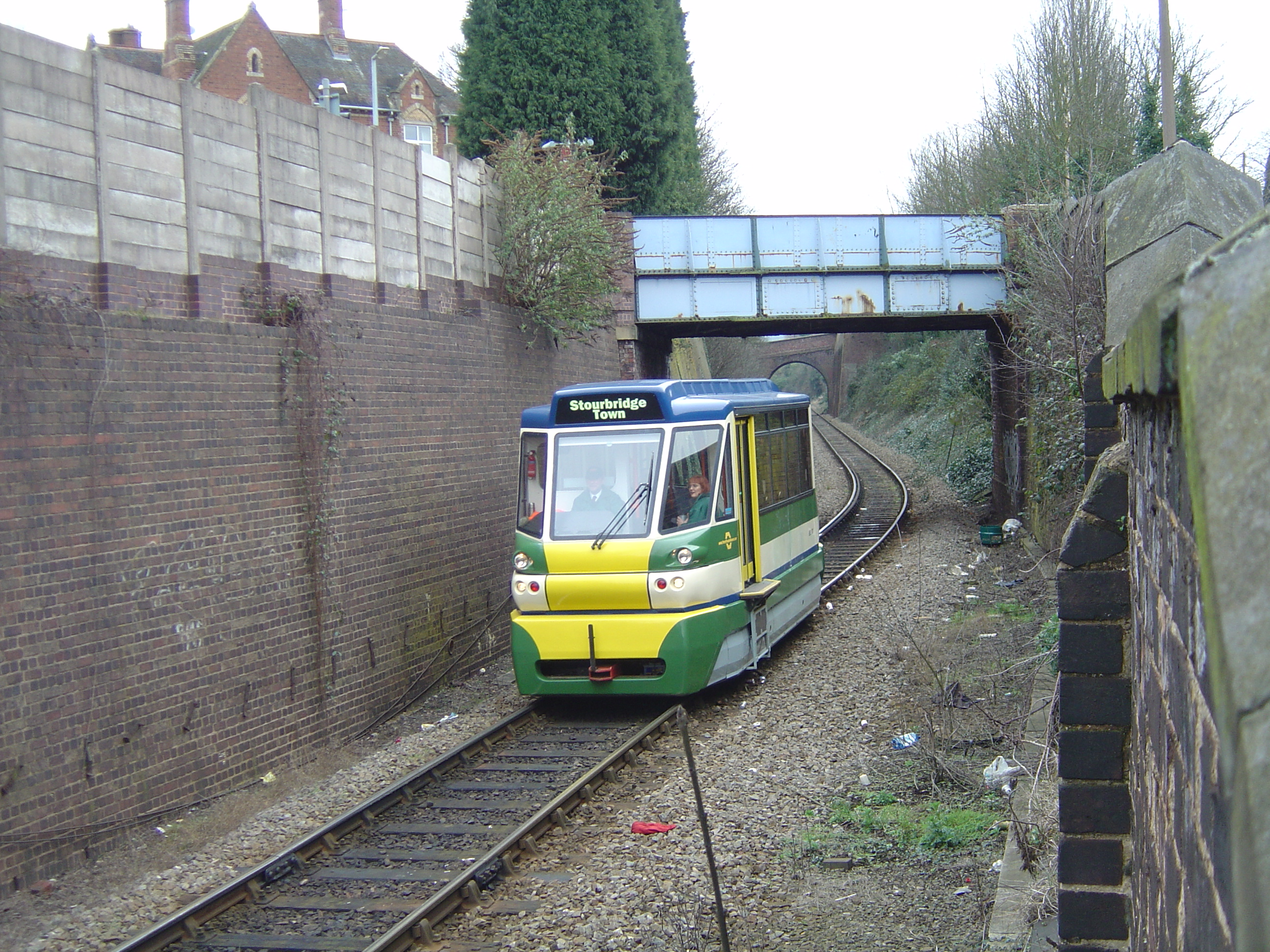
Parry People Mover ultra light rail on Stourbridge Town branch line

Very light rail or referred to as ultra light rail is a term for light rail with more modest initial requirements than typical light rail. Parry People Mover which is grade-separated, low passenger capacity (maximum 35 standing) powered by LPG with no overhead lines, has been described as ultra light rail. The proposed Coventry Very Light Rail is at-grade, low passenger capacity (60-70 people), battery powered with no overhead wires also falls into this category. A Very Light rail vehicles is described as vehicles weighing less than 1 tonne / m3.

=== Interurban ===
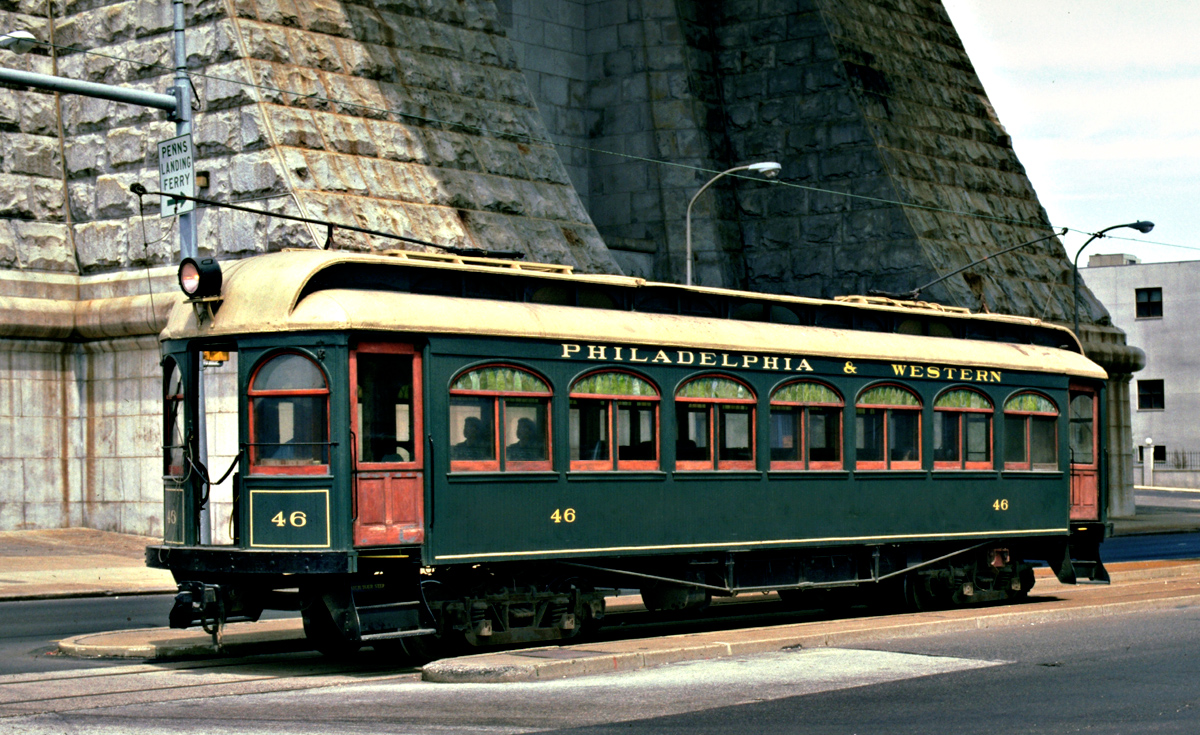
An interurban tram from the Philadelphia & Western Railroad, which survived long in the interurban business

In the U.S., interurban (German Überland(straßen)bahn) refers to a higher-speed streetcar (tram) line – i.e. electrical rail cars or trains which run both between the cities or towns (often in rural environments) on their own right-of-way, and through the city streets as trams. In the U.S., some interurban rail cars constructed in the period 1900–1930 ran at extremely high speed for its time. Essentially, the classic interurbans were the light-rail lines of the day. Several advanced innovations – like streamlining, wind tunnel research and lightweight constructions – have their origin on the interurban scene, or were early adopted by companies like J. G. Brill Company, Cincinnati Car Company, and St. Louis Car Company. The fastest interurbans had a maximum service speed at 145–150 km/h (90–93 mph), and an average speed including stops at above 80 km/h (50 mph). The Cincinnati–Toledo route of Cincinnati and Lake Erie Railroad was 349 km (217 mi). A few interurbans like Philadelphia and Western Railroad adapted to high speeds with double-track, absolute block signalling and without grade crossings. Others ran at (too) high speed on single-track right-of-way without block signalling – and experienced disastrous wrecks.

The classic U.S. interurbans are all but gone, with two of the remaining (Norristown High Speed Line, IRT Dyre Avenue Line) having been upgraded to rapid transit specifications, and a third system (Cleveland's Blue and Green Lines) now considered to be light rail. The South Shore Line, which runs from Chicago's Millennium Station to South Bend, Indiana, has been converted to modern electric rapid-transit operation on the dense corridor between Chicago and Gary, Indiana, but still runs essentially as an interurban through several small towns between Gary and South Bend. Los Angeles has a light-rail system whose lines sometimes follow the routes of the area's interurbans, although this revival commenced decades after the original interurban ceased service.

The European interurbans, like the Silesian Interurbans (Tramwaje Śląskie S.A.; German Schlesische Straßenbahn) and Belgium's Coastal Tram, were (and are) more like conventional tramways, as their names indicate.

Interurbans sometimes used freight railways rather than building their own track.

In Australia, interurban refers to long-distance commuter trains such as the routes between Newcastle and Sydney, between Brisbane and Gympie, or between Brisbane and the Gold Coast. Some interurban trains may operate from where suburban lines end, such as Southern Higlands services between Campbelltown and Goulburn, or between Ipswich and Rosewood. These do not have the features of "intercity trains" in other parts of the world, such as booked seats and meal services, but are bare commuter trains. They are properly called interurban rather than intercity, although New South Wales refers to its interurban services as "intercity" trains and Victoria refers to theirs as "regional" trains.

=== Tram-train ===
Tram-trains are railcars or trains which run like trams (streetcars) in city streets, and on heavy rail tracks out to the suburbs or between the cities. Usually, this requires two current systems (German Zweisystemstadtbahn, Stadtbahn with two systems), both the tram voltage (600 or 750 V DC) and the heavy rail high voltage (in Germany, 15 kV AC). The vehicles must also be adapted to the heavy rail's signalling system. This transit mode combines the tram's availability with stops in the street, and the heavy rail's higher speed. They are often faster than most rapid transit (metro) systems. The first system was opened in Karlsruhe in 1992. Their top speed is often 100 km/h (62 mph), in Kassel as much as 114 km/h (71 mph). This transit mode is a rebirth of the interurban.

== Inter-city, regional and commuter rail ==
Passenger services are frequently split into three categories; Inter-city, Regional, and Commuter.

Inter-city rail covers fast trains linking urban areas over long distances. Examples include the former BR's InterCity and Germany's DB Fernverkehr.

Regional rail covers the slower services that stop at more stations than inter-city services along the same routes, as well as services on the more minor lines that do not see inter-city services. They provide services to and from smaller settlements and link them to long-distance inter-city services. Examples include the former BR's Regional Railways, France's TER (Transport express régional) and Germany's DB Regio services.

Commuter rail covers the services within singular urban areas that link the districts and suburbs within it. Examples include New York's Metro-North Railroad and London's Overground.

Note that in North America, "regional rail" is often used as a synonym for "commuter rail", often using "commuter rail" to refer to systems that primarily or only offer service during the rush hour while using "regional rail" to refer to systems that offer all-day service. In Europe, trains are assigned to different categories based on several factors, and categories vary between countries.

== Other types of rail transit ==
Automated guideway transit refers to guided transit vehicles operating singly or in multi-car trains with fully automated control (no crew on transit units). Service may be on a fixed schedule or in response to a passenger-activated call button. Automated guideway transit includes personal rapid transit, group rapid transit, and people mover systems.

Personal rapid transit (PRT), also called personal automated transport (PAT), is a public transportation concept that offers on-demand, non-stop transportation, using small, independent vehicles on a network of specially built guideways.

People mover or automated people mover (APM) systems are fully automated, grade-separated mass transit systems which serve a relatively small area such as an airport, downtown district or theme park. The term "people mover" has become generic for the type of system, which may use technologies such as monorail, duorail, automated guideway transit or maglev.

Monorail means a system of guided transit vehicles operating on or suspended from a single rail, beam, or tube. Usually they operate in trains. Monorails are distinguished from other types of elevated rail system by their use of only a single beam, and from light rail and tram systems by the fact they are always grade-separated from other vehicles and pedestrians.

Suspension railway is a form of elevated monorail where the vehicle is suspended from a fixed track (as opposed to a cable used in aerial tramways), which is built above street level, over a river or canal, or an existing railway track.

== Service type ==
=== Local service ===
Means trains stop at every station on a route. For light rail vehicles operating on city streets as trams or streetcars, local service is analogous to local bus service, where stops are every block or two apart.

=== Express service ===
Means trains operate for long distances without stopping, skipping some stations between stops. This speeds up longer trips, especially in major urban areas. In major cities, express trains may have separate tracks for at least part of their routes.

== Passenger boarding ==
=== Street-level boarding ===
Used primarily by light rail and tram lines that stop on the street rather than at stations. No platforms are used, the passengers walk up steps into the vehicles. For wheelchairs, a retractable lift or ramp is required to gain access to the vehicle.

=== Low-level platforms ===
Generally about 30 to 45 centimetres (12 to 18 in) above track level and are used primarily by some commuter rail and light rail and tram/streetcar rail systems. Wheelchairs can board low-floor vehicles directly from the platform, but high-floor vehicles require retractable lifts or ramps.

=== High-level platforms ===
Generally 45 to 95 centimetres (18 to 37 in) above track level and are used primarily by heavy rail, automated guideway, and some commuter rail lines. Only high-floor vehicles can be used, but wheelchairs can board directly from platforms if vehicle floors are level with the platform.

== Rail terminology with regard to speed ==
=== Conventional rail ===
Generally, the speed range for conventional rail is 160 km/h (99 mph) or less.

The vast majority of local, regional, and express passenger trains, and almost 100% of freight trains are of this category.

Countries that do not make distinction between conventional rail and higher-speed rail can have the maximum speeds of conventional rail up to 200 km/h (124 mph) with the systems that can operate at the speeds higher than that be classified as high-speed rail. For the countries with higher-speed rail classification, the maximum speeds of conventional rail can vary which may go up to 160 km/h (99 mph) such as in Canada.

=== Higher-speed rail ===
Generally, the speed range for higher-speed rail is between 130 km/h (81 mph) and 250 km/h (155 mph) .

The higher-speed rail can operate at top speeds that are higher than conventional rail but the speeds are not as high as those in the high-speed rail services. These services are provided after improvements to the conventional rail infrastructure in order to support trains that can operate safely at higher speeds. There is no globally accepted standard in the speed ranges for this classification. Local and regional jurisdictions may have their own definitions. For example, a definition in North Texas has a wide range of speeds between 80 mph (130 km/h) and 150 mph (240 km/h). A planned construction in Thailand, called medium-speed rail, has the top speeds of 250 km/h (155 mph).

In some cases the term higher speed rail would sound incorrect to define a train travelling below a high speed since higher is greater than high. Therefore, the word higher speed rail would sound correct to refer to a train at a speed between 300 and 500 km/h (i.e. greater than the high speed of 200–300 km/h).

=== High-speed rail ===
Generally, the speed range for high-speed rail is between 200 km/h (124 mph) and 400 km/h (249 mph).

There is no globally accepted standard separating high-speed rail from conventional railroads; however a number of widely accepted variables have been acknowledged by the industry in recent years. Generally, high-speed rail is defined as having a top speed in regular use of over 200 km/h (124 mph). Although almost every form of high-speed rail is electrically driven via overhead lines, this is not necessarily a defining aspect and other forms of propulsion, such as diesel locomotives, may be used. A definitive aspect is the use of continuous welded rail which reduces track vibrations and discrepancies between rail segments enough to allow trains to pass at speeds in excess of 200 km/h (124 mph). Track radius will often be the ultimate limiting factor in a train's speed, with passenger discomfort often more imminent than the danger of derailment. Depending on design speed, banking, and the forces deemed acceptable to the passengers, curves often exceed a 5 kilometer radius. Tilting trains have been developed for achieving greater comfort for passengers, so higher speeds are possible on curvy tracks. Although a few exceptions exist, zero grade crossings is a policy adopted almost worldwide, with advanced switches utilizing very low entry and frog angles. Magnetic levitation trains fall under the category of high-speed rail due to their association with track oriented vehicles; however their inability to operate on conventional railroads often leads to their classification in a separate category.

In the United States, the federal law has used the term "high-speed rail" as the rail services with "reasonably expected to reach sustained speeds of more than 125 miles per hour [200 km/h]" since 1998. In 2009, the United States Department of Transportation created a vision plan for national high-speed rail network with conflicting definitions by describing the lowest speed range of the high-speed rail systems as "Emerging HSR" with top speeds between 90 mph (140 km/h) and 110 mph (180 km/h) This created confusion in terminology and the media started to differentiate the "higher-speed rail" from the high-speed rail. Some state-level departments of transportation and council of governments now use different sets of definitions. For examples, North Central Texas Council of Governments uses the definition of the speeds over 150 mph (241 km/h), and Texas Department of Transportation and Oklahoma Department of Transportation use the speeds of 165 mph (266 km/h) or more to define high-speed rail. These agencies have a separate category for higher-speed rail which can be a wide range of speeds between 80 mph (129 km/h) and 150 mph (241 km/h).

=== Very high-speed rail ===
Generally, the speed range for very high-speed rail is between 310 km/h (193 mph) and 500 km/h (311 mph).

The term is used for the fastest trains introduced after 2000, exceeding 300 km/h (186 mph). Shanghai Transrapid is one example, with a line speed of 430 km/h (267 mph).

=== Ultra high-speed rail ===
Generally, the speed range for ultra high-speed rail is between 500 km/h (311 mph) and 1,000 km/h (621 mph).

A number of both technological and practical variables begin to influence trains in the vicinity of 500–600 km/h (311–373 mph). Technologically, the limitations are by no means beyond reach, however conventional trains begin to encounter several physical obstacles, most notably track damage and pantograph limitations. The current world record for rail vehicles is held by the TGV V150 set on 15 April 2007 at 574.8 km/h (357.2 mph), and conventional trains may indeed eventually reach into ultra high-speeds. However, this test has shown that speeds over 500 km/h are unrealistic for regular usage; it wears down the material too much. Based on current and foreseeable technology, these speeds will more than likely be reached predominantly by maglev trains. The two most prominent maglev trains are the Transrapid with a maximum speed of 550 km/h (342 mph) and the Japanese MLX01, which holds the world land speed record for rail vehicles at 581 km/h (361 mph).

Trains faster than 600 km/h (373 mph) will exceed the speed of most propeller-driven aircraft. Regardless of technological parameters, the track for such a train and anything faster would more than likely require turn radii of significantly higher proportions than current dimensions, essentially preventing anything but a direct line between terminals. Such trains are extremely unlikely in the current or near future.

=== Greater than 1000 km/h (621 mph) ===
Depending on the aerodynamic design of the vehicle and various ambient atmospheric conditions, a train would begin to exhibit transonic airflow in the vicinity of Mach 0.8 (988 km/h) and higher. From a modern perspective, this is essentially the realistic maximum speed of trains as they are known today. This is because the Prandtl-Glauert singularity would cause catastrophic damage to the vehicle as the sound waves reflected off of the ground, potentially blasting the train into the air. The only trains that could exceed this speed significantly are vactrains.

== Rail terminology with respect to railway track gauge ==
Approximately 60% of the world's existing railway lines are built to the standard track gauge where the distance between the inside edges of the rails of the track is 1,435 mm (4 ft 8 1/2 in) (see the list of countries that use the standard gauge).

Narrow-gauge railways have track gauges of between 600 mm (1 ft 11 5/8 in) and 1,435 mm (4 ft 8 1/2 in). They are cheaper to build and operate, but tend to be slower and have less capacity. Minimum-gauge railway have a gauge of less than 600 mm (1 ft 11 5/8 in) and are primarily used as industrial railways rather than for passenger transit. However many miniature railways use this type of gauge.

Broad-gauge railways use a track gauge greater than 1,435 mm (4 ft 8 1/2 in). Examples include 1,520 mm (4 ft 11 27/32 in) Russian gauge, 5 ft 2 1/2 in (1,588 mm) and 1,676 mm (5 ft 6 in).

== Comparison of types ==
Comparison of characteristics and operating standards of types of metropolitan rail systems
Characteristics	Ultra light rail/ Very light rail	Tram or streetcar	Light rail	Metro or heavy rail	Commuter or suburban rail
Rail tracks		At grade – in mixed traffic	Private right-of-way or street running in reserved lanes, sometimes grade-separated	Fully grade-separated	Mostly grade-separated
Power supply	Battery	Overhead lines Cables; Ground-level power supply	Overhead lines (or, rarely, DMU)	Third rail Fourth rail Overhead lines	Overhead lines Third rail Locomotive
Units per train	1	1–2	2–6	Up to 10	Up to 12
Average speed (km/h)		10–20	30–40	30–40	45–65
Passengers per train	35–70	125–250	260–900	800–2,000	1,000–2,200
Maximum passengers per hour per direction		7,500	18,000	40,000	48,000

== See also ==
- Glossary of rail transport terms
- Glossary of Australian railway terms
- Glossary of New Zealand railway terms
- Glossary of North American railway terms
- Glossary of United Kingdom railway terms
