= Stourbridge Basin =

English canal basin

Coordinates: 52.46105°N 2.14861°W

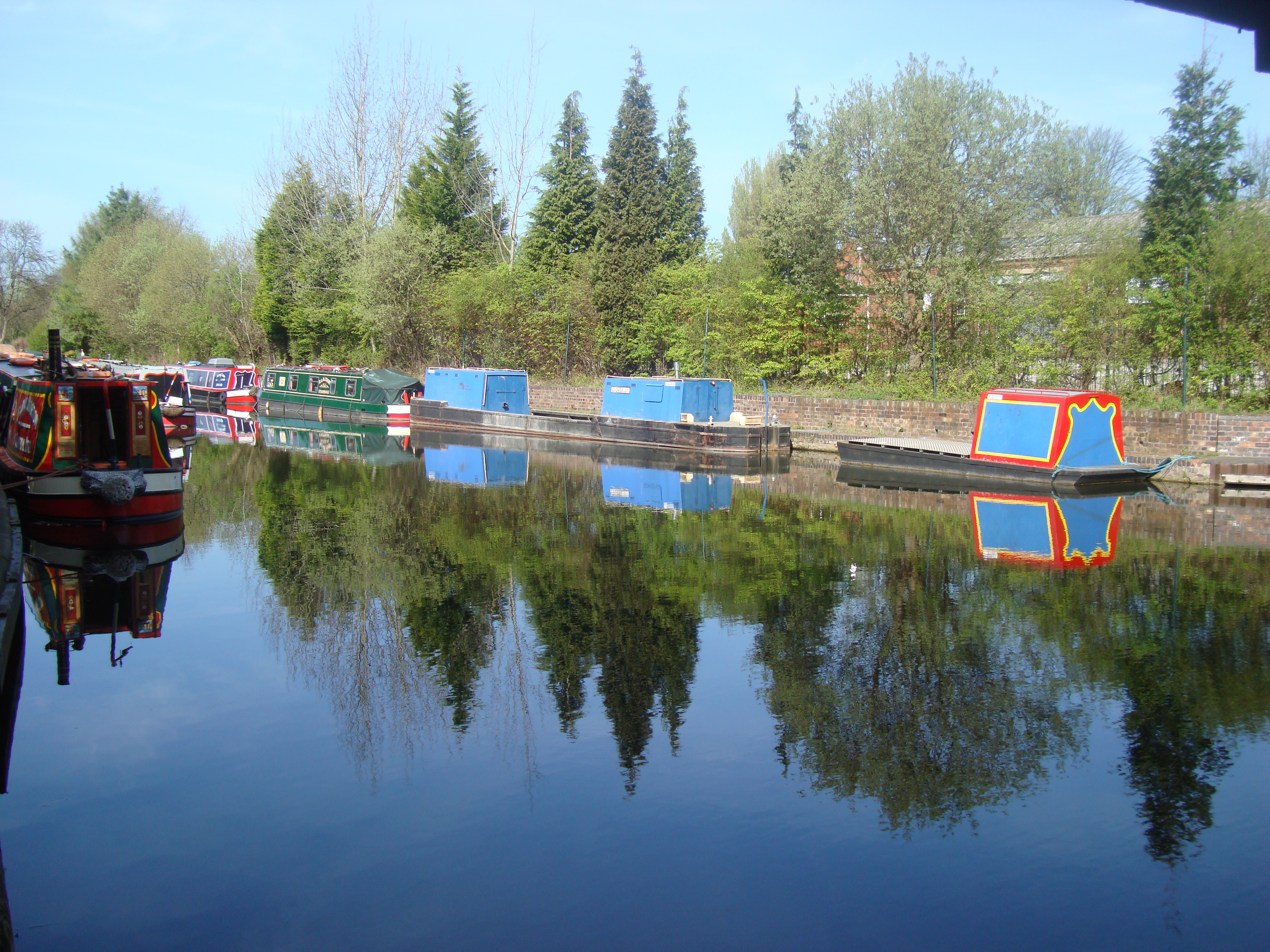

General information
- Location: Stourbridge, Dudley; England
- Grid reference: SO900848

Other information
- Status: Disused

History
- Pre-grouping: Great Western Railway
- Post-grouping: Great Western Railway; British Rail

Key dates
- 1879: Opened
- 1967: Axed
Location

Stourbridge Basin was a canal basin at Amblecote, Stourbridge, West Midlands, England. It lay at the end of the 'Stourbridge Town Arm', a short canal branch which connected to the Stourbridge Canal at Wordsley Junction. The basin was also the site of the Amblecote Goods Depot at the terminus of the Stourbridge Branch Line.

== Construction and expansion ==
The canal branch to Stourbridge Town was built in the 18th century and ended in a basin west of Amblecote High Street (the A491 road) which mainly served the ironworks of John Bradley. In the 1830s a short extension to the canal was built under the roadway to serve the ironworks of Foster and Orme east of High Street.

Construction of the Stourbridge Branch Line by the Great Western Railway was authorised by the Great Western Railway Act 1874 (37 & 38 Vict. c. lxxiv) on 30 June 1874. The branch opened for passenger traffic to Stourbridge Town railway station in 1879. The last 700 yards (640 m) of the line continued via bridges over Foster Street and Birmingham Street to a terminus at the basin east of Lower High Street where a large goods yard was constructed and where goods could be interchanged with the terminus of the Stourbridge Canal. This section, which was used for goods traffic only, opened on 1 January 1880. The GWR branch line itself ended at a level crossing in High Street over which a short private siding continued to Bradley & Co's ironworks.

In 1895 the GWR acquired the former Mersey Wheel and Axle Works located next to the canal, with the two-storey building being converted into a freight handling and storage facility. By the 1920s the Amblecote Goods Depot could handle more than 230 four-wheeled wagons.

== Closure ==
By 1963 a number of sidings had closed including those of Turner & Co, the gas works, and the private siding for Bradley & Co. British Rail announced in 1964 that the Amblecote Goods Depot and Stourbridge Town station were to close under the Beeching Axe. Although they were subsequently delisted, the Goods Depot and branch were nevertheless closed in 1965. The last freight train left the yard on 30 April 1965 and all work there ended on 5 July. Lifting of the track began in September of that year and was completed by October 1967. The bridge over Foster Street was demolished in September 1967, permanently severing the link, with the Birmingham Street bridge also being demolished

The interchange area, including the portion of the canal east of High Street, was then redeveloped as an industrial estate.

A further stretch of line was closed, when Stourbridge Town station was moved back some yards. A bus station was built on the land thus recovered.

The rest of the line survives to this day at the urban railhead.
