= Stourbridge Town branch line =

Railway branch line in Stourbridge, England

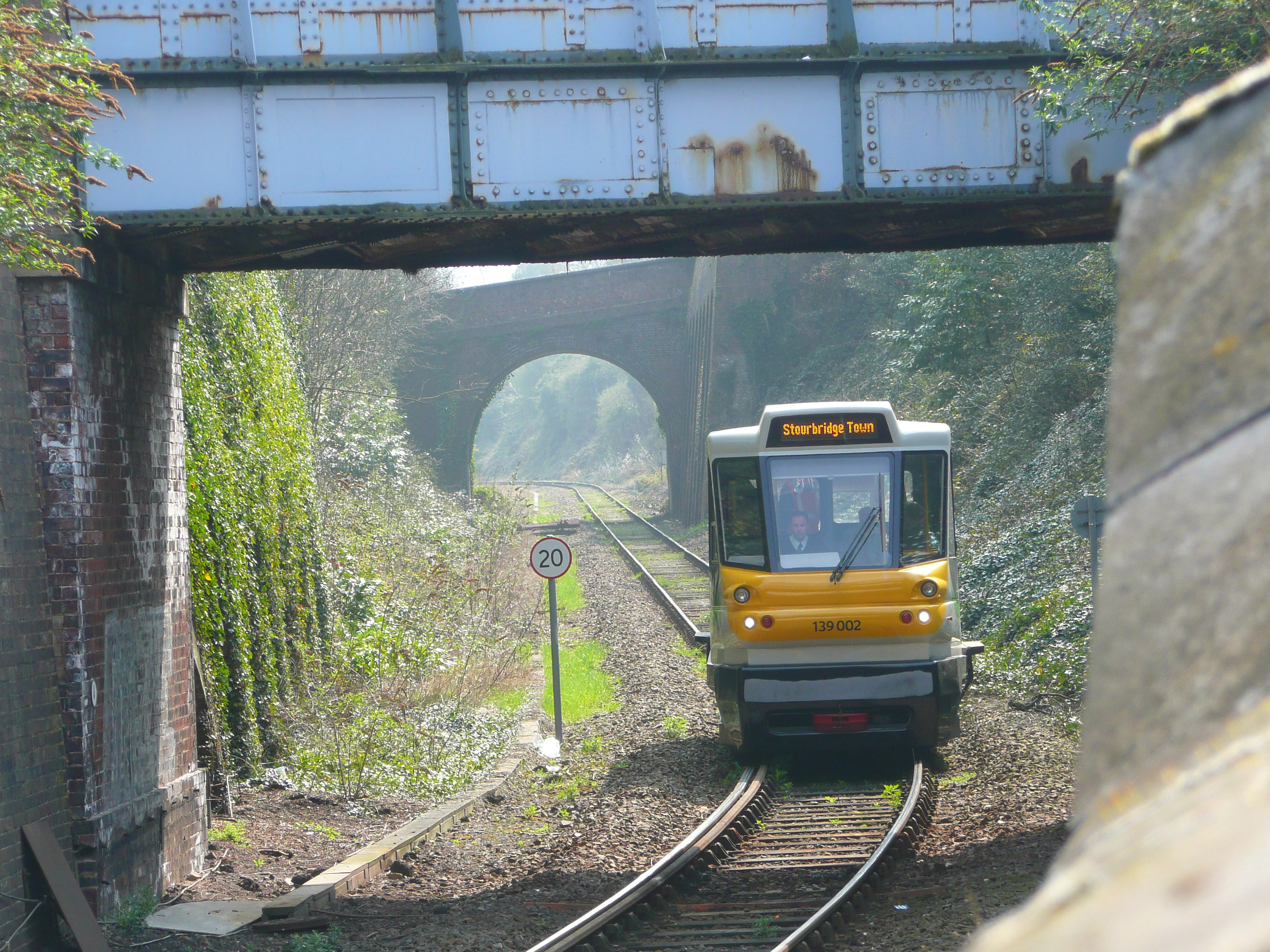
- A Parry People Mover approaching Stourbridge Town station.

Overview
- Owner: Network Rail
- Locale: West Midlands
- Termini: Stourbridge Junction; Stourbridge Town

Service
- Type: Branch line
- Operator: West Midlands Railway
- Rolling stock: Class 139

History
- Opened: 1 October 1879

Technical
- Line length: 0.8 miles (1.3 km)
- Number of tracks: Single track throughout
- Track gauge: 1,435 mm (4 ft 8 1/2 in) standard gauge
Route map
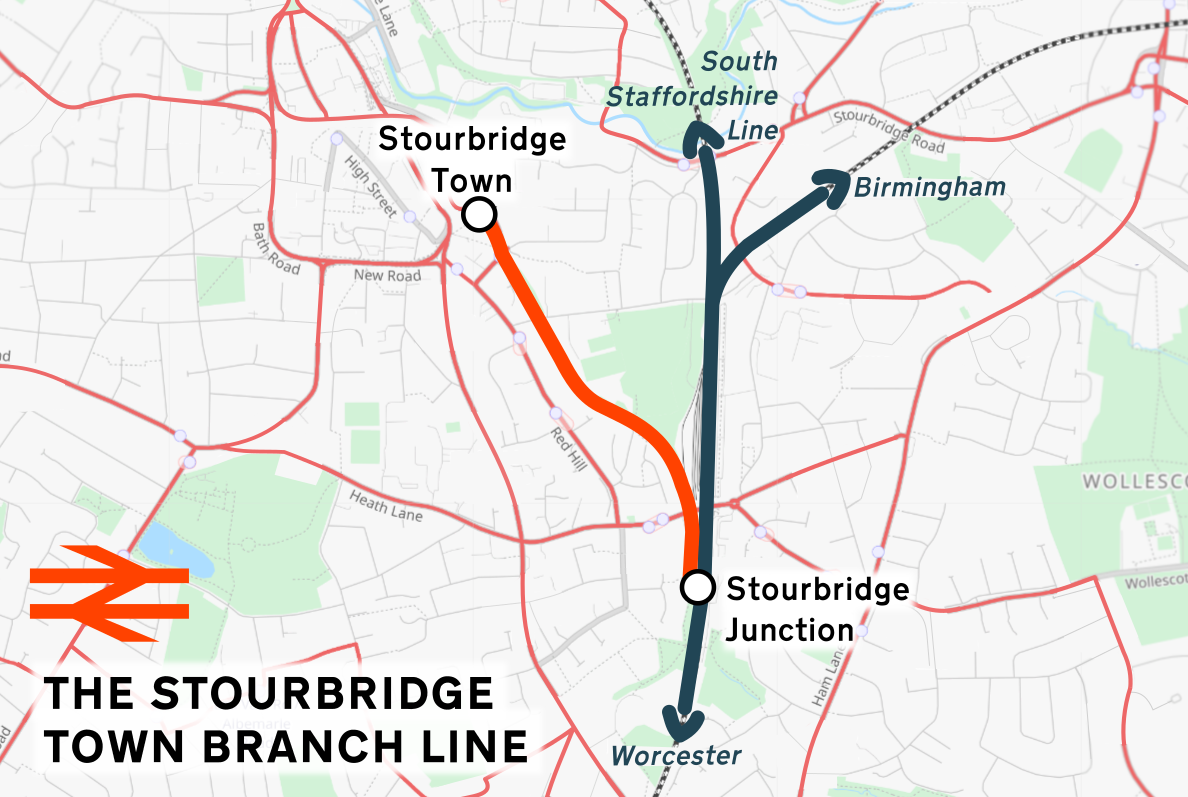
(Click to expand)

The Stourbridge Town branch line is a 0.8-mile (1.3 km) railway branch line, in Stourbridge, West Midlands, England. It is the shortest railway line in Britain. It is sometimes called the shortest line in Europe to host a daily service, although this is incorrect; it is notably beaten by the branch line to Friedrichshafen Hafen, in Germany.

The line, which was originally constructed to provide transshipment with the Stourbridge Town Arm of the Stourbridge Canal, is now solely used for passenger services.

The route is operated by Pre Metro Operations on behalf of West Midlands Trains. It is currently branded as part of the West Midlands Railway sub-brand. Under the previous franchise, which ended on 10 December 2017, the service was branded as the London Midland Stourbridge Shuttle. Service is provided using two Class 139 Parry People Movers.

== History and usage ==
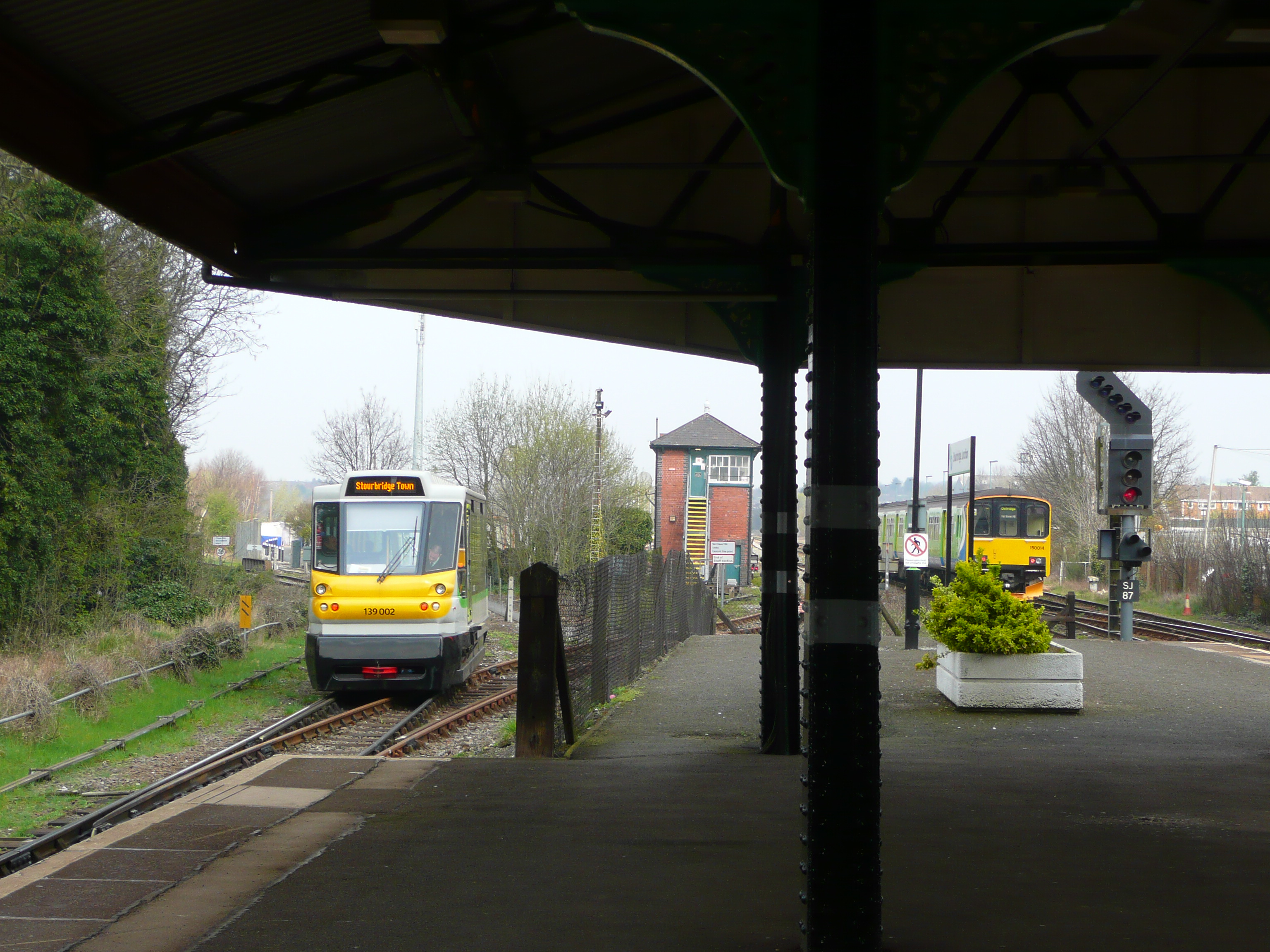
At Stourbridge Junction, trains arrive and depart from platform 1, which is dedicated to the branch. After departure, the branch peels away from the main line, as seen in the left of this photo.

Constructed by the Great Western Railway, the short and steeply inclined branch originally carried both passenger traffic from nearby Stourbridge Junction to the terminus at Stourbridge Town and freight to the Amblecote Goods Depot at Stourbridge Basin. The branch opened for passenger traffic on 1 October 1879 and for goods traffic on 1 January 1880. It briefly closed between April 1915 and February 1919 due to the First World War, but has otherwise remained open since.

Although the branch line was originally double-tracked, after 1935 the two tracks were worked as two parallel single lines, with the non-passenger track used for freight workings beyond the station over a bridge across Foster Street (a bridge rebuilt in 1957 then subsequently demolished in 1967 after the goods branch closed) towards the Stourbridge Basin. (Until the redevelopment of the bus station in 2012, the bridge abutment remained visible in Foster Street.) The station and branch were listed for closure under the Beeching Axe, but were later delisted in 1965.

The goods branch closed in 1965. The 1879 Stourbridge Town station survived mostly intact until February 1979 when it was demolished and the branch cut back by 70 yards (65 metres), leaving room for a bus station.

The line was controlled by traditional semaphore signals until at least 1990, later than the adjacent main line. However, the line is currently worked by the "One Train Working" system with a train staff as authority to occupy the line, and there are no working signals.

In 2021 the whole of the branch received new rail, sleepers and ballast, the first upgrade of the track since 1902.

== Rail traffic on the line ==
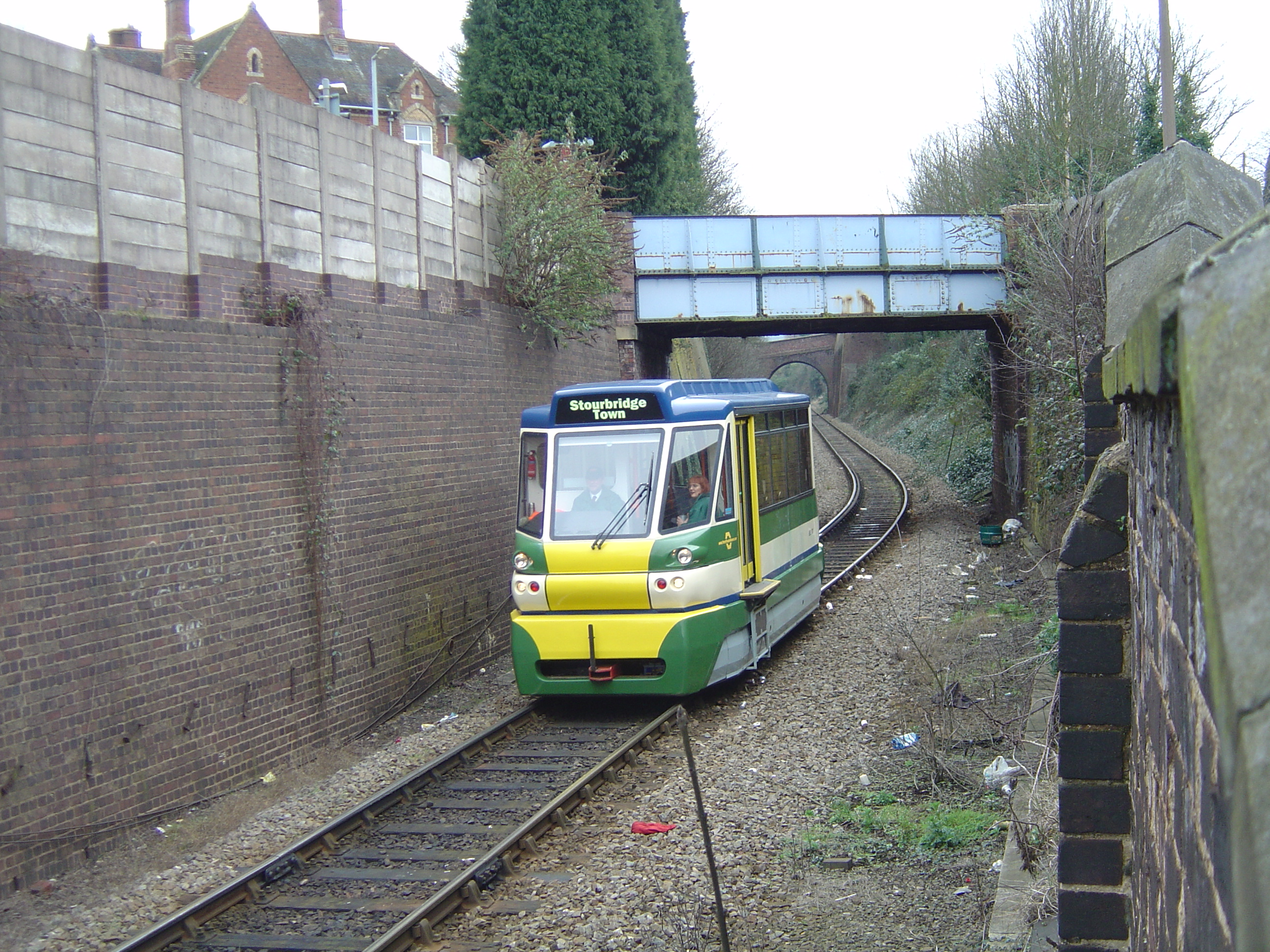
Parry People Mover approaching Stourbridge Town on 12 March 2006

The line has been used several times as the test route for new types of small rail transport. The Great Western Railway used both autotrains and one of the early railcars on this route, and in December 2005 the route began being used to test the Parry People Mover, a highly energy-efficient railcar, to provide the Sunday service. The experiment has been sufficiently successful to the extent that the Sunday service in June 2006 was included in both the Network Rail printed timetables and Internet site, and now runs on a permanent basis.

The line has been operated by two Class 139 Parry People Movers since June 2009. It was previously operated by a single Class 153 car, and prior to that a Class 121, locally known as Daisy the DMU.

Although the line has been threatened with closure several times in the past, People Mover had suggested that should their railcar prove a success, their service could be further extended into Stourbridge town centre as a light rail system. Press reports in August 2010 marked the milestone of half a million passengers having been passed, and indicated substantial growth rates and reliability levels comparable to the Docklands Light Railway; a new depot could consolidate this early success. In 2023 the shuttle celebrated seven million passenger journeys since services began 14 years before.

The train operates six times per hour over the line, with a journey time of three minutes.

== Passenger volume ==
These are the passenger figures on the line from the year beginning April 2002 to the year beginning April 2022. Comparing 2002–2003 to 2019–2020, Stourbridge Town numbers increased by 138% and Stourbridge Junction by 378%.

Station usage
Station name	2002–03	2004–05	2005–06	2006–07	2007–08	2008–09	2009–10	2010–11	2011–12	2012–13	2013–14	2014–15	2015–16	2016–17	2017–18	2018–19	2019–20	2020–21	2021–22	2022–23	2023–24	2024–25
Stourbridge Town	235,402	200,007	233,499	258,700	278,813	540,898	557,502	592,838	471,222	479,516	483,434	497,736	545,700	575,406	634,494	591,502	559,422	158,964	263,548	295,084		
Stourbridge Junction	340,961	370,509	394,422	444,189	499,584	1,138,070	1,159,270	1,206,996	1,149,406	1,216,418	1,276,010	1,323,824	1,434,312	1,466,966	1,585,200	1,667,752	1,631,452	313,080	900,346	1,092,624		
The annual passenger usage is based on sales of tickets in stated financial years from Office of Rail and Road estimates of station usage. The statistics are for passengers arriving and departing from each station and cover twelve-month periods that start in April. Methodology may vary year on year. Usage since the period 2019–20 have been affected by the COVID-19 pandemic, especially the period 2020–23.

== Accidents ==
The branch has become notorious for the steep downhill gradient of 1 in 67 leading from Junction station, and over the years there have been several incidents:

- 15 June 1897 – a train of empty cattle trucks and horse boxes was being reversed down the incline when the locomotive's vacuum brake failed. The locomotive and wagons ploughed into a line of stationary wagons, the office of a local coal merchant, and stables. One man was injured.
- 24 April 1905 – the driver lost control of a locomotive descending the branch, head-first, at the head of 32 wagons. The train demolished the stop block and smashed into and through the goods office at the end of the branch. Luckily the crew managed to jump clear before impact.
- 10 February 1948 – a heavily laden freight train slipped away despite brakes being applied, with the result that wagons telescoped into each other.
- 2 April 1977 – BR Class 122 single-car diesel unit W55012 suffered a brake failure while descending the branch from Stourbridge Junction and crashed through the buffers and the wall beyond, leaving the front part of the train overhanging the road below. This unit is preserved at the Weardale Railway.
- 21 January 1989 – apparently caused by trespassers on the line distracting the driver, who consequently misjudged his braking, class 121 unit W55033 ran through the buffer stops at the end of the line and crashed through the wall beyond. The train was sent out of operation and required an overhaul. This unit is preserved at the Ecclesbourne Valley Railway.
- 1 March 1990 – in a very similar incident to the 1977 crash, brake failure caused class 121 unit W55034 to crash through the rebuilt wall at the end of the line. The buffer stop destroyed in the 1989 crash had not been replaced.

== See also ==
- Princeton Branch - shortest commuter rail line in America
- Vatican Railway - shortest international railway in the world
