= British Rail Class 139 =

British class of lightweight railcars

British Rail Class 139 Parry People Mover
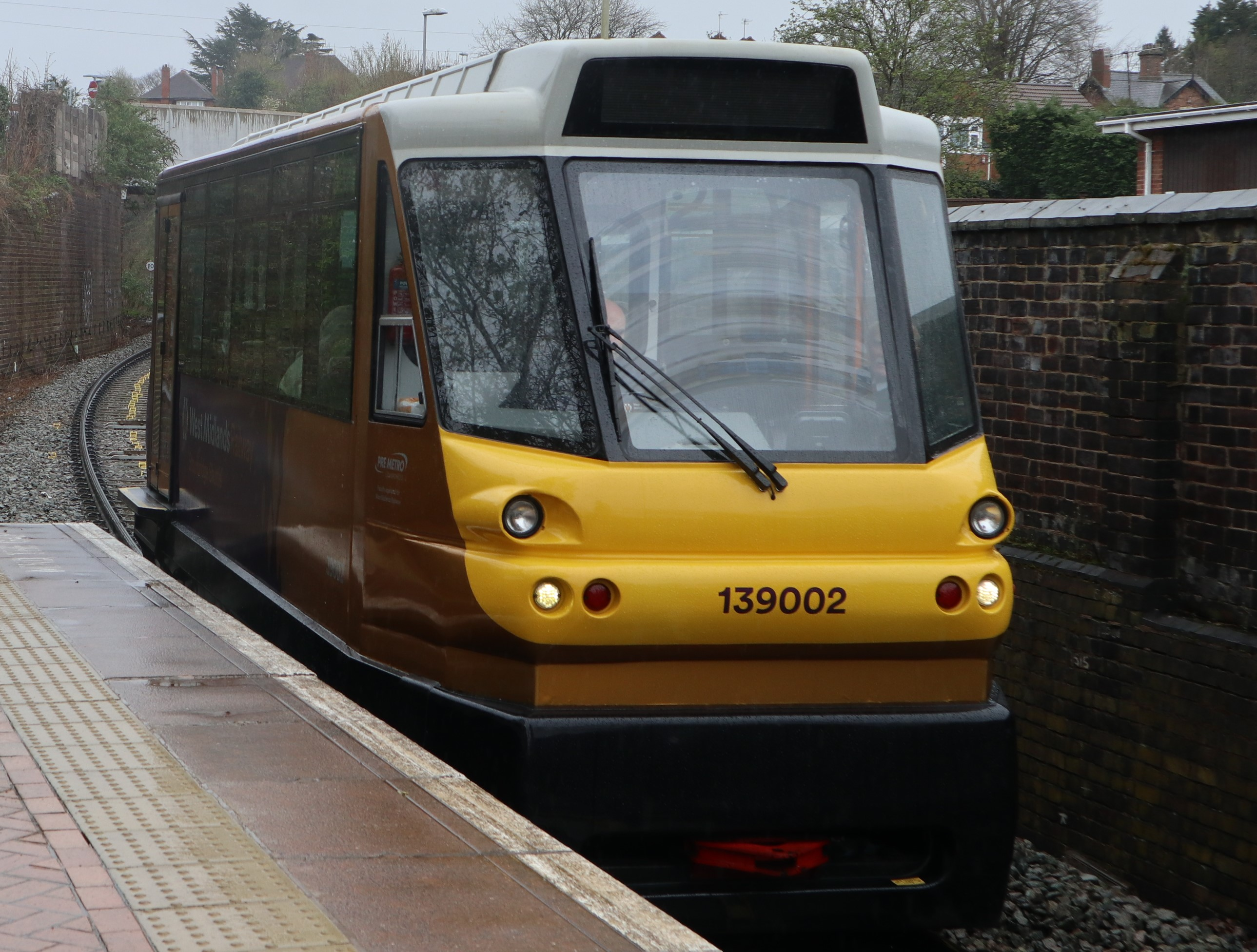
- A West Midlands Trains Class 139 approaches Stourbridge Town in 2023

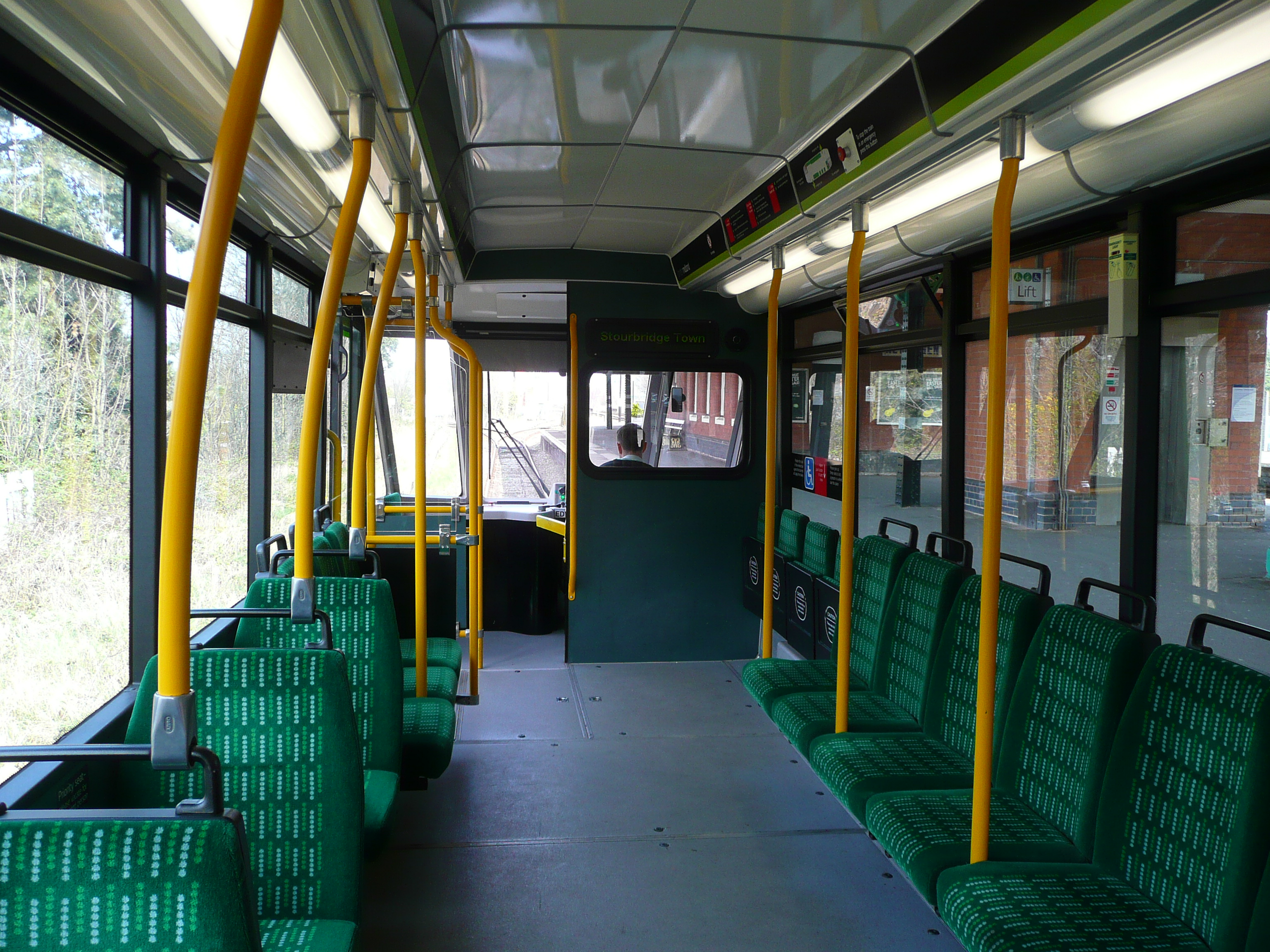
- The interior of a London Midland Class 139
- In service: June 2009–present
- Manufacturer: Parry People Movers
- Family name: PPM
- Replaced: Class 153
- Number built: 3
- Formation: 1 car
- Capacity: 20–25 seated, 30–35 standing
- Operator: West Midlands Trains
- Depot: Stourbridge
- Line served: Stourbridge Town branch line

Specifications
- Car body construction: Stainless steel frame
- Car length: 8.7 m (28 ft 6 1/2 in) (139 012); 9.6 m (31 ft 6 in) (139 001–002)
- Width: 2.4 m (7 ft 10 1/2 in)
- Height: 3.2 m (10 ft 6 in)
- Wheel diameter: 610 mm (24 in)
- Maximum speed: 32 km/h (20 mph) (as in service)
- Weight: 12 t (11.8 long tons; 13.2 short tons) (139 012)
- Traction system: Flywheel (1,000–2,600 rpm)
- Prime mover: Ford DSG423 2.3 L (140 cu in)
- Power output: 86 hp (64 kW)
- Track gauge: 1,435 mm (4 ft 8 1/2 in) standard gauge

British Rail Class 139 is the TOPS classification for PPM60 model lightweight railcars, built by Parry People Movers for use on the National Rail network. The class was originally built in 2008 for operation on the Stourbridge Town branch line, following an extensive trial with a prototype registered as a Class 999 unit. The first newly constructed Class 139 was shown on 28 June 2008 at the Tyseley Locomotive Works open day. The full fleet of two units entered public service on the branch line in June 2009.

== Technology ==
The Class 139 units are typical of the Parry People Movers concept, in that they utilise flywheel energy storage to recapture and supply the motive force for moving the vehicle. The flywheel captures the vehicle's kinetic energy when the brakes are used, and re-uses the energy for acceleration. This eliminates the need for a large diesel engine. The small onboard engine (fuelled by LPG) is used to initially bring the flywheel up to speed, to add speed to the flywheel after the vehicle is started in motion, and to provide power for the onboard systems.

== Usage ==
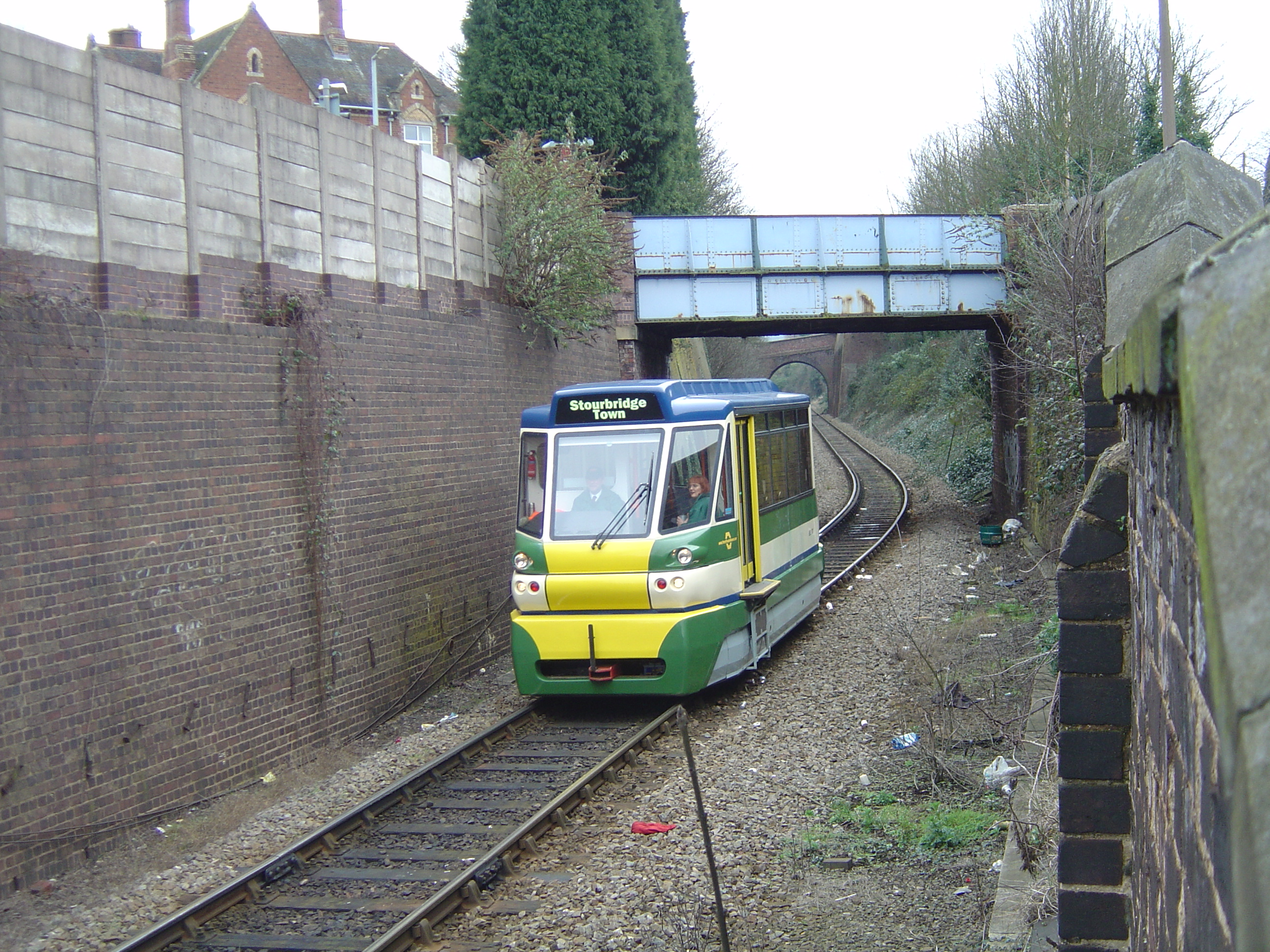
Approaching Stourbridge Town in 2006

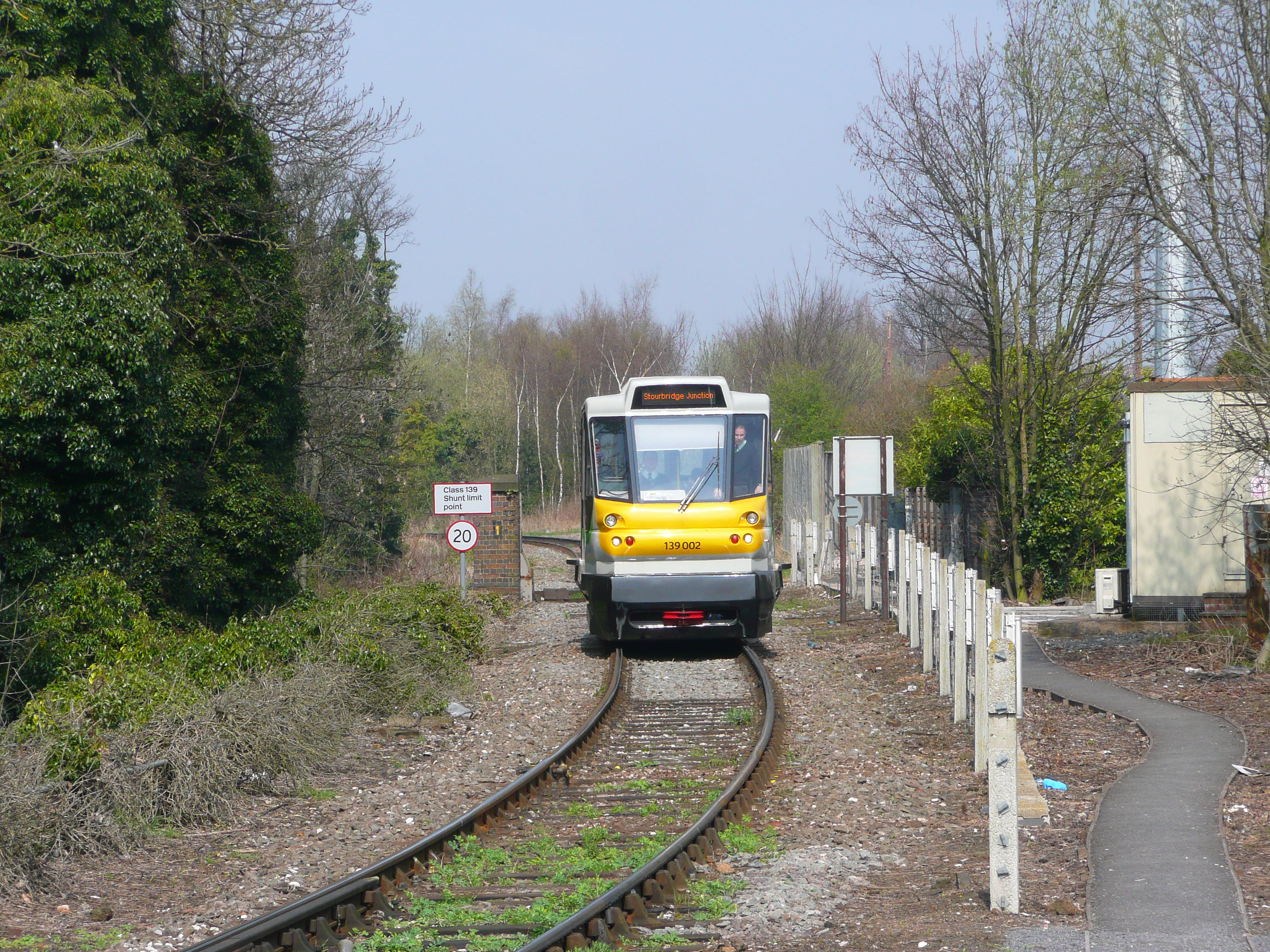
Approaching Stourbridge Junction

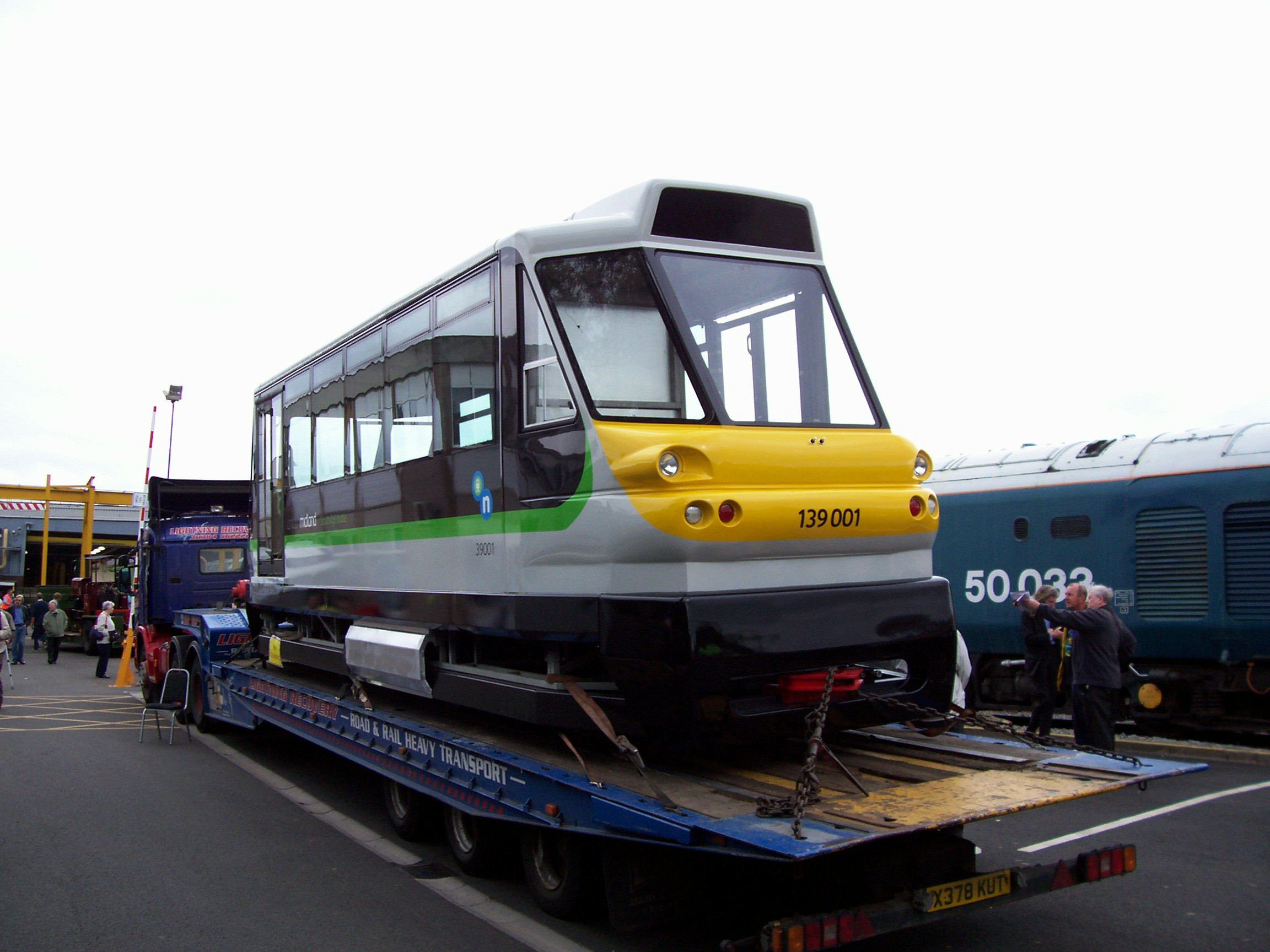
On display at Tyseley in 2008

The concept of using the lightweight railcar dates from 2006, when a year-long pilot scheme began on the Stourbridge Town branch line on Sundays, using a PPM50 unit constructed in 2002 and numbered as 999 900 under TOPS. The success of this trial led to the provision of regular services using the technology in the franchise plans for the new West Midlands franchise. Following the award of the franchise to London Midland, it placed an order for two PPM60 units with Parry People Movers, through Porterbrook leasing, with the service itself operated by Pre Metro Operations.

These two units are 139 001 and 139 002 under TOPS, composed of vehicle numbers 39001 and 39002 in the British carriage and wagon numbering and classification system. The vehicles are mechanically similar to 999 900, but are approximately 0.9 m (2 ft 11 in) longer. They were intended to start operating on the Stourbridge Town branch in 2008. In January 2009, it was confirmed that 139001 was still undergoing testing at Chasewater Railway and 139002 was still not completed.

Despite the difficulties in the commissioning of the two Class 139 units, London Midland consistently outlined its faith that they would be ready to enter service. In March 2009, it was announced that the first unit had received its passenger certification from Network Rail, allowing it to carry passengers. London Midland said it would begin a phased entry into service, starting with weekend operation in April, leading up to a full service by the timetable change in May 2009. Until then, London Midland temporarily returned a Class 153 to operating the branch service.

Unit 139 002 officially entered service on 29 March 2009 as part of the type's phased entry. This unit had previously worked in full service, including all-day on Monday 11 May 2009 and previously had worked all morning services during February/March 2009. In May 2009, the first unit, 139 001, was finally delivered to Stourbridge, with 999 900 removed at the same time. Test unit 999 900 had been on the branch line between 2005–2009. At the point of introduction, they displaced a single Class 153 DMU that was previously allocated to the branch line. By December 2009, the 200,000th passenger had been carried by the railcars.

In 2010, a trial service was planned between the Mid-Hants Railway, a heritage line in Hampshire, and Go-Op, a planned open access operator, which would see the former 999 900 restored to its original designation as Parry Car No. 12, operate peak time trains between Medstead and Four Marks and Alton, intended to connect with South West Trains services to London in the morning and from London in the evening. Problems with the vehicle during testing meant that this project was postponed. As a consequence, the vehicle, since purchased by Lightweight Community Transport, underwent a major rebuild to bring it up to Class 139 standard; it was renumbered as 139 000, then later 139 012.

=== Other interest and proposals ===
One pre-qualified franchise bidder in the 2012 round included the procurement of Class 139s in its franchise bid; however, it was not successful.

Parry People Movers used London Midland's operation of the Class 139 to promote the concept for other lines that are short and essentially separate from the main railway network as a means of reintroducing rail travel to areas that have seen it curtailed. PPM proposed a variation of the PPM60, to be known as PPM220, to bid for the contract to build a small fleet of experimental tram-trains for use on the Penistone Line, and for the new generation DMUs intended as part of the government's rolling stock plan. This would have been an articulated unit, with a pair of PPM60 variants at either end, capable of accommodating up to 220 passengers and travel at up to 60 miles per hour (100 km/h) on railways or 50 miles per hour (80 km/h) on tramways. The Penistone trial, however, was cancelled before a bidder was selected. With Lightweight Community Transport, Parry People Movers developed concepts for a four–axle bogie vehicle with a more powerful diesel engine and greater passenger capacity, intending to market it as the flagship product for use on branch lines. These proposals were unsuccessful in finding buyers, and PPM ceased operating following the death of its founder and director in 2023.

== Fleet details ==
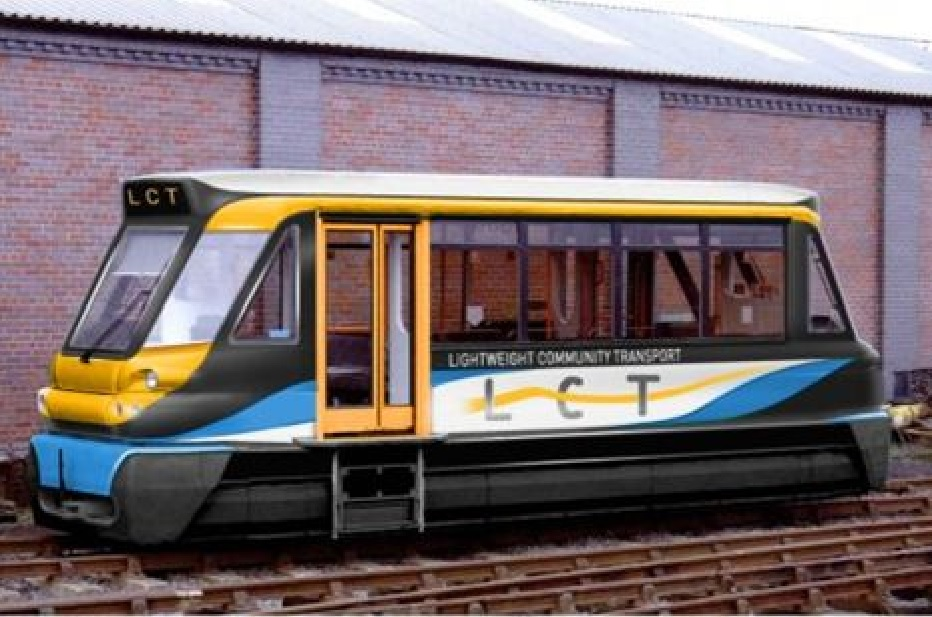
The Lightweight Community Transport Class 139

Class	Operator	No. built	Year built	Car	Unit nos	Notes
139/0	Lightweight Community Transport	1	2002; 2011 (rebuild)	1	139012	Formerly 139000, and originally 999900
139/0	West Midlands Trains	2	2008	1	139001 – 139002	

=== Named units ===
Both units have received a name:

- 139001: The Stourbridge Lion
- 139002: George The Station Cat

== See also ==
- Coventry Very Light Rail
