= Stourbridge Interchange =

Transport interchange in Stourbridge, England

Coordinates: 52.4560°N 2.1426°W

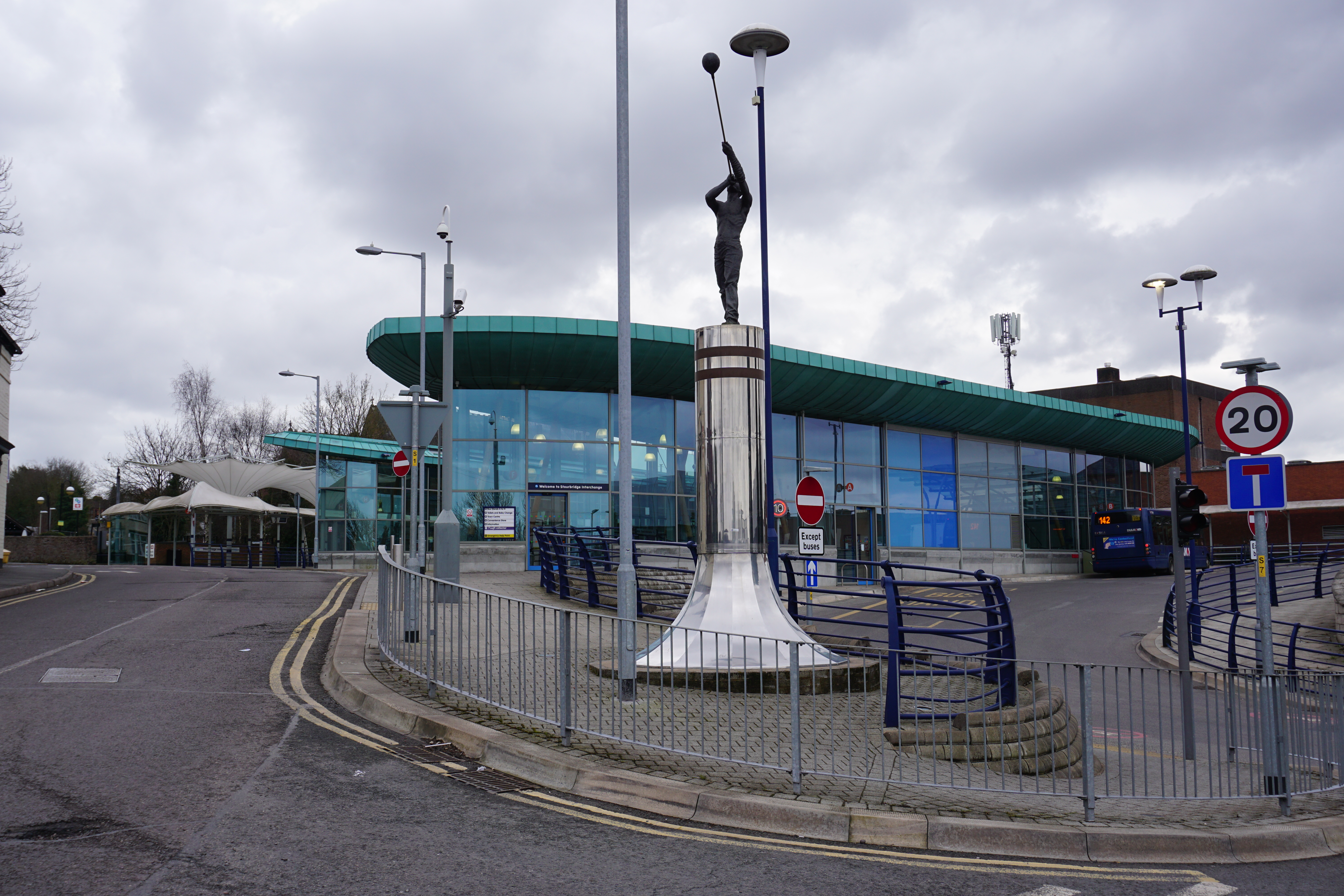
The Stourbridge Interchange

Stourbridge Interchange is a bus station in Stourbridge, England, on the site of an earlier bus station. The bus station site partly occupies the location of the original Stourbridge railway station which was demolished in 1979. Until 1967 the railway line continued to Stourbridge Canal Basin when this section of the line was closed and subsequently lifted. The original bus station used until 1979 exists as a car park next to the Interchange.

The new name of 'Stourbridge Interchange', came about because of the adjacent local railway station, where passengers can interchange to train services. The redeveloped interchange opened on 22 April 2012. The old bus station closed on Sunday 24 October 2010 and temporary bus stops were put in place. There was a free bus service, operated by National Express West Midlands, which took passengers from the temporary bus stops into Stourbridge town centre.

== Design ==
The new station is designed to resemble other bus stations in the region, such as the newly finished Wolverhampton bus station and the Halesowen bus station. Stourbridge Interchange includes indoor waiting areas and a new facilities building including a help desk and toilets. The new station was developed on the site of the old bus station, which is located just off the Stourbridge ring road.

The interchange features a mosaic artwork, Cameo, by local artist Steve Field, which makes use of anamorphic columns and includes images based on cameo glass from the nearby Broadfield House Glass Museum.

The bus station has nine stands.
