= Stourbridge Junction railway station =

Railway station in the West Midlands, England

Stourbridge Junction
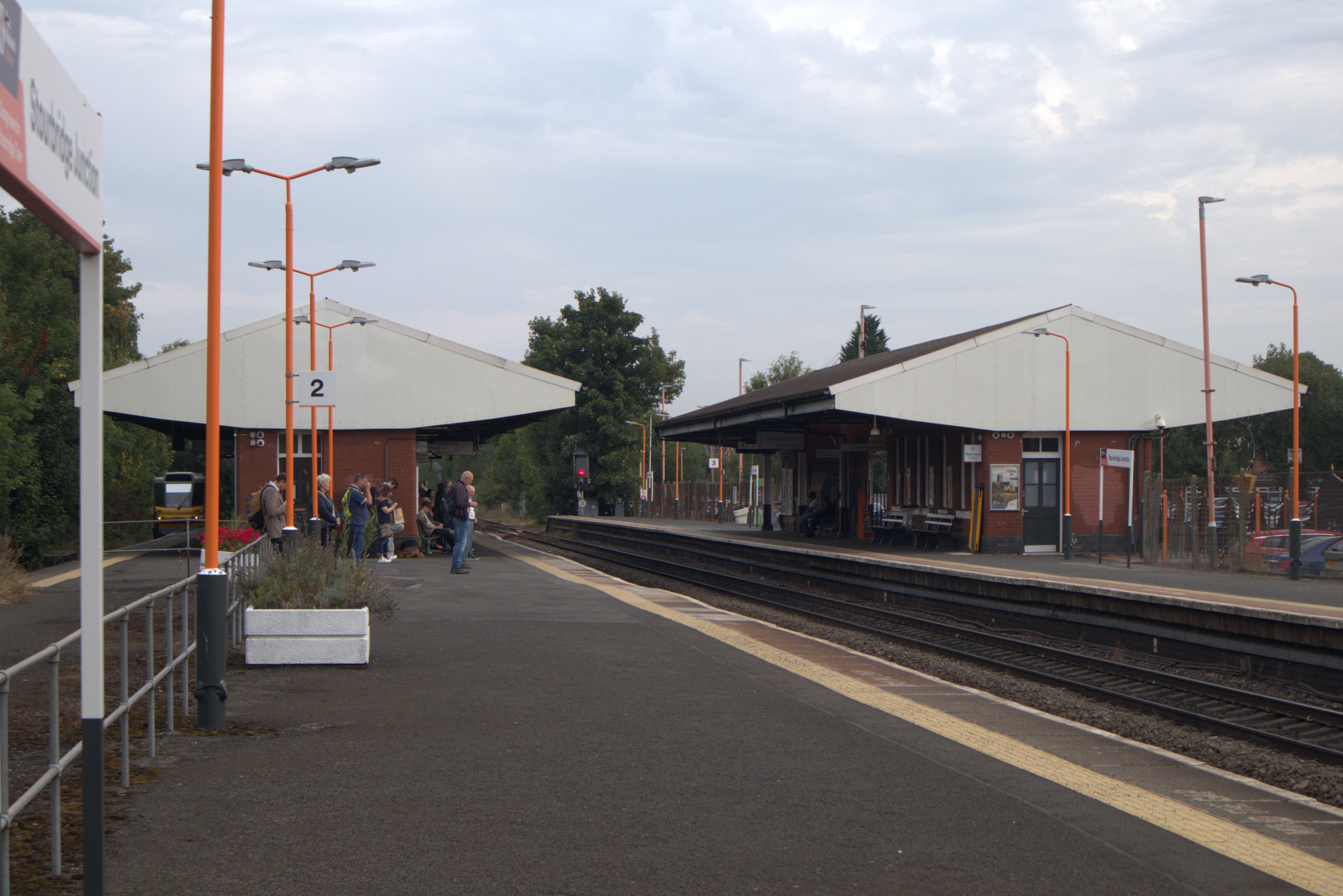
- Stourbridge Junction in 2024

General information
- Location: Stourbridge, Dudley; England
- Coordinates: 52.448°N 2.134°W
- Grid reference: SO909833
- Manager: West Midlands Railway
- Transit authority: Transport for West Midlands
- Platforms: 3

Other information
- Station code: SBJ
- Fare zone: 5
- Classification: DfT category D

History
- Original company: Oxford, Worcester and Wolverhampton Railway
- Pre-grouping: Great Western Railway
- Post-grouping: Great Western Railway

Key dates
- 1 May 1852: First station opened as Stourbridge
- 1 October 1879: Renamed Stourbridge Junction; line to Stourbridge Town opens
- 1 October 1901: Station resited

Passengers
- 2021/22: ▲0.900 million
- Interchange: ▲0.224 million
- 2022/23: ▲1.093 million
- Interchange: ▲0.238 million
- 2023/24: ▲1.262 million
- Interchange: ▲0.304 million
- 2024/25: ▲1.472 million
- Interchange: ▲0.320 million
- 2025/26: ▲1.647 million
- Interchange: ▲0.355 million
Location
Notes
- Passenger statistics from the Office of Rail and Road

Stourbridge Junction is one of two railway stations serving the town of Stourbridge, in the Metropolitan Borough of Dudley in the West Midlands, England. It lies on the Birmingham to Worcester via Kidderminster Line and is the junction for the Stourbridge Town Branch Line, said to be the shortest operational branch line in Europe. The other station serving Stourbridge is Stourbridge Town at the end of the branch line.

== History ==
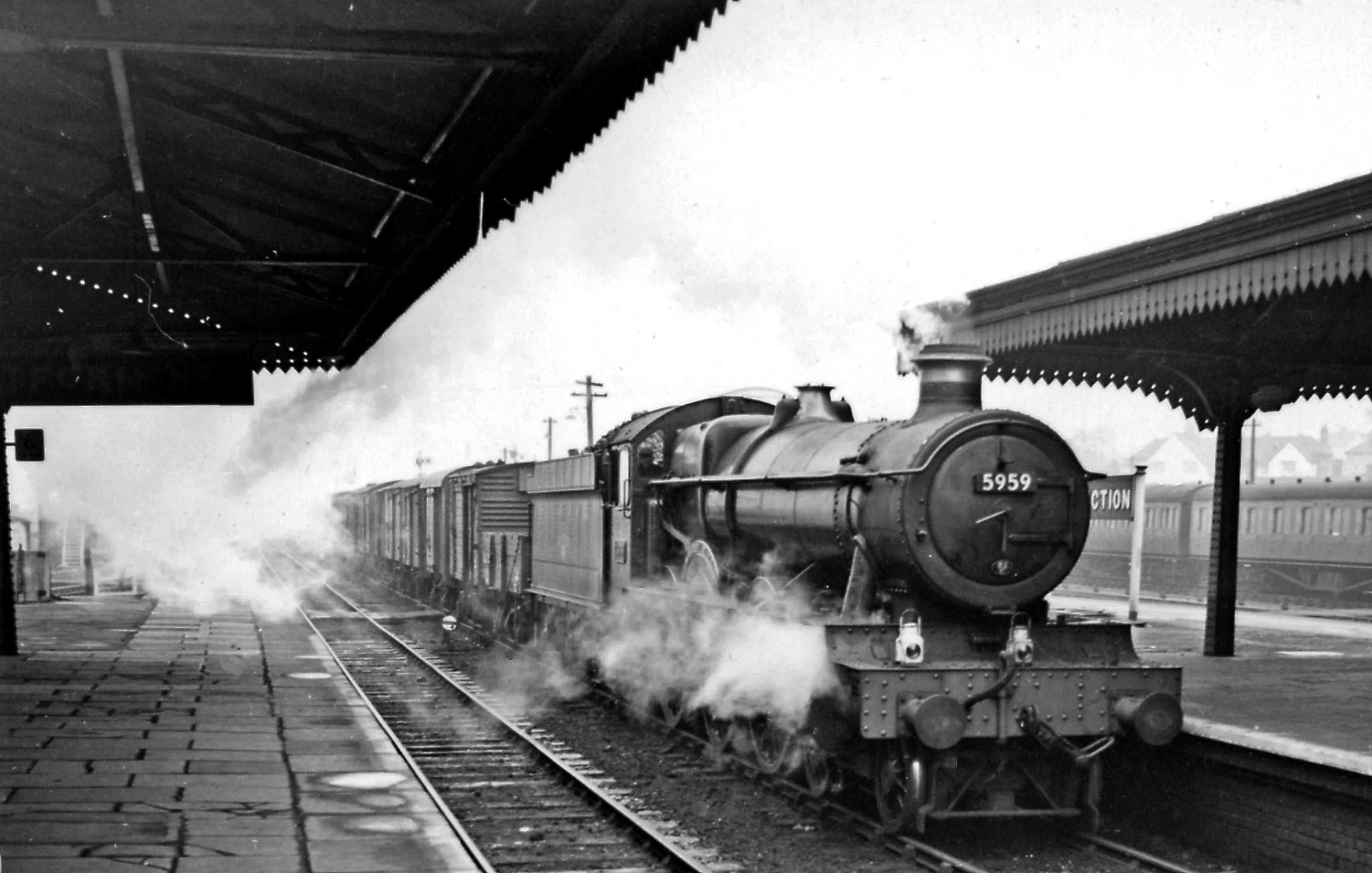
The station in 1958

The station was opened in 1852 on the Oxford, Worcester and Wolverhampton Railway (OWW) line, at a slightly different location from the present station, under the name of Stourbridge. The junction came about when the Stourbridge Railway built their line to Lye and beyond.

Stourbridge became a double junction on 1 October 1879 when the branch to Stourbridge Town and goods was opened. It was at this time that the station changed its name from Stourbridge to Stourbridge Junction.

The new station 400 yards (370 m) to the south (towards Kidderminster) of the original costing £100,000 (equivalent to £10,630,000 in 2025) was opened on 1 October 1901 by J.E. Jones, vice-chairman of Stourbridge Council. The traffic at this time comprised 150 passenger trains and 200 luggage trains per day.

The line south to Kidderminster was closed for nine days in 2026 due to a wildfire next to the track. Services from Birmingham Snow Hill terminated at Stourbridge Junction.

=== Accidents and incidents ===
On 17 February 1902 the 1.12pm passenger train from Wolverhampton to London was approaching Stourbridge Junction when it ran into a light engine which was standing at the home signal at Stourbridge Junction North signal box. Nine passengers were injured, and the driver and fireman of the light engine and the guard of the passenger train were cut or bruised. The report by Lieutenant Col. H.A. Yorke R.E. found that the blame lay on the signalman who forgot that there was an engine at the home signal and accepted the passenger train without checking that the line was clear.

On 9 July 1920 a light engine (No. 497) collided with a goods train hauled by an 0-6-0 freight locomotive (No. 1015) injuring the guard of the goods train and derailing the brake van and eight goods wagons.

On Thursday 2 April 1931 a passenger train from Birmingham collided with three empty stationary coaches at the station. The train was running into the relief platform when the driver suddenly spotted the stationary coaches which had formed part of a local train earlier in the evening. The first of the three stationary coaches was completely destroyed and the other two were badly damaged. A few passengers on the passenger train received minor injuries.

=== Cuts under the Beeching Report ===
In 1962, the OWW was closed to passenger traffic north of Stourbridge by the British Transport Commission, although the route remained open for freight until 1993. Only the section as far as the Round Oak Steel Terminal is still in use.

All through services to Birmingham were diverted from Snow Hill to Birmingham New Street in 1967 in the wake of the Beeching Report, but mostly reverted to their previous route following the reopening of the Smethwick Junction to Snow Hill line in 1995. Certain Birmingham – Worcester/Hereford trains calling here continued to use the connection onto the Stour Valley line at Galton Junction until the May 2004 timetable change, but there are now no timetabled direct services to New Street and passengers wishing to access main line services there must either change at Galton Bridge or make the transfer between Snow Hill or Moor St & New Street on foot.

The station used to have four platforms, comprising two island platforms. The southern divergence to Platform 1 was removed some years ago and Platform 4, situated opposite to the current Platform 3, now faces the car park – built on the station's old carriage sidings.

The station's signalbox closed on 24 August 2012, as part of a wider network modernisation programme to centralise signalling operations. The signals at the station are now controlled from the West Midlands Signalling Centre in Saltley, Birmingham.

| Preceding station | Disused railways | Following station |
|---|---|---|
| Brettell Lane | Oxford, Worcester and Wolverhampton Railway; Later Great Western Railway, then British Rail; Oxford–Worcester–Wolverhampton (1852–1962) | Hagley |
| Brettell Lane | Great Western Railway "The Wombourne Branch" (1925–1932) | Terminus |
| Brettell Lane | South Staffordshire Railway; Later LNWR, then LMS, finally BR; South Staffs Line Dudley–Stourbridge Junction Section (1852–1962) | Terminus |

=== Stourbridge depot ===
On construction, the OWW built a small servicing depot just north of the station on the route to Wolverhampton. The GWR intended to improve this, but were delayed by the outbreak of World War I until 1926, when they built a new standard pattern single roundhouse with coaling/watering and light maintenance facilities, situated 0.5 miles (0.80 km) north of the station, just north of the A458 Birmingham Street. The depot was allocated with mainly local service tank engines, such as Prairies and Panniers, with a small allocation of dedicated freight types. The original OWW shed was later used to house railmotors and diesel railcars. With the Beeching Report implemented, both depots closed in July 1966 and were demolished, with the land used for housing.

Today the yard to the north of the station is home to a Light Maintenance Depot used by Chiltern Railways. This is used to stable stock for the peak services from Stourbridge, and is occasionally used to stable engineering vehicles. The land at the south end of platform 1 has a shed for the two Class 139 units that serve the Stourbridge Town branch.

== Services ==
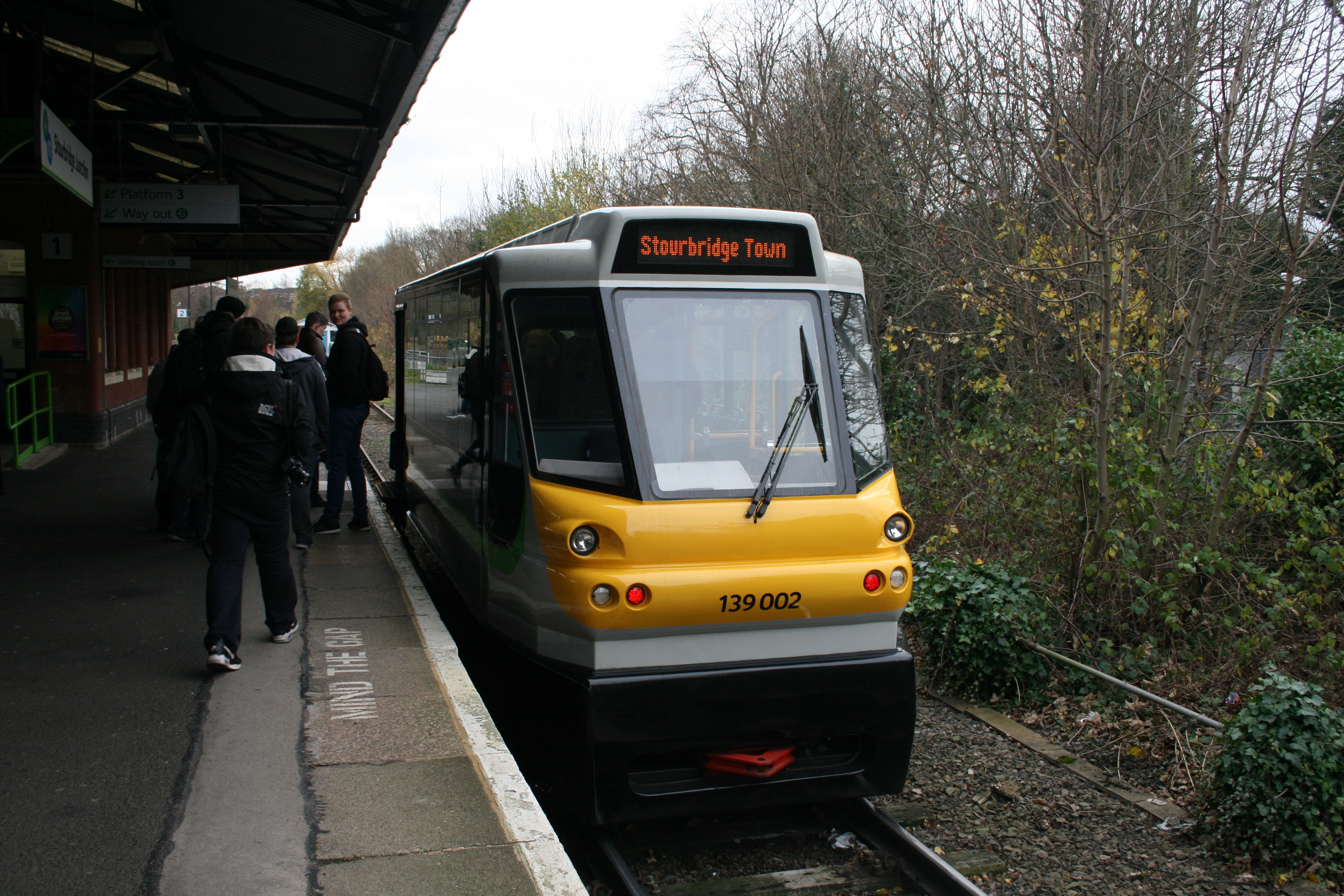
A London Midland Class 139 at Stourbridge Junction in 2015

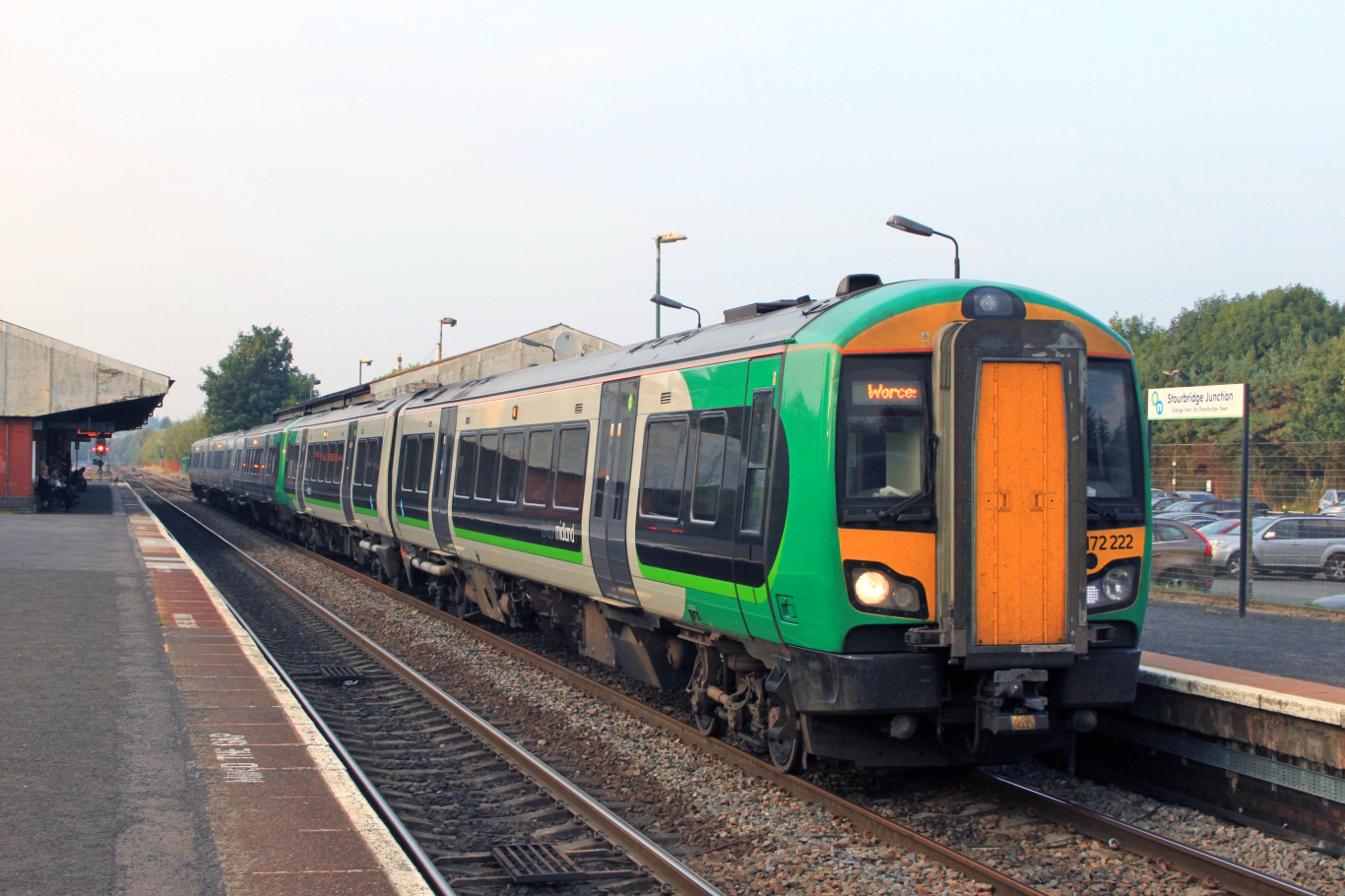
A London Midland Class 172 at Stourbridge Junction operating a service to Worcester

=== West Midlands Trains ===
The majority of services from Stourbridge Junction are operated by West Midlands Trains, using Class 172 diesel multiple units. They usually run 4 trains per hour to Birmingham Snow Hill via Smethwick Galton Bridge. 2 of these per hour extend to Stratford-upon-Avon, and 1 each to Dorridge and Whitlocks End. Four trains per hour also run to Kidderminster, with 2tph continuing to Worcester Foregate Street or Worcester Shrub Hill. Some services to Birmingham continue to Leamington Spa in the evening peak. Services in the West Midlands county are often subsidised by Network West Midlands.

Trains operating from the Junction to Stourbridge Town are currently being run by Class 139 units. One of two units operates a shuttle service every ten minutes between the stations. This is instead every 15 minutes on Sundays. The service is called the Stourbridge Shuttle, and is operated by Pre Metro Operations, in partnership with West Midlands Railway. The Shuttle is renowned for being one of the shortest branch line services in Europe at 3/4 of a mile long.

=== Chiltern Railways ===
The station is served by one southbound Chiltern Railways service Monday to Friday, a 06:14 service to London Marylebone via Birmingham Snow Hill. This ran to/from Kidderminster from September 2002 to May 2023.

On Saturdays and Sundays two services head southbound to Marylebone in the mornings. Three trains return here with a service from London on Mondays to Friday evenings, with two each on Saturdays & Sundays.

=== Other operators ===
The station often sees special charter trains or stock movements to the Severn Valley Railway at Kidderminster, and three CrossCountry services – one early morning and two late evening – are timetabled to run through, but not call at, Stourbridge Junction. The line is also used as a diversionary route for the Cross Country Route between Birmingham New Street and Cheltenham Spa.

| Preceding station | National Rail | Following station |
|---|---|---|
| Hagley | West Midlands Railway Stratford–Whitlocks End–Kidderminster | Cradley Heath |
| Kidderminster | West Midlands Railway Stratford–Dorridge–Worcester | Lye |
| Terminus | Chiltern Railways London–Stourbridge | Lye |
| Terminus | West Midlands Railway Stourbridge Town branch line | Stourbridge Town |

=== Freight ===
There are usually three steel trains per day each way to and from Round Oak Steel Terminal. Other services that run when required are: a scrap steel service and a stone service from Croft to Brierley Hill which operate on Fridays; and a nuclear flask train which operates from Bridgwater to Crewe. There are several other freight trains which use the line through the station on a regular basis.

== Future proposals and West Midlands Metro extension ==
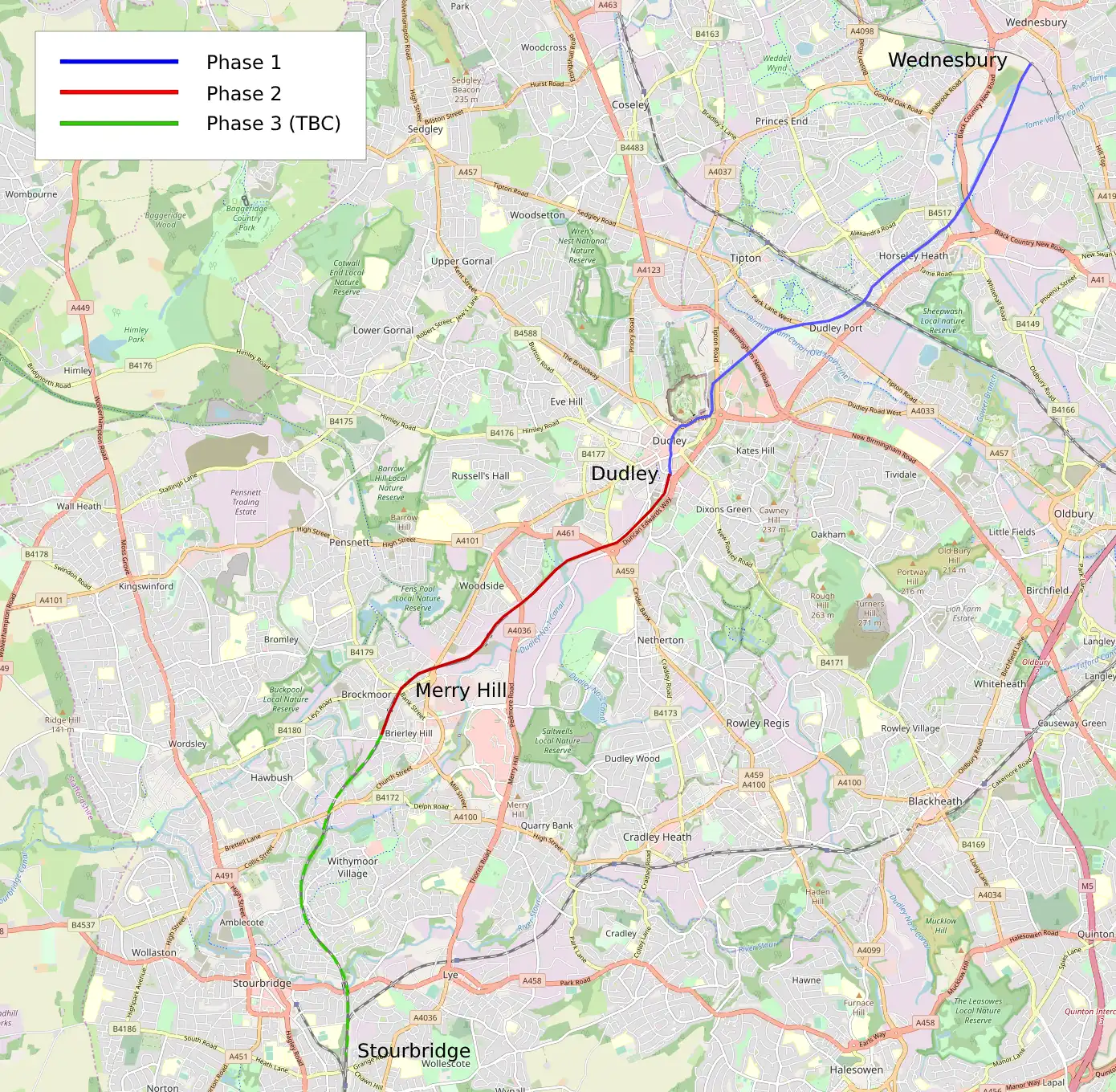
Line 2 extension plan- Wednesbury–Brierley Hill (incl. Stourbridge)

Since 2010, plans have existed to reintroduce services on part of the disused Oxford, Worcester and Wolverhampton Railway (OWW) from Stourbridge Junction to Brierley Hill. Services would be operated by similar PPM stock that is used to Stourbridge Town, or the branch route may be expanded, these plans were later paused in place of the West Midlands Metro extension.

In 2012 the extension of the West Midlands Metro to from Wednesbury to Brierley hill had been given the go ahead.

Due to funding constraints, it was decided to terminate Line 2 in Brierley Hill, and later Stourbridge, with the first section from Wednesbury to Dudley opening first. In early 2017, work began to clear vegetation and disused track from the former railway line. The estimated cost of Line 2 is now £449 million.

In 2021, large funding was given to the West Midlands Metro, and the extension to Stourbridge Town Centre & Stourbridge Junction was confirmed to be under development / planning. However, there is no estimated date of construction or completion. Once complete, trams will run on 3 lines to Walsall, Wolverhampton & Digbeth (in Central Birmingham)
