= Stourbridge Town railway station =

Railway station in the West Midlands, England

Stourbridge Town
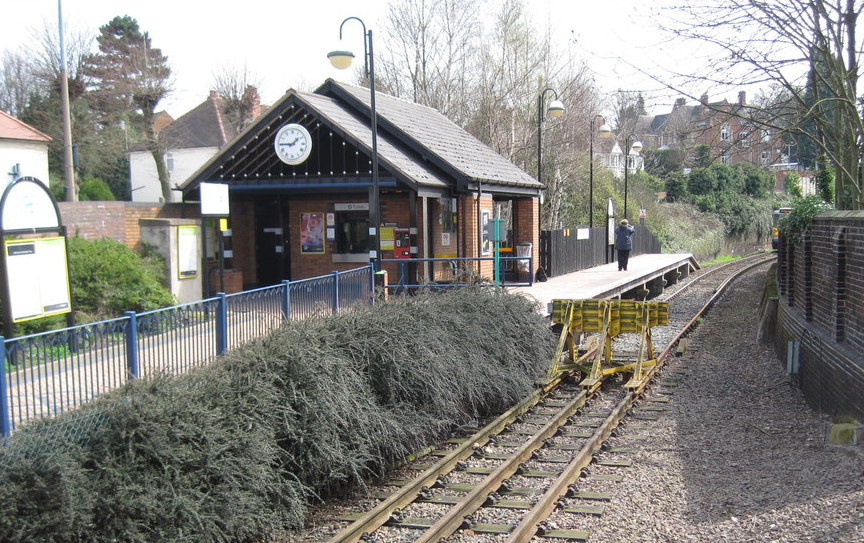
- Stourbridge Town railway station

General information
- Location: Stourbridge, Dudley; England
- Coordinates: 52.455°N 2.142°W
- Grid reference: SO904842
- Manager: West Midlands Railway
- Transit authority: Transport for West Midlands
- Platforms: 1

Other information
- Station code: SBT
- Fare zone: 5
- Classification: DfT category E

History
- Original company: Stourbridge Railway
- Pre-grouping: Great Western Railway
- Post-grouping: Great Western Railway

Key dates
- 1 October 1879: First station opened
- 29 March 1915: Closed
- 3 March 1919: Reopened
- 18 February 1979: Resited
- 10 January 1994: Closed
- 19 April 1994: Reopened on third site

Passengers
- 2021/22: ▲0.264 million
- 2022/23: ▲0.295 million
- 2023/24: ▲0.346 million
- 2024/25: ▲0.379 million
- 2025/26: ▲0.424 million
Location
Notes
- Passenger statistics from the Office of Rail and Road

Stourbridge Town is a railway station in the town of Stourbridge, West Midlands, England. It is situated at the end of the Stourbridge Town branch line linking the station with Stourbridge Junction, 0.8 miles away, where passengers can change for mainline train services. It is said to be the shortest operational branch railway line in Europe.

== History ==
It opened to passenger traffic on Wednesday 1 October 1879, Stourbridge Town was built because it was considered that the existing station at Stourbridge Junction was situated too far from Stourbridge town centre. The original station, built of white brick with courses of stone, and red and blue brick, situated upon the site now occupied by Stourbridge bus station, was a surprisingly grand affair, with one 298 ft (91 m) platform paved with ornamental blue bricks and substantial brick buildings covered by a full-length awning of wood and glass on an iron framework. The building comprised a first and second-class ladies’ waiting room, third-class ladies’ waiting room, first and second-class general waiting room, third-class general waiting room, a parcels and clock room, lamp room and offices. The booking office was in the centre of the block of rooms between the two general waiting rooms, in each of which was a ticket portal.

The station was closed as a wartime economy measure between 1 April 1915 and 3 March 1919, with passenger services being replaced by Midland Red buses. During the General Strike in 1926, the bus service between Junction and Town stations was re-introduced from 7 May to 10 July to cover for the withdrawn train services.

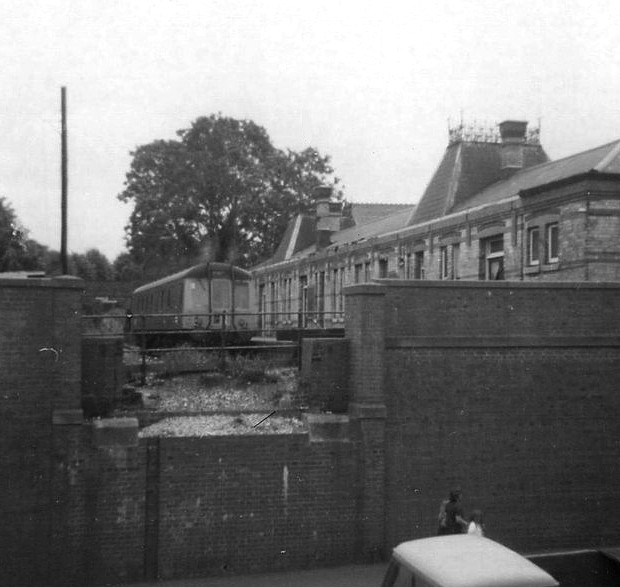
The original station in 1977, two years before demolition.

The station and branch were listed for closure in 1964 under the Beeching axe, but won a stay of execution in 1965, although the station lost its parcels service and became unstaffed from July 1967. The 1879 station survived mostly intact until February 1979 when it was demolished.

In 1979, the branch was cut back by 70 yards (64 m) towards Junction station, leaving room for a bus station. The new station was a low-cost portable building built by British Rail and artifacts from the old station were acquired by the Birmingham Railway Museum for their depot at Tyseley.

Despite threats and rumours of closure in the 1980s and 1990s, the station building was replaced in early 1994, with a new station opening to passengers on 25 April 1994. The current station is a small modern facility directly linked to the bus station allowing easy interchange with bus services at this urban railhead. It has a single 170 ft (52 m) platform which is more than long enough to hold a single car Class 153 railcar, which formerly shuttled passengers between the station and Stourbridge Junction; the line now uses two Class 139 people mover-type cars. Due to the nature of the gradient, there is a short section of rails behind the initial buffer stop to prevent accidents such as those which occurred in 1989 and 1990. This runs parallel to the station pathway, and is surrounded by a wall and railings for safety reasons.

== Services ==
The shuttle service to Stourbridge Junction runs every ten minutes on weekdays and Saturdays, and every fifteen minutes on Sundays. All services are operated by PRE Metro Operations but are branded as West Midlands Railway. 100% of trains from Stourbridge Town in 2024 arrived on time, one of five stations with this record.

Preceding station	National Rail	Following station
Stourbridge Junction	West Midlands Railway; Stourbridge Town branch line	Terminus
