= West Midlands Trains (2017–2026) =

Former British train operating company

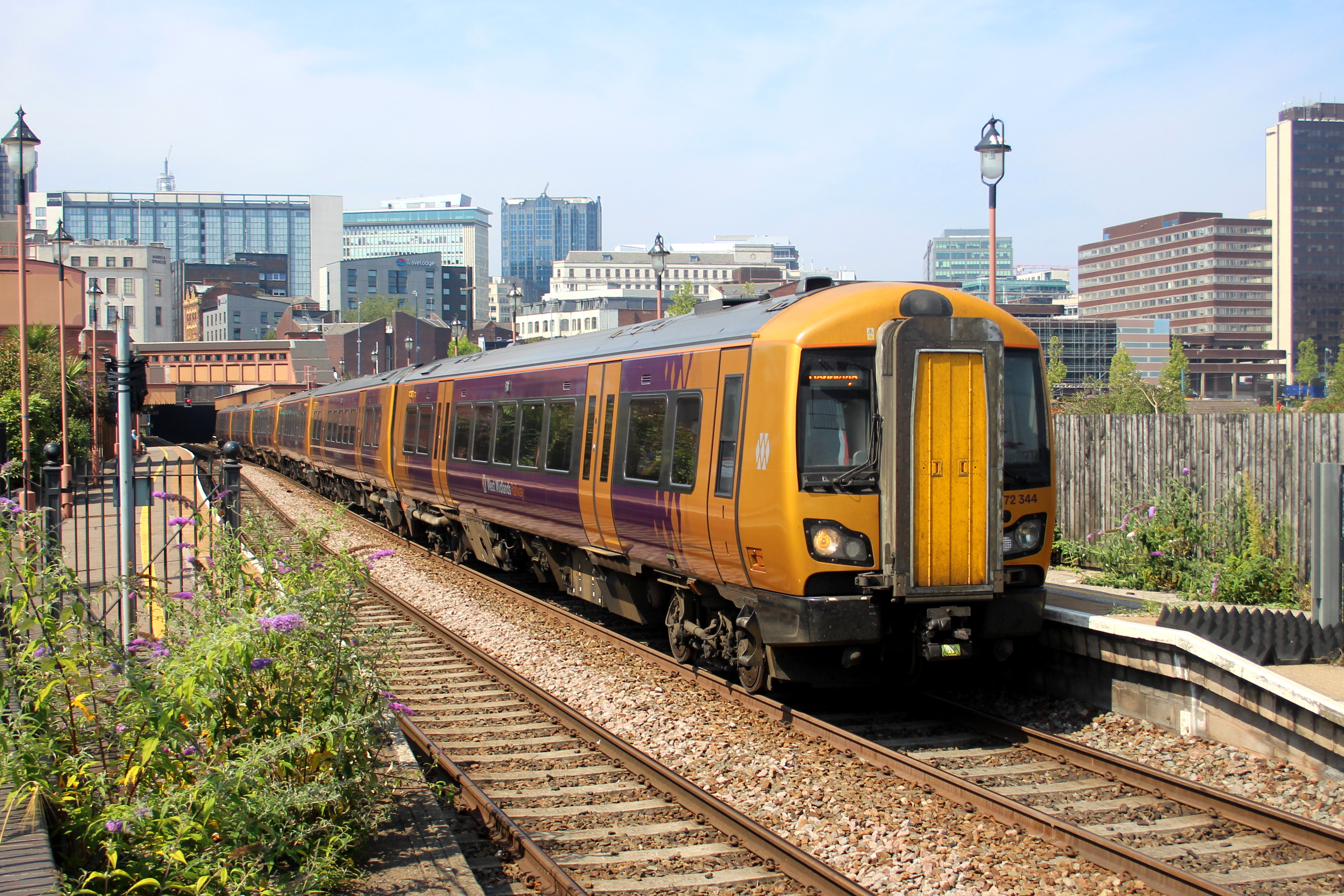
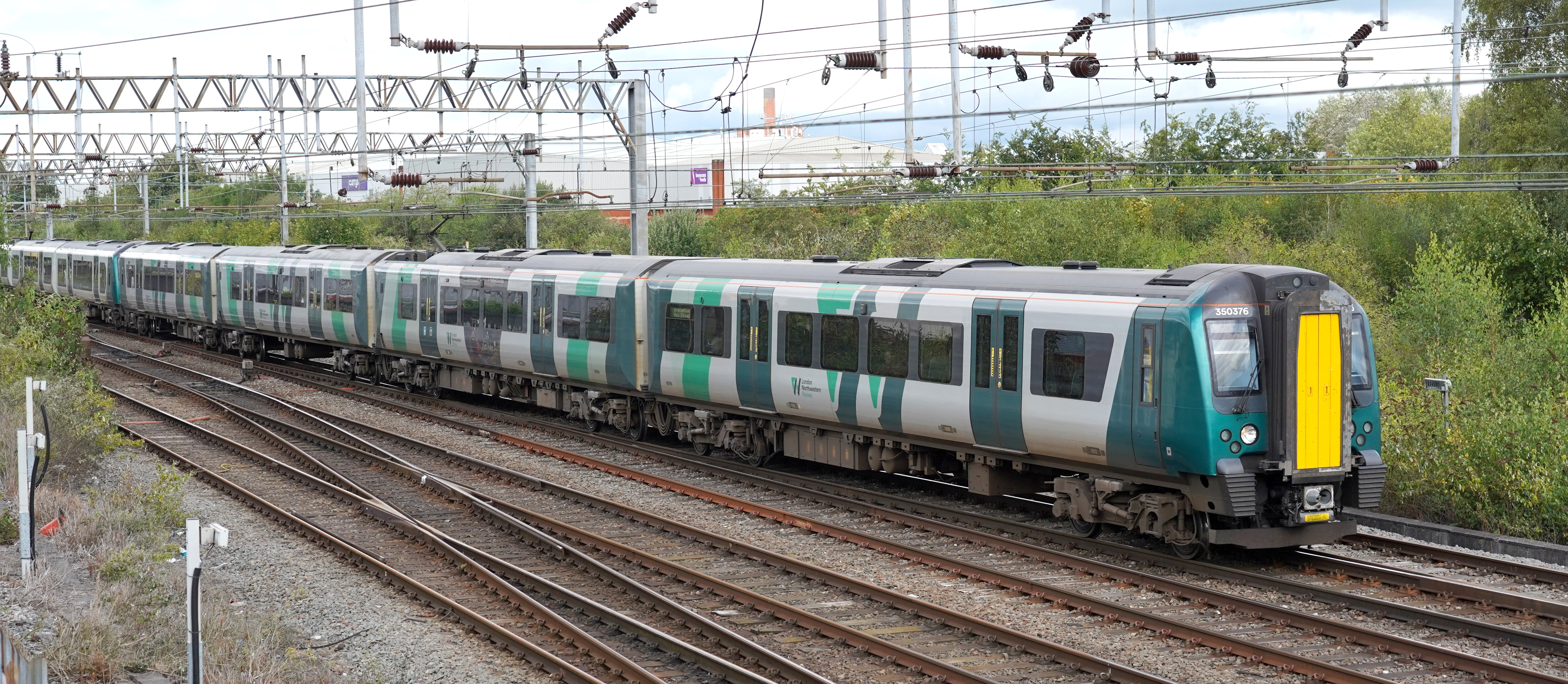
- Top/left: Class 172 in WMR livery at Birmingham Moor Street; Bottom/right: Class 350 in LNR livery near Crewe

Overview
- Franchises: West Midlands; 10 December 2017 – 1 February 2026
- Main regions: Greater London; West Midlands
- Other regions: East of England; East Midlands; North West; South East
- Fleet: West Midlands Railway: Class 139 Parry People Mover; Class 172 Turbostar; Class 196 Civity; Class 730/0 Aventra; London Northwestern Railway: Class 150 Sprinter; Class 350 Desiro; Class 730/2 Aventra
- Stations called at: 178
- Stations operated: 146
- Parent company: Transport UK Group (85%); Mitsui & Co (15%)
- Headquarters: Birmingham
- Reporting mark: LM
- Predecessor: London Midland
- Successor: West Midlands Trains

Technical
- Length: 539 mi (867 km)

Other
- Website: westmidlandsrailway.co.uk londonnorthwesternrailway.co.uk
Route map
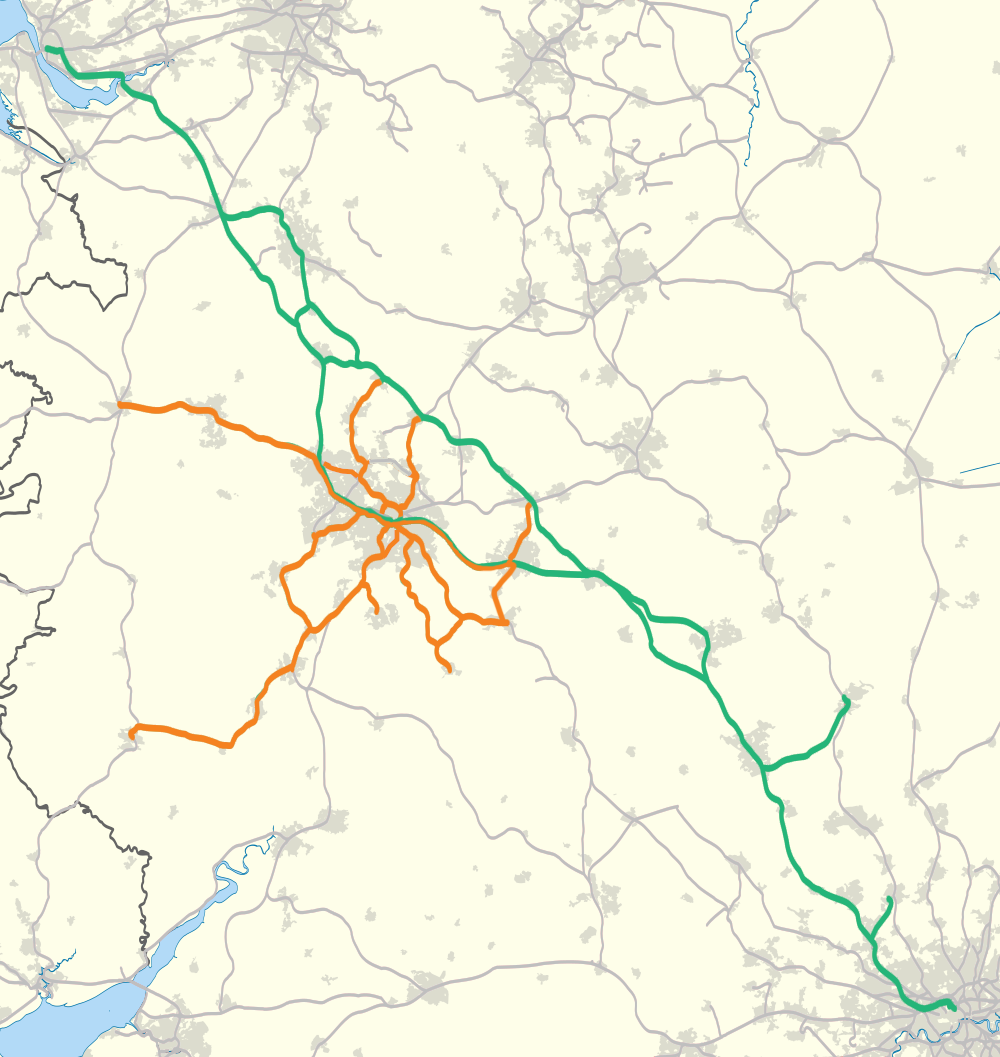
West Midlands Railway
London Northwestern Railway

West Midlands Trains Limited (WMT) was a British train operating company. It operated passenger trains on the West Midlands network and between London and Liverpool, under two trading names: as West Midlands Railway (WMR) within the West Midlands region and as London Northwestern Railway (LNR) outside the region.

West Midlands Trains was created as a consortium of three companies, Abellio, JR East, and Mitsui & Co, which joined to bid for the West Midlands franchise; they were amongst the three bids to be shortlisted in April 2016, and were awarded the franchise during August 2017. JR East sold its 15% interest to Abellio in September 2021. In 2023 Abellio sold its stake to Transport UK Group.

In addition to the DfT, it was also accountable to the West Midlands Rail Executive for services that operate wholly within the West Midlands region. On 10 December 2017, West Midlands Trains took over operations from the prior operator, London Midland.

Passenger services were transferred to state ownership under control of the DfT Operator as West Midlands Trains on 1 February 2026, when the franchise contract ended.

== History ==
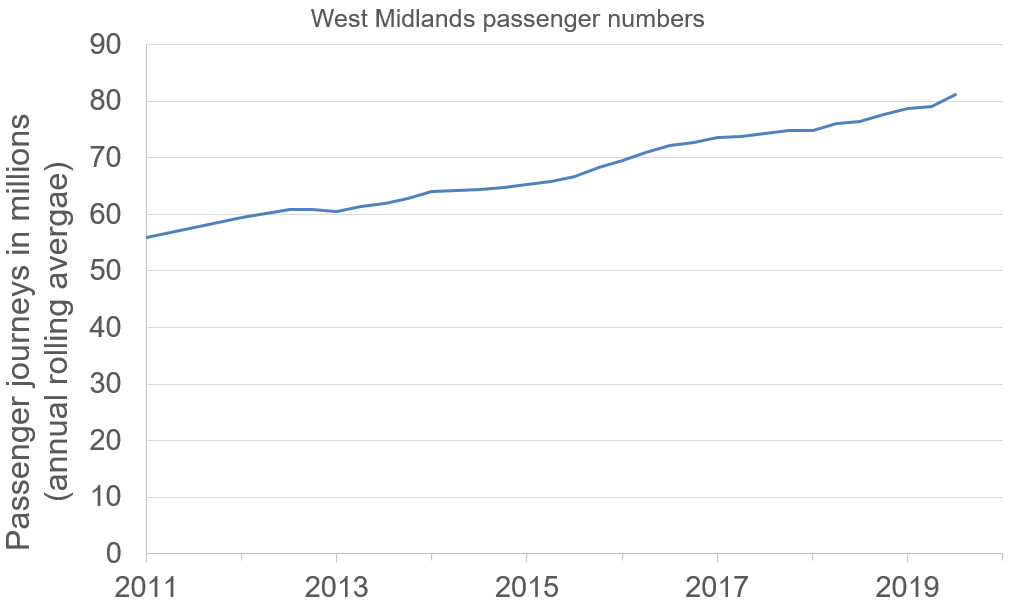
Passenger journeys on the West Midlands rail franchise from 2010–11 to 2018–19

In April 2016, the Department for Transport (DfT) announced the shortlist of bidders for the West Midlands franchise, comprising the incumbent operator Govia, MTR Corporation, and West Midlands Trains: a consortium of Abellio (70%), JR East (15%) and Mitsui & Co (15%). During July 2016, MTR Corporation abruptly opted to withdraw itself from the bidding process.

In August 2016, a formal invitation to tender for the franchise was issued to the two remaining bidders. During August 2017, the West Midlands Trains consortium was awarded the franchise; it took over operations from the prior operator, London Midland, on 10 December 2017. The contract was scheduled to run until March 2026.

Unlike the previous London Midland franchise, which was solely accountable to the DfT, for services that operate wholly within the West Midlands region, West Midlands Trains is also accountable to the West Midlands Rail Executive, a group of 16 local authorities. However, until the franchise is re-let, the DfT must still approve any changes that the West Midlands Rail Executive may wish to make.

By mid-2020, West Midlands Trains had considerably curtailed its services in response to the significant decline of passenger travel amid the COVID-19 pandemic. From 15 June 2020, both passengers and staff on public transport in England, including West Midlands Trains services, were required to wear face coverings while travelling, and anyone failing to do so were liable to be refused travel or fined.

In May 2021, the company was criticised after it sent an email to 2,500 employees apparently thanking them for their work during the COVID-19 pandemic and offering a financial bonus; however, employees who clicked on the link within the email were informed that there was, in fact, no bonus and that the email had been a "phishing simulation test”.

In September 2021, following emergency measures to deal with the financial impact of the COVID-19 pandemic, the DfT awarded WMT a direct contract until 20 September 2026, replacing its existing franchise agreement.

West Midlands Trains is one of several train operators impacted by the 2022–2024 United Kingdom railway strikes, which are the first national rail strikes in the UK for three decades. Its workers are amongst those who are participating in industrial action due to a dispute over pay and working conditions. West Midlands Trains was only capable of operating a very minimal timetable on any of the planned dates for the strikes due to the number of staff involved.

Abellio's stake in West Midlands Trains was included in the sale of its United Kingdom business to Transport UK Group in February 2023.

=== Penalty fares ===
As of 2024, West Midlands Trains operated a penalty fare policy requiring passengers to purchase a ticket before boarding. In the event that this is not possible, passengers must make themselves known to the conductor immediately on boarding.

=== Transfer to state ownership ===
In July 2025, as part of the Starmer government's programme of passenger rail services renationalisation it was announced that all passenger services will revert to state ownership under the similarly named, but DfT Operator-owned company, West Midlands Trains, on 1 February 2026.

== Branding ==
The shared West Midlands branding, here orange for rail

WMT services are split into two businesses which operate under two distinct sub-brands. Train services running on the West Coast Main Line, including those running to/from London Euston, Liverpool Lime Street and Crewe, operate under the London Northwestern Railway brand. This name was chosen in tribute to the former London & North Western Railway (LNWR), the company that operated services on the route between 1846 and 1922. Branding of trains and associated publicity use a green colour scheme with a logo composed of the letters L, N and W.

Services running in Birmingham and the West Midlands region – previously operated by London Midland under the London Midland City brand – are operated by WMT under the West Midlands Railway brand. WMT have chosen to operate these services as a distinct business unit in order to facilitate a possible future devolution of these services from the national DfT to the West Midlands Combined Authority. These services bear an orange and purple colour scheme and are branded with a hexagonal "WM" monogram adopted as part of a shared branding initiative under Transport for West Midlands, in which several transport modes in the West Midlands County use similar branding to emphasise integrated transport. Each mode bears a variant of the "WM" logo: West Midlands Buses use a red logo, West Midlands Metro trams use a blue logo, cycling initiatives are branded with a green logo, West Midlands Railway bears an orange logo, and the West Midlands Rail Executive uses a turquoise logo.

== London Northwestern Railway services ==
WMT's services along the West Coast Main Line rail corridor are operated under the London Northwestern Railway brand. These services include:

- services out of London Euston;
- branch line services off the south of the West Coast main line.

As of December 2025, the typical off-peak Monday - Saturday London Northwestern Railway service pattern, with frequencies in trains per hour (tph), includes:

West Coast Main Line
Route	tph	Calling at
London Euston – Tring	2	Harrow & Wealdstone; Watford Junction; Hemel Hempstead; Berkhamsted
London Euston – Milton Keynes Central	2	Harrow & Wealdstone; Bushey; Watford Junction; Kings Langley; Apsley; Hemel Hempstead; Berkhamsted; Tring; Cheddington, Leighton Buzzard; Bletchley
London Euston – Birmingham New Street	2	Watford Junction (1tph); Leighton Buzzard; Bletchley; Milton Keynes Central; Wolverton; Northampton; Long Buckby; Rugby; Coventry; Canley; Tile Hill; Berkswell; Hampton-in-Arden; Birmingham International
London Euston – Crewe	1	Milton Keynes Central; Rugby; Nuneaton; Atherstone; Tamworth; Lichfield Trent Valley; Rugeley Trent Valley; Stafford
Stafford – Crewe	1	Stone; Stoke-on-Trent; Longport; Kidsgrove; Alsager
Birmingham New Street – Liverpool Lime Street	1	Smethwick Galton Bridge; Wolverhampton; Penkridge; Stafford; Crewe; Winsford; Hartford; Acton Bridge; Runcorn; Liverpool South Parkway
Birmingham New Street – Liverpool Lime Street	1	Coseley; Wolverhampton; Penkridge; Stafford; Crewe; Runcorn; Liverpool South Parkway; Mossley Hill
Abbey Line
Route	tph	Calling at
Watford Junction – St Albans Abbey	1	Watford North; Garston; Bricket Wood; How Wood; Park Street
Marston Vale Line
Route	tph	Calling at
Bletchley – Bedford	1	Fenny Stratford; Bow Brickhill; Woburn Sands; Aspley Guise; Ridgmont; Lidlington; Millbrook; Stewartby; Kempston Hardwick; Bedford St Johns

== West Midlands Railway services ==
In the West Midlands region, WMT's train services are operated under the West Midlands Railway brand. These services include:

- services through Birmingham;
- the Coventry to Leamington and Coventry to Nuneaton branch lines.

Services on the short Stourbridge Town branch line are run by the open access operator Pre Metro Operations, who operate services on behalf of WMT under the West Midlands Railway brand name.

As of December 2025, the typical off-peak Monday–Saturday West Midlands Railway service pattern, with frequencies in trains per hour (tph), includes:

Birmingham – Shrewsbury
Route	tph	Calling at
Birmingham New Street – Shrewsbury	1	Smethwick Galton Bridge; Wolverhampton; Shifnal; Telford Central; Wellington
Birmingham New Street – Shrewsbury	1	Tame Bridge Parkway; Wolverhampton; Bilbrook; Codsall; Albrighton; Cosford; Shifnal; Telford Central; Oakengates; Wellington
Malvern Line
Route	tph	Calling at
Birmingham New Street – Hereford	1	University; Bromsgrove; Droitwich Spa; Worcester Foregate Street; Malvern Link; Great Malvern; Colwall; Ledbury
Cross-City Line
Route	tph	Calling at
Lichfield Trent Valley – Bromsgrove	2	Lichfield City; Shenstone; Blake Street; Butlers Lane; Four Oaks; Sutton Coldfield; Wylde Green; Chester Road; Erdington; Gravelly Hill, Aston; Duddeston; Birmingham New Street; Five Ways; University; Selly Oak; Bournville; Kings Norton; Northfield; Longbridge; Barnt Green (1tph)
Four Oaks – Redditch	2	Sutton Coldfield; Wylde Green; Chester Road; Erdington; Gravelly Hill; Aston; Birmingham New Street; Five Ways; University; Selly Oak; Bournville; Kings Norton; Northfield; Longbridge; Barnt Green; Alvechurch
Chase Line
Route	tph	Calling at
Wolverhampton – Walsall	2	Coseley; Tipton; Dudley Port; Sandwell & Dudley; Smethwick Galton Bridge; Smethwick Rolfe Street; Birmingham New Street; Duddeston; Aston; Witton; Perry Barr; Hamstead; Tame Bridge Parkway; Bescot Stadium
Birmingham International – Rugeley Trent Valley	2	Marston Green; Lea Hall; Stechford; Adderley Park (1tph); Birmingham New Street; Tame Bridge Parkway; Walsall; Bloxwich; Bloxwich North; Landywood; Cannock; Hednesford; Rugeley Town
Snow Hill lines
Route	tph	Calling at
Stratford-upon-Avon – Worcester Foregate Street via Dorridge	1	Stratford-upon-Avon Parkway; Lapworth; Dorridge; Widney Manor; Solihull; Olton; Acocks Green; Small Heath; Birmingham Moor Street; Birmingham Snow Hill; Jewellery Quarter; The Hawthorns; Smethwick Galton Bridge; Rowley Regis, Cradley Heath; Stourbridge Junction; Hagley; Blakedown; Kidderminster, Droitwich Spa; Worcester Shrub Hill
Stratford-upon-Avon – Kidderminster via Whitlocks End	1	Stratford-upon-Avon Parkway; Wilmcote, Wootton Wawen; Henley-in-Arden; Danzey; Wood End; The Lakes; Earlswood; Wythall; Whitlocks End; Shirley; Yardley Wood; Hall Green; Spring Road; Tyseley; Small Heath; Birmingham Moor Street; Birmingham Snow Hill; Jewellery Quarter; The Hawthorns; Smethwick Galton Bridge; Langley Green; Rowley Regis; Old Hill; Cradley Heath; Lye; Stourbridge Junction
Whitlocks End – Kidderminster	1	Shirley; Yardley Wood; Hall Green; Spring Road; Tyseley; Small Heath; Birmingham Moor Street, Birmingham Snow Hill; Jewellery Quarter; The Hawthorns; Smethwick Galton Bridge; Langley Green; Rowley Regis; Old Hill; Cradley Heath; Lye; Stourbridge Junction
Dorridge – Worcester Foregate Street	1	Widney Manor; Solihull; Olton; Acocks Green; Tyseley; Birmingham Moor Street; Birmingham Snow Hill; Jewellery Quarter; The Hawthorns; Smethwick Galton Bridge; Rowley Regis; Cradley Heath; Stourbridge Junction; Hagley; Blakedown; Kidderminster; Hartlebury, Droitwich Spa
Branch lines
Route	tph	Calling at
Stourbridge Junction – Stourbridge Town	6	Shuttle service
Leamington Spa – Nuneaton	1	Kenilworth; Coventry; Coventry Arena; Bedworth; Bermuda Park

Sunday services are generally hourly on most routes however:

- On the Malvern Line, services between Birmingham New Street and Hereford are reduced to a two-hourly service.
- Two trains per hour run on the Cross-City line between Lichfield Trent Valley and Redditch with both trains calling at Duddeston. An hourly service operates between Birmingham New Street and Bromsgrove.
- Services at local stations between Birmingham New Street and Birmingham International are provided by additional calls on London Northwestern Railway services between Birmingham New Street and Northampton/London Euston.
- On the Snow Hill lines, services operate hourly from Stratford-upon-Avon to Worcester Foregate Street via Shirley and do not call at Wood End, Danzey, Small Heath, Langley Green, Old Hill or Lye but calls at Tyseley in both directions. An hourly service also operates between Dorridge and Stourbridge Junction in the daytime which picks up the calls at Langley Green, Old Hill and Lye and runs non-stop between Birmingham Moor Street and Acocks Green.
- Services between Stourbridge Junction and Stourbridge Town are reduced to 4 trains per hour.

=== Planned changes ===
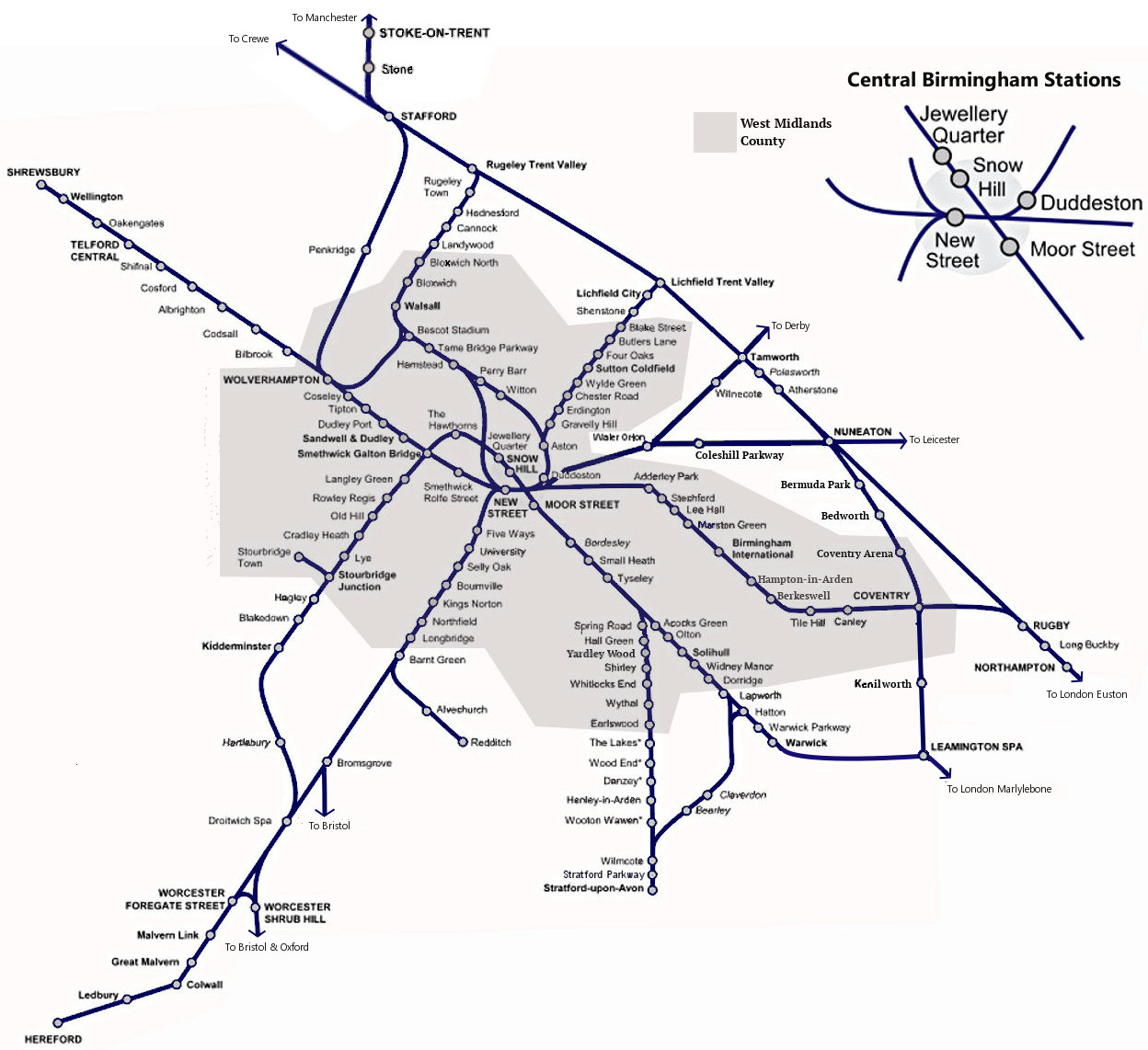
Map of the Birmingham & West Midlands rail network (2017)

Planned changes include:

- Reopening of 3 stations on the Camp Hill line and reintroduction of a service (2 tph) from Kings Norton to Birmingham New Street. Platform allocation will be taken from the Cross-City Line. Originally intended to open in 2023, all three stations opened in April 2026.

== Rolling stock ==
WMT inherited a fleet of Class 139, 150, 153, 170, 172, Class 319, 323 and 350 units from London Midland, but as the newer units entered service, some were returned to the leasing companies that own them.

=== Fleet details ===
==== Class 139 Parry People Movers ====
The concept of using the lightweight railcar dates from 2006 when a year-long pilot scheme began on the Stourbridge Town branch line on Sundays, using a Parry People Movers PPM50 unit constructed in 2002 and numbered as 999900 under TOPS. The success of this trial led to the provision of regular services using the technology in the franchise plans for the new West Midlands Franchise. Following the award of the franchise to London Midland, it placed an order for two PPM60 units with Parry People Movers, through Porterbrook. The service itself was operated for London Midland by Pre Metro Operations.

These two units are 139 001 and 139 002, composed of vehicle numbers 39001 and 39002 in the British carriage and wagon numbering and classification system. The vehicles are mechanically similar to 999 900, but are approximately one metre longer. They were intended to start operating on the Stourbridge Town branch in 2008. In January 2009 it was confirmed that 139001 was still undergoing testing at Chasewater Railway and 139002 was still not completed.

Despite the difficulties in the commissioning of the two Class 139 units, London Midland consistently outlined its faith that they would be ready to enter service. In March 2009, it was announced that the first unit had received its passenger certification from Network Rail, allowing it to carry passengers. London Midland stated that they would begin a phased entry into service, starting with weekend operation in April, leading up to a full service by the timetable change in May 2009. Until then, London Midland temporarily returned a Class 153 to operating the branch service. 139 002 officially entered service on 29 March 2009 as part of the type's phased entry. This unit had previously worked in full service, including all-day on Monday 11 May 2009 and previously had worked all morning services during February and March 2009. In May 2009, the first unit, 139 001 was finally delivered to Stourbridge, with 999 900 removed at the same time. Test unit 999 900 had been on the branch line between 2005 and 2009. At the point of introduction, they displaced a single Class 153 DMU that was previously allocated to the branch line. By December 2009, the 200,000th passenger had been carried by the railcars.

==== Class 150 Sprinter ====
In July 2023, three Class 150/1s, 150137, 150139 and 150141, were transferred from Northern Trains to London Northwestern Railway for use on the Marston Vale line, after the Class 230s in use on the line were withdrawn from use in December 2022 due to maintenance concerns after the company who maintained the units, Vivarail, went into administration. The Class 150s entered service with LNR on 20 November 2023.

==== Class 172 Turbostar ====
West Midlands Trains operate a total of 39 two-car and three-car Class 172 units, 27 of which had been ordered by predecessor London Midland, who originally planned for them to enter service by the end of 2010 on services to and from Birmingham Snow Hill, replacing Class 150s. The original 27 sets have revised front ends with end gangways which make the trains look like the Electrostar family of units.

From 1 September 2011, the Class 172s started operating on the Snow Hill Lines with some weekend work from Birmingham – Hereford. When first used in service, the units suffered a fault with engine vibration in the passenger cabin, which has since been rectified.

The units were originally meant to replace all of the Class 150s, however three were retained until 2019 and moved on to Northern after the Class 172/0 and Class 230 units entered service. Between late 2018 and early 2019 West Midlands Railway inherited the London Overground 172/0s to replace the remaining Class 150s and Class 153s operating on the Coventry to Leamington line, the Coventry to Nuneaton line and Birmingham to Hereford. All had entered service by May 2019.

In May 2021, Chiltern Railways' fleet of four Class 172/1s transferred to West Midlands Trains. This transfer means that all of the Class 172 units are operated by West Midlands Trains. The initial sublease contract was until December 2021, the end of Chiltern Railways' franchise agreement, but the units have remained with West Midlands Trains, with Chiltern stating that the 172/1s would not be returning to them.

==== Class 196 Civity ====
WMT has replaced its fleet of 23 Class 170/5 and 170/6 Turbostar and eight Class 153 units, which operate on West Midlands Railway services, with 26 new Class 196 Civity units.

The Class 153 units left West Midlands Trains at the end of 2020, and the Class 170 units moved to East Midlands Railway, with the exception of the centre cars of the 170/6s which moved to CrossCountry to lengthen its 170/5s.

The first of these new units entered service on the Shrewsbury line on 17 October 2022.

==== Class 350 Desiro ====
All of London Midland's 77 Class 350s were inherited by West Midlands Trains on 9 December 2017. A further 10 were transferred from TransPennine Express in 2019–20.

The fleet is based at the purpose-built Kings Heath depot at Kingsthorpe, which opened in June 2006. In May 2021, they took over services on the Abbey line from Class 319s.

All Class 350/2 units will be replaced by brand new Class 730 units. The first Class 350/2s were sent off lease in October 2024.

=== Fleet at end of franchise ===
Family	Class	Image	Type	Top speed		Number	Carriages	Routes operated	Built
Family	Class	Image	Type	mph	km/h	Number	Carriages	Routes operated	Built
Shunting locomotive
	08		Shunter	15	24	2	N/A	Stock movements	1952–1962
West Midlands Railway
Parry People Mover	139		Railcar	20	32	2	1	Stourbridge Town branch line	2009
Bombardier Turbostar	172		DMU	100	161	8	2	Birmingham–Hereford; Snow Hill lines; Leamington Spa to Nuneaton	2010
Bombardier Turbostar	172		DMU	100	161	4	2	Birmingham–Hereford; Snow Hill lines; Leamington Spa to Nuneaton	2011
Bombardier Turbostar	172		DMU	100	161	12	2	Birmingham–Hereford; Snow Hill lines; Leamington Spa to Nuneaton	2011
Bombardier Turbostar	172		DMU	100	161	15	3	Birmingham–Hereford; Snow Hill lines; Leamington Spa to Nuneaton	2011
CAF Civity	196		DMU	100	161	12	2	Snow Hill lines; Birmingham–Shrewsbury; Birmingham–Hereford; Leamington Spa to Nuneaton	2019–20
CAF Civity	196		DMU	100	161	14	4	Snow Hill lines; Birmingham–Shrewsbury; Birmingham–Hereford; Leamington Spa to Nuneaton	2019–20
Bombardier Aventra	Class 730/0 Landmark		EMU	90	145	48 (40 in service)	3	West Midlands Railway: Wolverhampton – Walsall via Birmingham New Street; Cross-City Line; Chase Line	2021–2023
London Northwestern Railway
Sprinter	150		DMU	75	121	3	2	Marston Vale line	1985–1986
Siemens Desiro	350		EMU	110	177	50	4	London Northwestern Railway: Abbey Line; Birmingham New Street–Northampton; Stafford–Crewe; London Euston–Tring/Milton Keynes Central; London Euston–Northampton; London Euston–Crewe via Trent Valley Line; London Euston–Birmingham New Street; Birmingham New Street–Liverpool Lime Street; West Midlands Railway: Chase Line	2004–2014
Bombardier Aventra	Class 730/0 Landmark		EMU	90	145	48 (40 in service)	3	London Northwestern Railway: London Euston – Tring/Milton Keynes Central; London Euston – Northampton	2021–2023
Bombardier Aventra	Class 730/2		EMU	110	177	36	5	LNR suburban services Long distance LNR services	2021–2024

=== Future fleet ===
In October 2017, details were announced of planned new rolling stock for West Midlands Trains. Specifically, West Midlands Trains placed orders for 26 new CAF Civity diesel multiple units (80 carriages) as well as 81 electric multiple units based on Bombardier Transportation's Aventra platform (333 carriages). When combined, this totals 107 new trains that will be operated by the company. The latter order was later amended to 84 units totalling 324 carriages.

==== Class 730 Aventra ====
81 units, comprising 36 three car and 45 five car trains, were ordered in 2017. This was later amended to 48 three car trains and 36 five car trains, totalling 84 units. They will be built at Derby Litchurch Lane Works.

=== Past fleet ===
==== Class 153 "Super Sprinter" ====
West Midlands Trains used eight Class 153 DMUs on commuter lines in the West Midlands including the Leamington Spa to Nuneaton line and the Marston Vale line between Bedford and Bletchley. After Class 172 from London Overground and Class 230s' deployment on those two lines, they were used with Class 170s and Class 172s on Birmingham-Hereford and Snow Hill Lines.

==== Class 170 Turbostar ====
West Midlands Trains operated twenty-three Class 170 Turbostars, which they had inherited from their predecessor London Midland in 2017, on services on the Birmingham to Hereford via Bromsgrove Line, and Birmingham - Shrewsbury via Telford Central services.

WMT replaced all of its 170s with 26 new Class 196 Civity units from late 2022. However, these 170s had already started moving to East Midlands Railway (EMR) in 2021, with the first moving in February 2021. The final four ex-WMT 170s joined EMR in May 2023.

For the vast majority of the duration that these 23 170s were operated on the West Midlands franchise, they were formed as 17 two-car 170/5s and six three-car 170/6s. However, in 2021, before they had all transferred to EMR, the centre cars of what were WMT's six Class 170/6s moved to CrossCountry, to enable it to strengthen some of its previously two-car units, meaning that EMR received the ex-WMT 170s as 23 two-car 170/5s, as they only leased the driving cars (with CrossCountry's lengthened units changing subclass from 170/5 to 170/6).

==== Class 230 D-Train ====
West Midlands Trains were the first operator of the Class 230, a new class of diesel-electric multiple unit that were upcycled London Underground D78 Stock.

The company announced its plans to procure three two-car D-Train units for use on the Marston Vale line during October 2017. In April 2019, four months later than intended, the first Class 230 entered regular service.

In December 2022, the units were withdrawn after Vivarail, the units' manufacturer and maintainer, entered administration.

==== Class 319 ====
West Midlands Trains operated 7 Class 319 units, inherited from London Midland, on the Watford Junction to St Albans Abbey service and some peak West Coast Main Line services out of London Euston.

A week after the start of the new franchise, West Midlands Trains leased additional Class 319 units, which had previously operated with Thameslink. These extra units enabled the company to take their Class 350/1 and 350/3 Desiro units out of service for their planned refurbishment.

All of the Class 319 units operated by London Northwestern Railway were withdrawn on 27 November 2023 after being replaced by Class 730 units.

==== Class 323 ====
West Midlands Trains operated 26 Class 323 units on the Birmingham Cross-City Line.

A farewell tour was held on 29 September 2024 to mark the withdrawal from service of the West Midlands fleet. The West Midlands fleet was withdrawn from service the same day.

The West Midlands Class 323 fleet was replaced by the Class 730.

=== Class 350/2 ===
The Class 350/2 fleet was withdrawn from service in late 2025.

Family	Class	Image	Type	Number	Carriages	Built	Routes operated	Withdrawn
Sprinter	150/1		DMU	3	2	1985–86	London Northwestern Railway: Marston Vale Line; West Midlands Railway: Birmingham–Hereford	2019
Sprinter	153		DMU	8	1	1987–88	West Midlands Railway: Birmingham–Hereford; Snow Hill Lines	2020
Bombardier Turbostar	170		DMU	17	2	1999–2000	West Midlands Railway: Birmingham–Hereford; Birmingham–Shrewsbury; Snow Hill Lines; Shrewsbury-Walsall via Birmingham New Street; Chase Line	2021–2023
Bombardier Turbostar	170		DMU	6	3	1999–2000	West Midlands Railway: Birmingham–Hereford; Birmingham–Shrewsbury; Snow Hill Lines; Shrewsbury-Walsall via Birmingham New Street; Chase Line	2021–2023
Vivarail D-Train	230		DEMU	3	2	2016–2018 (Note: Converted from London Underground D78 Stock originally built between 1979 and 1983.)	London Northwestern Railway: Bedford-Bletchley	1 December 2022
BR Second Generation (Mark 3)	319		EMU	15	4	1987–1988	London Northwestern Railway: London Euston–Tring/Milton Keynes Central; London Euston–Northampton	2022-2023
Hunslet Transportation Projects/Holec	323		EMU	26	3	1992-1995	West Midlands Railway: Birmingham to Worcester via Bromsgrove line (Note: Between Birmingham and Bromsgrove.); Cross-City Line	2023-2024
Siemens Desiro	350		EMU	37	4	2008-2009	London Northwestern Railway: Abbey Line; Birmingham New Street–Northampton; Stafford–Crewe; London Euston–Tring/Milton Keynes Central; London Euston–Northampton; London Euston–Crewe via Trent Valley Line; London Euston–Birmingham New Street; Birmingham New Street–Liverpool Lime Street	2024–2025

Preceded by London Midland	Operator of West Midlands franchise 2017–2026	Succeeded by West Midlands Trains
