= West Midlands Railway (disambiguation) =

West Midlands Railway may refer to:

- West Midland Railway, a defunct railway company which operated in England 1860–1863
- West Midlands Rail Executive, partnership of transport authorities in England involved in the operation of rail transport
- West Midlands Trains, an English train operating company nationalised in 2026, operating as West Midlands Railway and London Northwestern Railway
  - West Midlands Trains (2017–2026), a former train operating company operated by Transport UK Group and Mitsui & Co.

== See also ==
- List of railway stations in the West Midlands
