= Danzey =

Danzey may refer to:

- Danzey Green, a small hamlet in Warwickshire, England
- Danzey railway station, a railway station in Warwickshire, England

== People with the surname ==
- Jack Danzey (1941–2020), Australian rugby league player, referee and administrator
- Michael Danzey (born 1971), English footballer
