= West Midlands Franchise =

West Midlands Franchise may refer to:

- West Midlands Franchise, operated by London Midland between 2007 and 2017
- West Midlands Franchise, operated by West Midlands Trains since December 2017
