= Henley railway station =

Henley railway station may refer to:

- Henley-in-Arden railway station, a railway station serving the town of Henley-in-Arden, Warwickshire, England
- Henley-on-Thames railway station, a railway station serving the town of Henley-on-Thames, Oxfordshire, England
- a never built station that formed part of the 2008 proposal for the Sydney Metro in New South Wales, Australia
