= Fort Parkway railway station =

Prospective railway station in England

Coordinates: 52.5101°N 1.8036°W

Fort Parkway
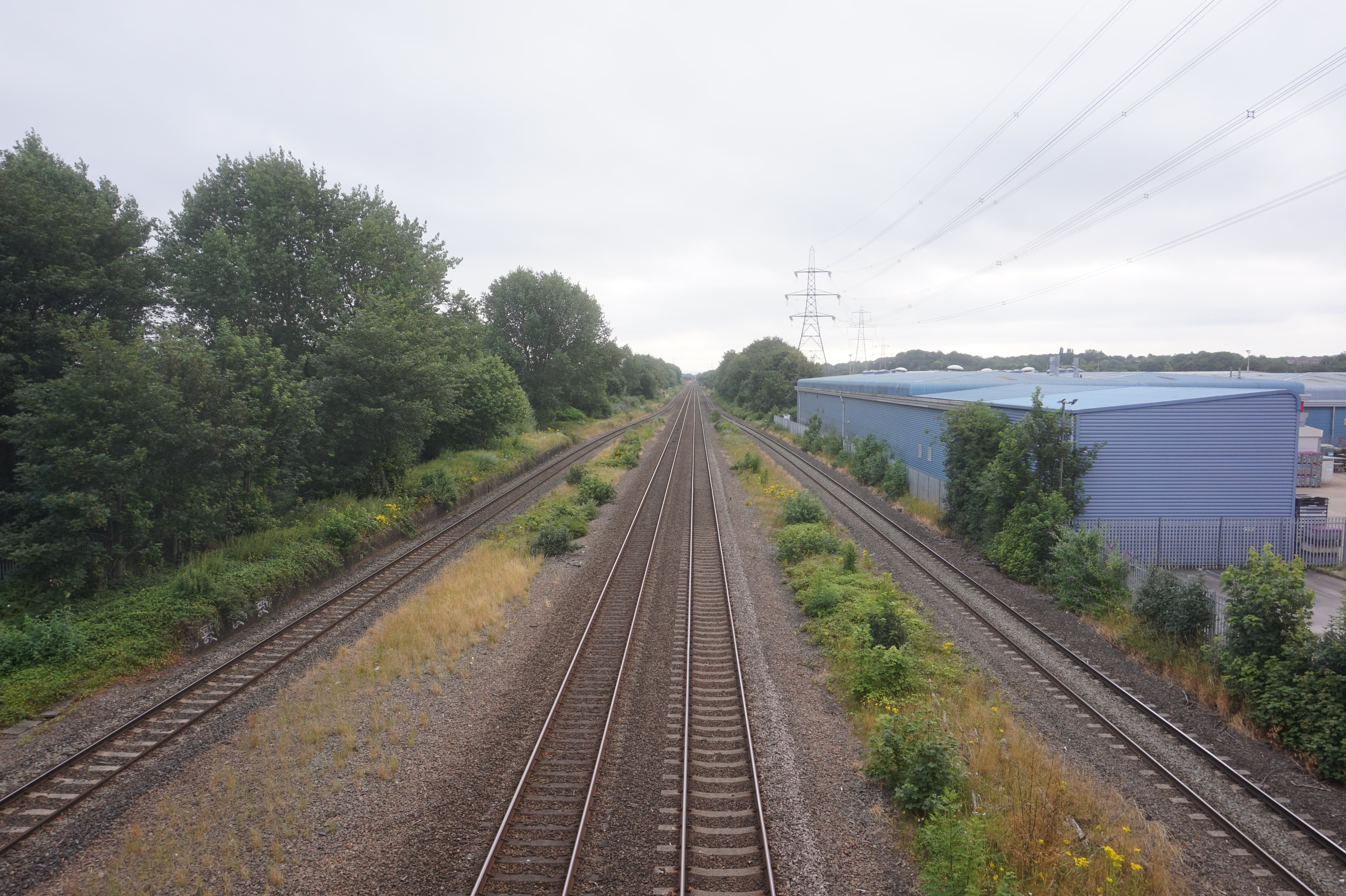
- The proposed site of the station

General information
- Location: Bromford, Birmingham; England
- Grid reference: SP133902
- Platforms: 2
Location

Fort Parkway is a proposed new parkway railway station to the east of Birmingham, England. It is still in the planning stage, and the West Midlands Rail Executive plans for it to be open by 2050.

== History ==
The station was a candidate for funding in the Restoring Your Railway programme as of 2020; the program was cancelled in July 2024. In September 2023, the West Midlands Rail Executive planned for the station to be open by 2050. It was also noted by Birmingham City Council that capacity increases from the reintroduction of the Bordesley Chords would free up enough capacity on the Birmingham–Peterborough line to facilitate the station's reopening.

== Location ==
The station is located on the Birmingham–Peterborough line, nearby to the old Bromford Bridge station, and would give the east of Birmingham local commuter trains easing congestion on the roads into the city. The close proximity to the motorways would draw in longer distance passengers who wish to commute into the West Midlands conurbation. It would also provide new railway access to the Fort Shopping Centre, Fort Dunlop, Bromford, Birches Green and Ward End.

The station has been called Fort Parkway instead of Bromford Bridge after the nearby A47, called Fort Parkway. All but one station (Water Orton) has been axed between Tamworth and Birmingham, leaving locals isolated, with no rail link. The station would serve these communities in addition to passengers drawn from the motorway network. It would provide Park and Ride facilities, with a large car park. It is planned to have two platforms on the existing multiple tracked line.
