= British Rail Class 172 =

British diesel multiple-unit class, built by Bombardier Transportation

British Rail Class 172 Turbostar
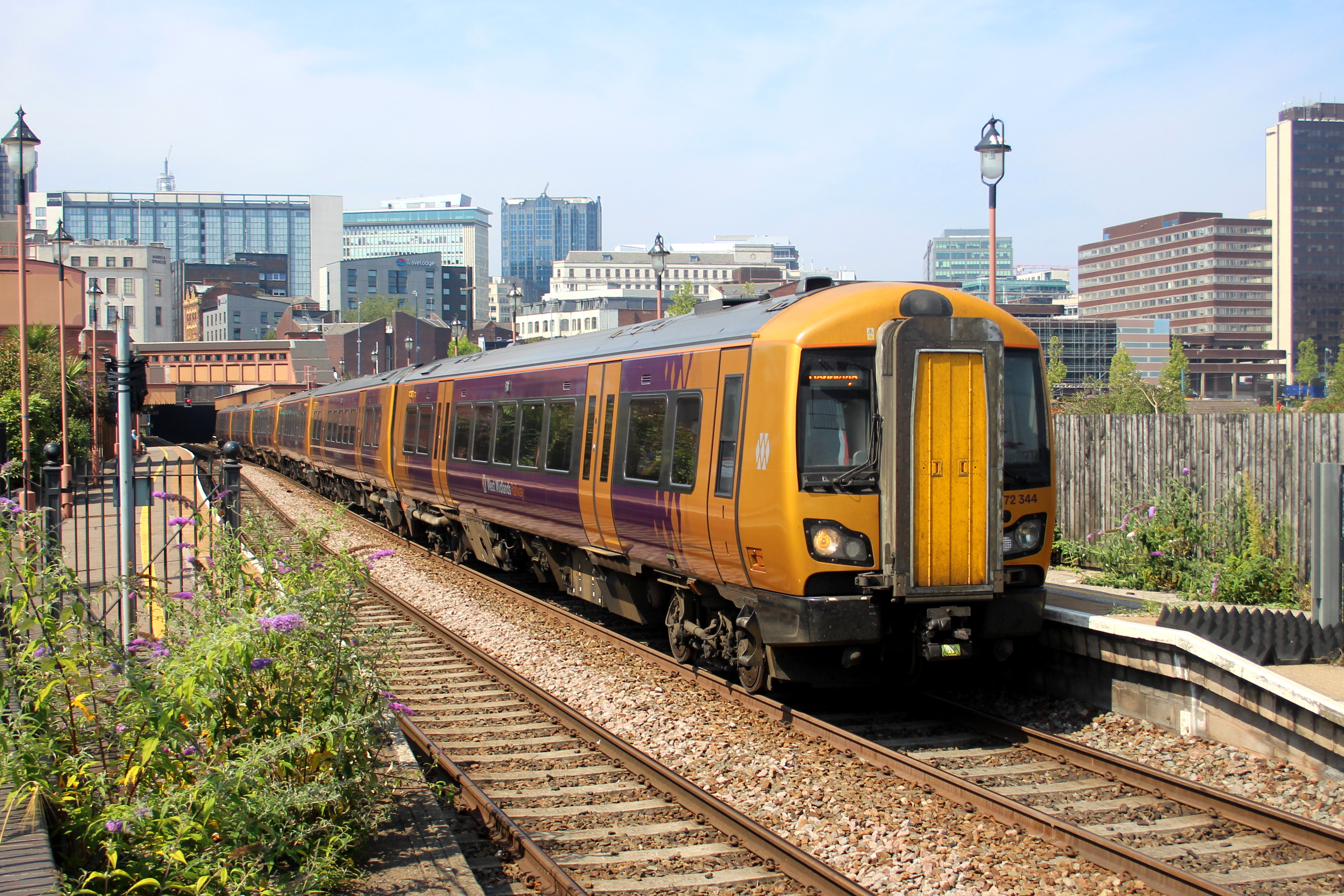
- West Midlands Trains Class 172/3s at Birmingham Moor Street

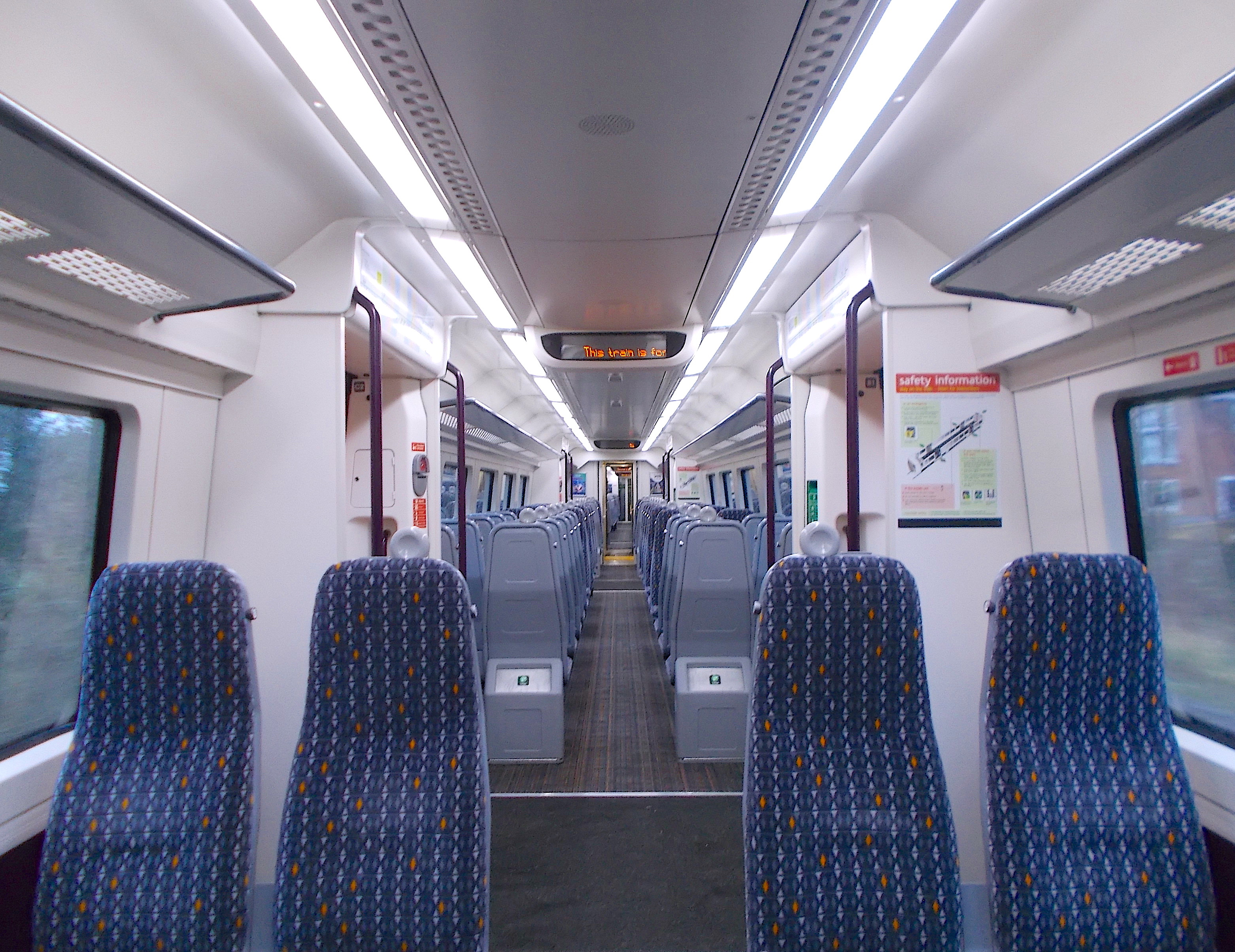
- West Midlands Railway Class 172 saloon
- In service: 10 July 2010 – present
- Manufacturer: Bombardier Transportation
- Built at: Derby Litchurch Lane Works
- Family name: Turbostar
- Replaced: Class 150; Class 153
- Constructed: 2010–2011
- Number built: 39
- Successor: Class 196 (West Midlands Trains); Class 378 (London Overground)
- Formation: 2 cars per 172/0, /1, /2 unit: DMOS-DMOSLW; 3 cars per 172/3 unit: DMOS-MOS-DMOSLW
- Fleet numbers: 172/0: 172001–172008; 172/1: 172101–172104; 172/2: 172211–172222; 172/3: 172331–172345
- Capacity: 172/0: 124 seats; 172/1: 140 seats + 5 tip-up; 172/2: 120 seats + 19 tip-up; 172/3: 192 seats + 27 tip-up
- Owners: Angel Trains (172/0 and /1); Porterbrook (172/2 and /3)
- Operator: West Midlands Trains
- Depot: Tyseley
- Lines served: Snow Hill Lines; Coventry–Leamington Line; Coventry–Nuneaton Line

Specifications
- Car body construction: Welded aluminium with steel ends
- Car length: DM. vehs.: 23.62 m (77 ft 6 in); MOS vehs.: 23.00 m (75 ft 6 in)
- Width: 2.69 m (8 ft 10 in)
- Height: 3.77 m (12 ft 4 in)
- Doors: Double-leaf sliding plug (2 per side per car)
- Maximum speed: 100 mph (160 km/h)
- Weight: (see § Vehicle weights)
- Axle load: Route Availability 1
- Prime movers: 2 or 3 × MTU 6H 1800 R83 (one per car)
- Engine type: Inline-6 four-stroke turbo-diesel
- Displacement: 12.8 L (782 cu in) per engine
- Power output: 360 kW (480 hp) per engine
- Transmission: ZF 5HP 902 R (5-speed mechanical)
- UIC classification: 2-car: 2′B′+B′2′; 3-car: 2′B′+2′B′+B′2′
- Bogies: Bombardier B5006
- Braking systems: Electro-pneumatic (disc) (Westinghouse 3-step)
- Safety systems: AWS; BR ATP (172/1 only); TPWS
- Coupling system: BSI
- Multiple working: Within class, and with Classes 14x, 15x, and 170
- Track gauge: 1,435 mm (4 ft 8 1/2 in) standard gauge

The British Rail Class 172 is a British diesel multiple unit (DMU) passenger train from the Turbostar family, built by Bombardier Transportation's Derby Litchurch Lane Works for use on inner-suburban passenger services. The entire class is currently operated by West Midlands Trains.

The Class 172 is part of the Turbostar range, similar to the Class 168, Class 170 and Class 171.

== Technical details and variants ==
There are four sub-classes, all with West Midlands Trains for use on the Snow Hill Lines and Leamington Spa - Nuneaton:

- Class 172/0 - two-car, non-gangway train sets; originally with London Overground
- Class 172/1 - two-car, non-gangway train sets; originally with Chiltern Railways
- Class 172/2 - two-car, gangway train sets
- Class 172/3 - three-car, gangway train sets.

The 172/0s and 172/1s resemble the existing Turbostar trains in not having end gangways. These trains have a maximum speed of 100 mph (160 km/h).

The Class 172/2s and 172/3s used by West Midlands Trains resemble the Class 375, Class 377, Class 379 and Class 387 Electrostars by having end gangways to allow access between units. These also resemble the Class 378 by having more of a 'Capitalstar' style front design rather than the typical 'Electrostar' front design. These trains have a maximum speed of 100 mph (160 km/h).

The 172/0s were built without any onboard toilets, in common with other London Overground stock. Toilets were retrofitted when transferred to WMT.

The Class 172s feature BSI (Bergische Stahl Industrie - Autocoupler) couplers which allow them to work in multiple with Class 168, Class 170 units and most other units with the same coupler.

=== Differences from other Turbostars ===
The Class 172 trains are lighter than other Turbostars, due to use of the Bombardier FLEXX-ECO bogies - a development of the B5000 bogies used on the Class 220 Voyager DEMU trains, rather than the previous 'Series 3' bogies. Another difference is that they have half-height airdams as opposed to the more standard full height airdams. They also differ from earlier Turbostars in having mechanical transmission rather than hydraulic - gear changes can be distinctly heard as the trains accelerate and decelerate.

=== Differences from Class 150 ===
Class 172s have fewer seats than the Class 150s they replaced, but greater overall capacity due to the increased room for standing passengers as well as wider aisles intended to speed boarding and alighting and reduce waiting time in stations. The trains are air-conditioned and have no opening windows, unlike the Class 150s.

The Class 172 is designed to a 23 m (75 ft 6 in) body length, as opposed to the 20 m (65 ft 7 in) length used on previous Class 150 Sprinter DMUs, to increase capacity.

== Operators ==
=== West Midlands Railway ===
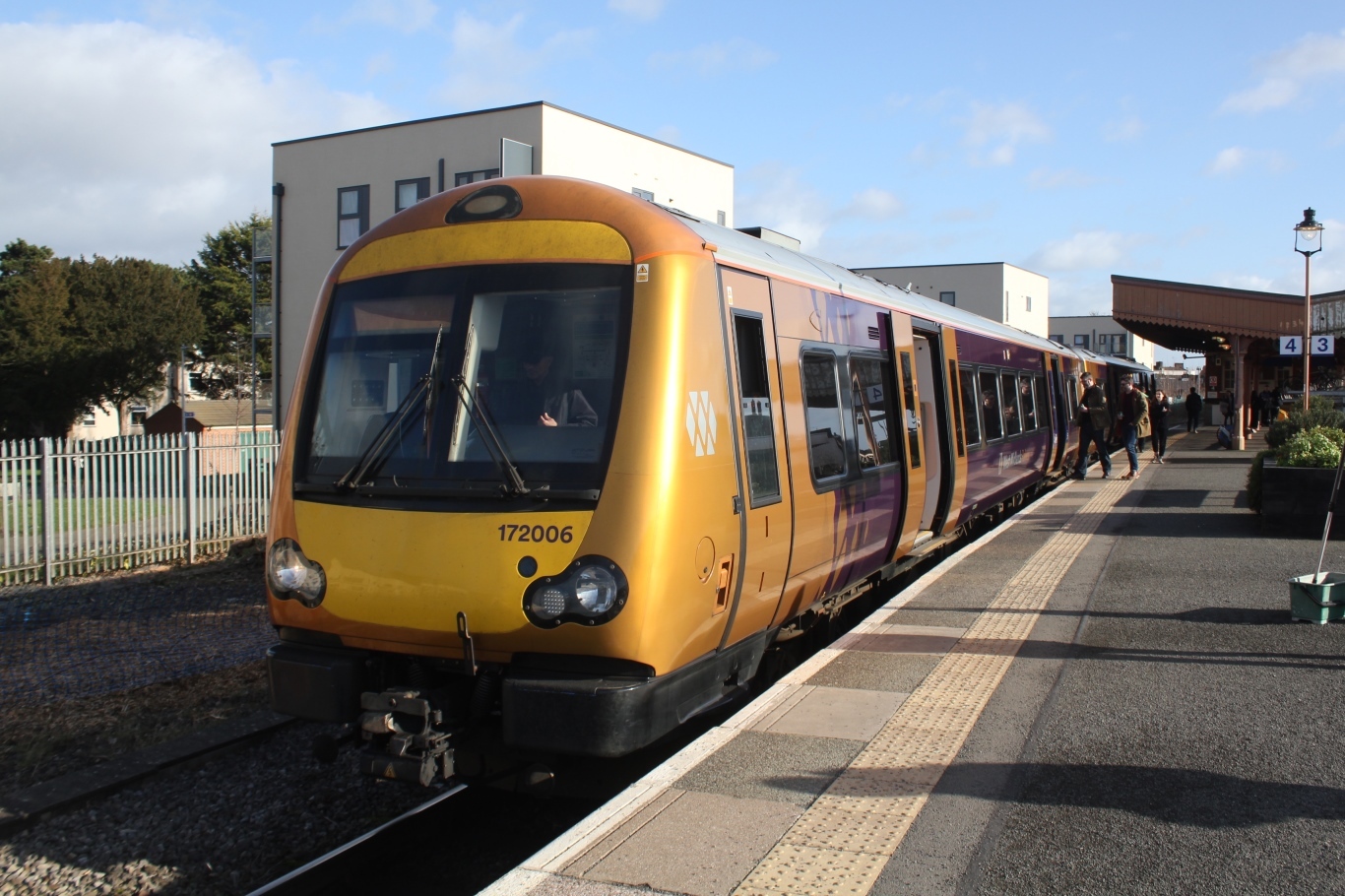
Leamington Spa in 2020

West Midlands Trains operate a total of 39 two-car and three-car units, 27 of which had been ordered by predecessor London Midland; it had originally planned for them to enter service by the end of 2010 on services to and from Birmingham Snow Hill, replacing Class 150s. The original West Midlands Trains sets have revised front ends with end gangways which make the trains look like the Electrostar family of units.

From 1 September 2011, the units started operating on the Snow Hill Lines with some weekend work from Birmingham - Hereford. When first used in service, the units suffered a fault with engine vibration in the passenger cabin, which has since been rectified.

The units were originally meant to replace all of the Class 150s, however three were retained. Between late 2018 and early 2019 the London Overground 172/0s moved to West Midlands Railway, operated by West Midlands Trains, to replace the remaining Class 150s for transfer to Arriva Rail North and Class 153s operating on the Coventry–Leamington line and the Coventry to Nuneaton line as well as providing extra capacity on the Snow Hill Lines.

== Former operators ==
=== London Overground ===
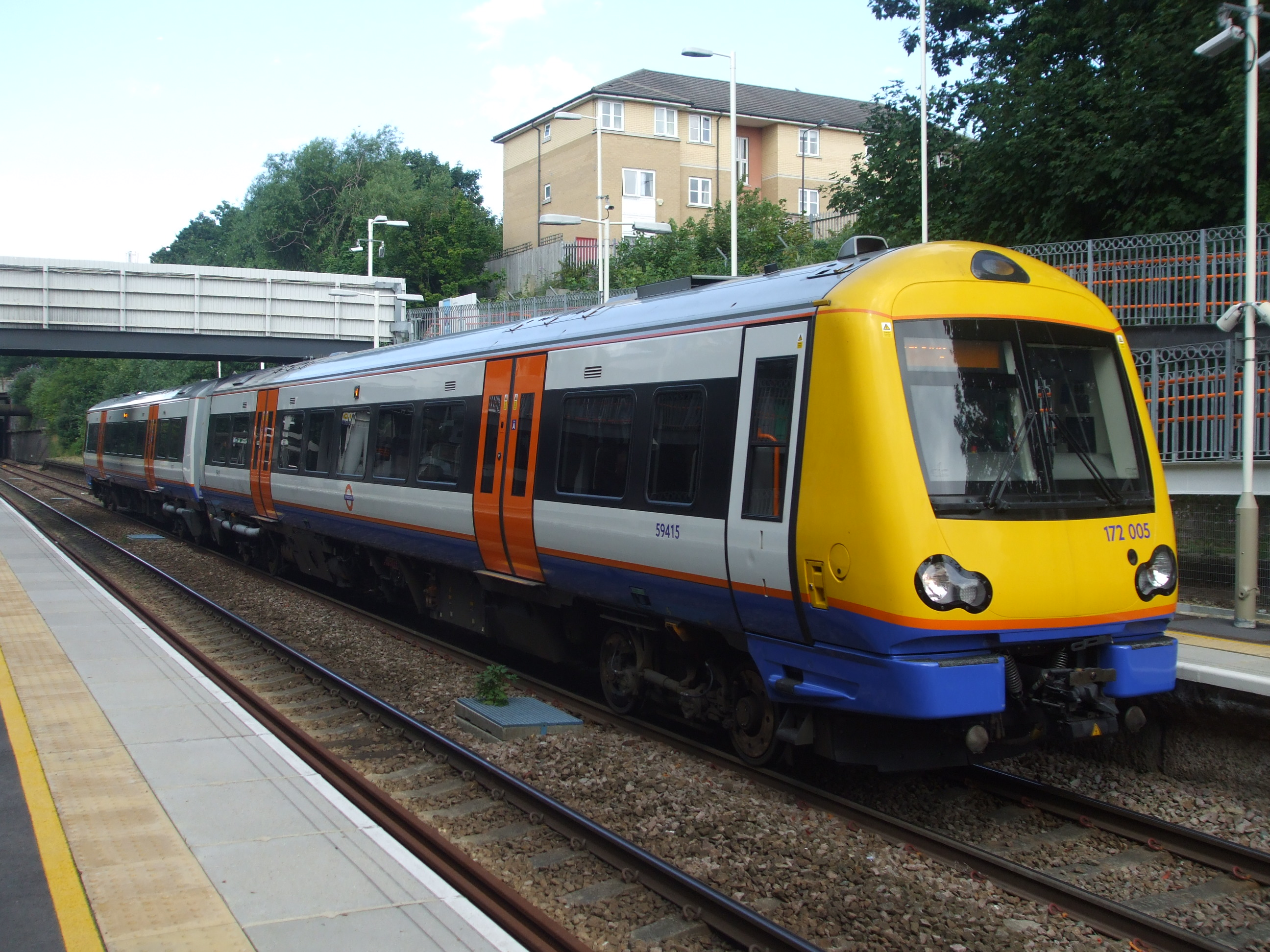
London Overground Class 172/0 at Walthamstow Queen's Road

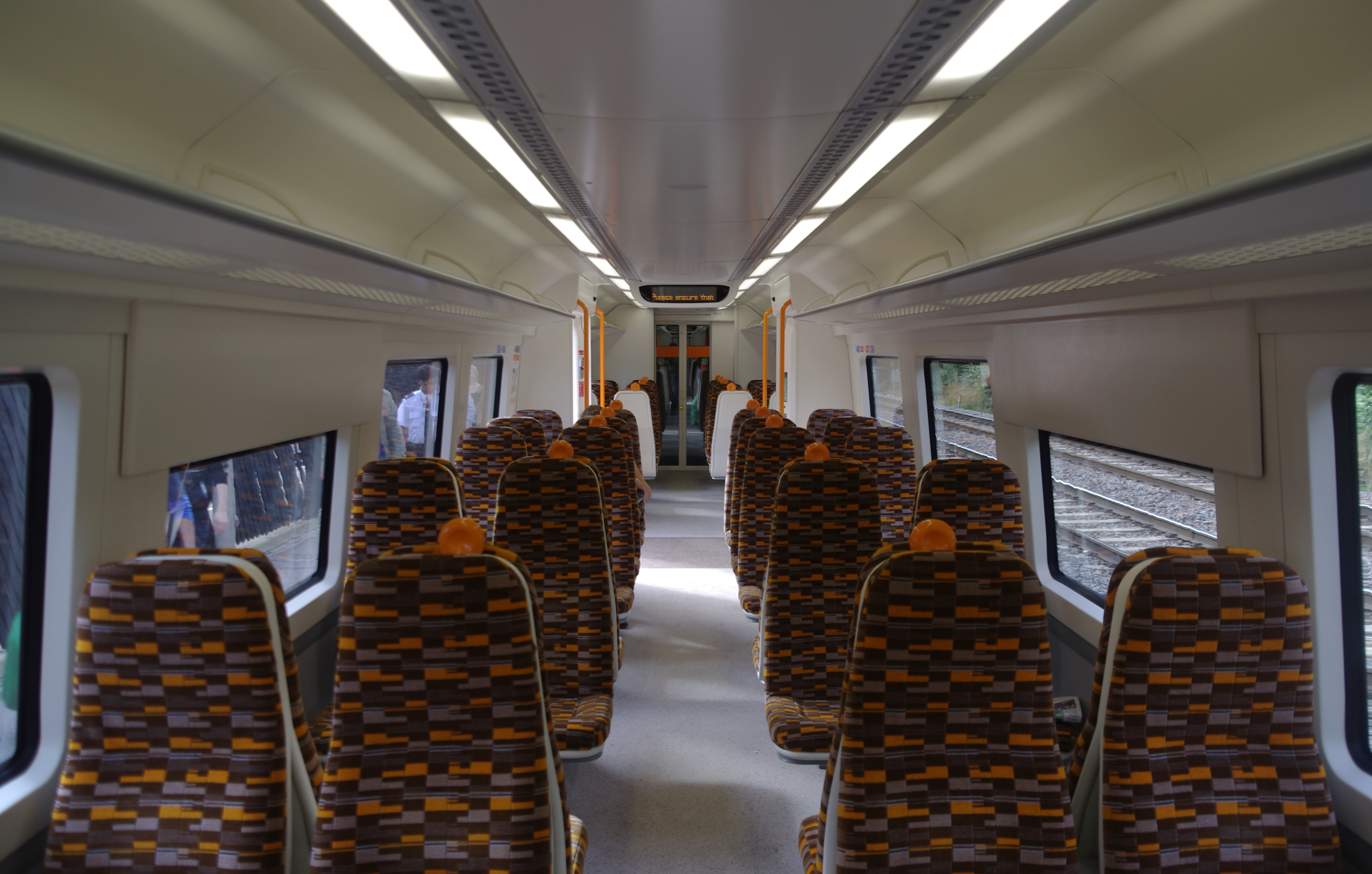
The interior of a London Overground Class 172/0

London Overground operated eight two-car Class 172s on the Gospel Oak to Barking line, replacing the old Class 150 stock. The units were originally meant to be in service from February 2010, but due to production issues and then what were thought to be exhaust problems (which proved to be a false alarm), the trains entered service only in July 2010, and at reduced capacity due to staff training problems. By December 2010, the whole fleet was in service, allowing the Class 150s to be cascaded to First Great Western and other operators. The units were leased by Angel Trains.

The success of London Overground's operation of the Gospel Oak to Barking Line meant that the two-car Class 172s eventually proved insufficient in terms of capacity. Initially, there were plans to replace them with 3- or 4-car DMUs. Later, the government announced plans to electrify the line, with the intention that TfL would procure a new fleet of 4-car EMUs (Class 710) for use on both this route and the inner-suburban routes from Liverpool Street, taken over by London Overground from 2015.

Electrification was completed in February 2018 (later than the original target of June 2017) and as of June 2018 the Class 172 units were set to be replaced by Class 710 EMUs from November 2018, although this did not happen as planned. They were temporarily replaced by Class 378s redeployed from other parts of the London Overground network and moved to West Midlands Trains in March 2019. By May 2019, Class 710s started to be introduced into service.

=== Chiltern Railways ===
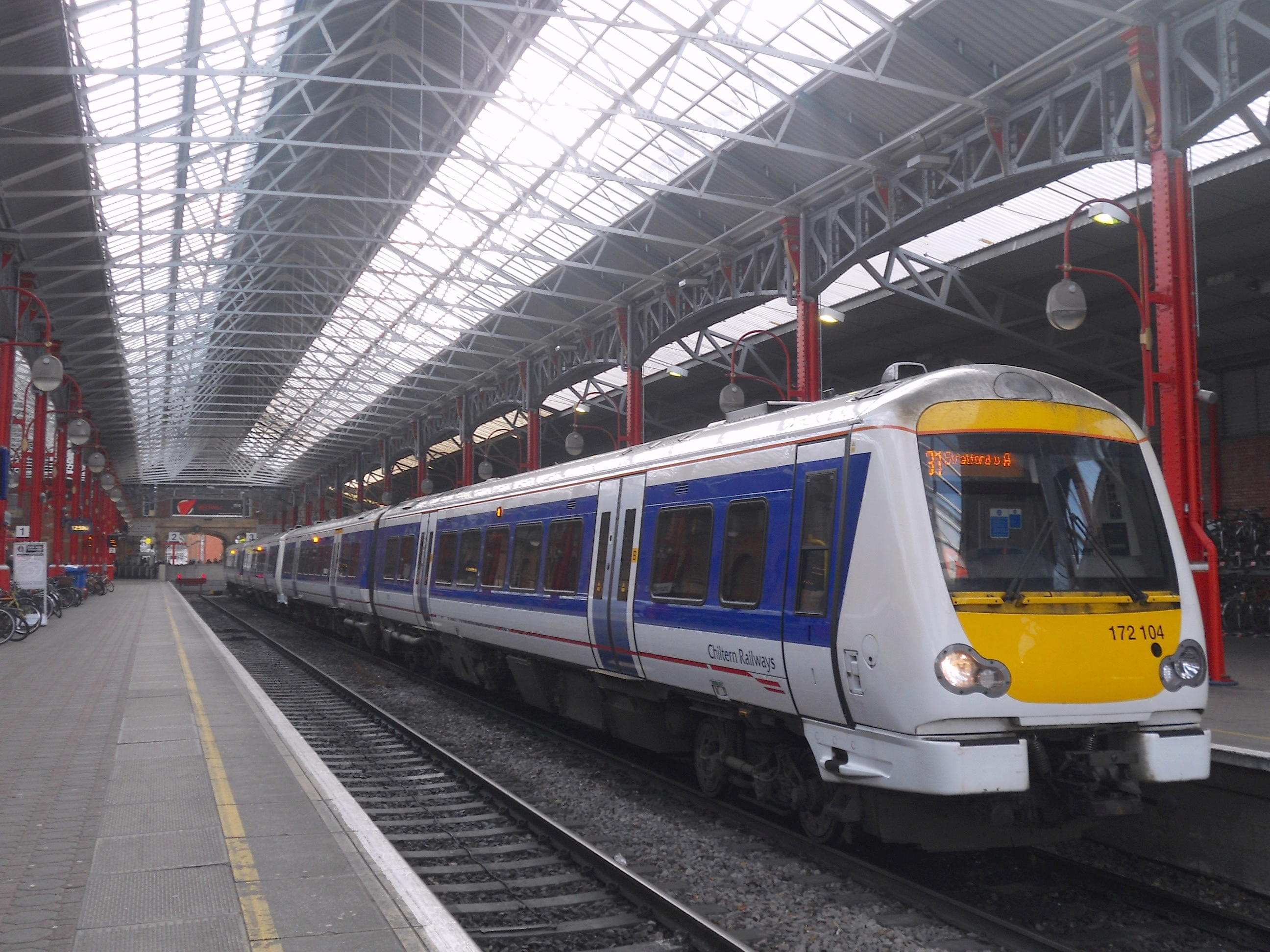
A pair of Chiltern Railways Class 172/1 units at London Marylebone

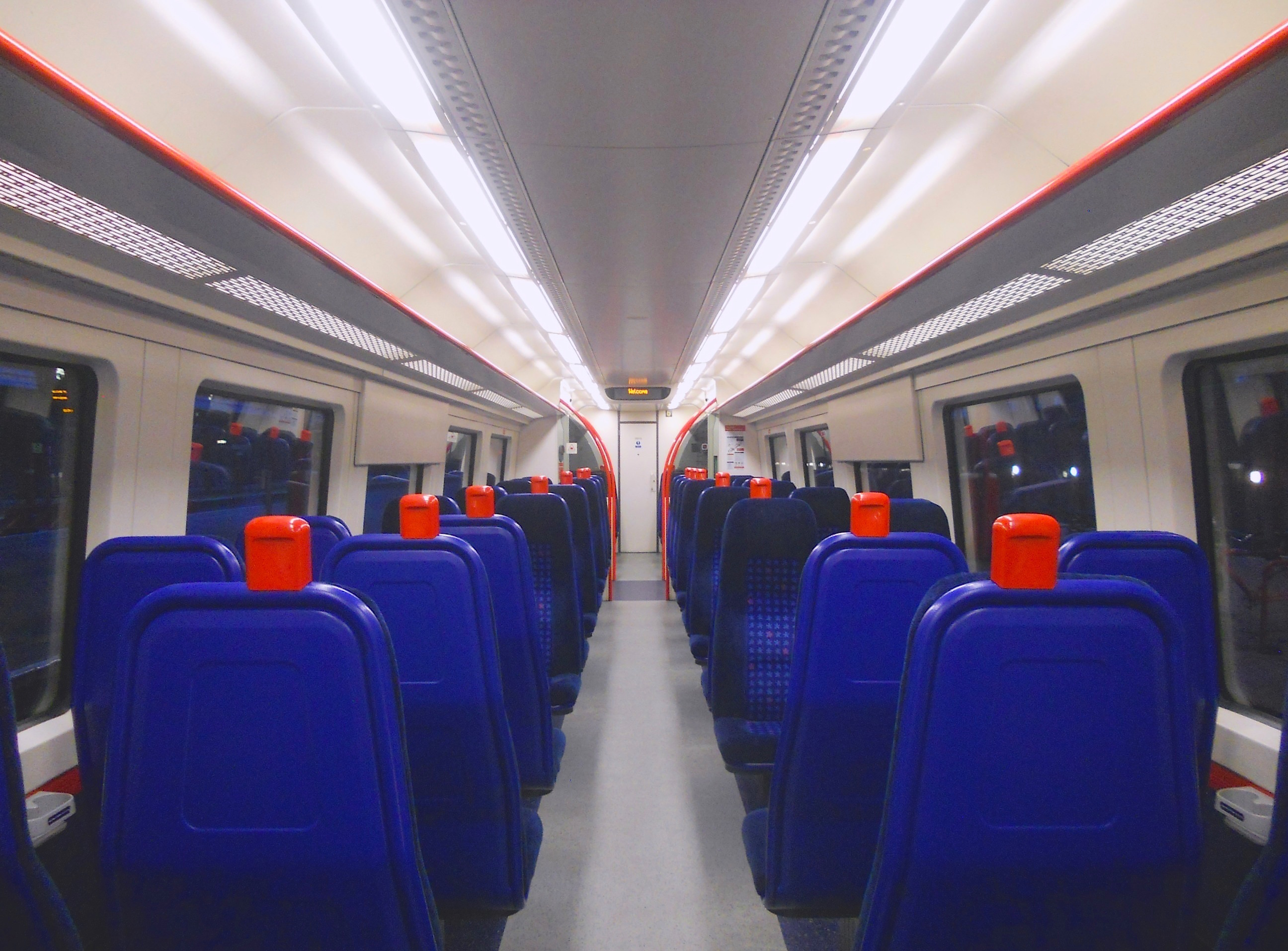
The interior of a Chiltern Railways Class 172/1

Chiltern Railways obtained four two-car trains in the same order as that of London Overground to supplement the Class 168 on its routes from London Marylebone, originally due to be delivered from late 2010. They did not have the tripcock safety system installed—unlike the rest of the Chiltern Railways fleet—as the design of the bogie being used (based on the B5005 found on Class 220 Voyager and Class 222 Meridian trains) meant there was no place for the brackets to be mounted. Thus, they were not able to operate on the Aylesbury via Amersham line whilst the current signalling system was in place unless running in multiple with other units on both the front and rear ends, which were fitted with a tripcock.

In 2021, all of Chiltern Railways Class 172s were leased to West Midlands Trains for use with their existing Class 172 fleet pending the delivery of Class 196 Civity trains. It was later announced that the Class 172/1 fleet will not be returning to Chiltern once the Class 196s entered service with WMT.

== Introduction into service ==
In late 2007 and early 2008, orders were placed with Bombardier by two rolling-stock leasing companies to purchase a number of Class 172 Turbostar trains. In December 2007, Porterbrook ordered 15 three-car and 12 two-car trains for London Midland for delivery in 2010. In January 2008, Angel Trains, on behalf of London Overground and Chiltern Railways, ordered 12 two-car trains for delivery, which would have been delivered during 2009. But difficulties over deliveries by Bombardier's suppliers led to delays in filling the Class 377/378 Electrostar orders, with subsequent knock-on delays for building the Class 172 sets. Work began at the end of 2009 after the freeing-up of one of Bombardier's production lines following completion of the Class 377 order for First Capital Connect.

Eight 172/0 units were built for London Overground. Testing of the first batch of new units, the 172/0 sets for London Overground, commenced in March 2010 on the Old Dalby Test Track. All units were subsequently delivered to Willesden Traction Maintenance Depot (TMD).

All eight 172/0 units entered service for London Overground. These were originally restricted to a top speed of 40 miles per hour (64 km/h) as opposed to their intended design speed of 100 mph (160 km/h), as it was thought there was a fault with the exhaust system requiring modifications to the original design and the already procured units. It was expected that units for London Midland and Chiltern would be delayed by a further 6–12 months. However, it transpired that the exhaust emission testing had been flawed and that there were no major problems with the units or the original design. Production therefore continued as planned with a slight delay.

The four Chiltern Railways units entered service during summer 2011 and left for West Midlands Railway in spring 2021.

== Further potential orders ==
In 2008, First Great Western applied to the Department for Transport to re-equip its Cardiff to Portsmouth via Bristol services with 11 new four-car DMUs which would potentially allow the existing Class 158 Express Sprinter trains to be transferred to other services. According to the West of England Partnership, these were likely to be "similar to Class 170s", suggesting that they might be Class 172 Turbostars.

The Government announced in December 2008 that Bombardier, with its Turbostar design, was one of the pre-qualified bidders for the first 200 DMU vehicles of its planned 1300 new carriages. These new trains were intended for services operated by First Great Western, First TransPennine Express and Northern Rail. However, with the announcement of the electrification schemes in the North West and on the Great Western Main Line, the DMU order was cancelled, with the needs of the train operating companies planned to be met by transfers of existing stock.

Arriva Rail North and TransPennine Express (First Group) did subsequently obtain new DMU and bi-mode rolling stock, although this was produced by CAF and Hitachi and also in higher quantities - 58 CAF DMUs were allocated to Arriva Rail North alone, whereas the 61 cancelled 172s (42x 3-car and 19x 4-car) would have been split up into allocations for three operators.

Bombardier offered the Class 172 Turbostar to NI Railways for its "New Trains Two" specification, eventually losing out to CAF and a variation of NIR's existing Class 3000.

== Fleet details ==
Class	Operator	Qty.	Year built	Cars per unit	Unit nos.
172/0	West Midlands Trains	8	2010	2	172001–172008
172/1	West Midlands Trains	4	2011	2	172101–172104
172/2	West Midlands Trains	12	2011	2	172211–172222
172/3	West Midlands Trains	15	2011	3	172331–172345

=== Vehicle weights ===
Class	DMOS vehicles	MOS vehicles	DMOSLW vehicles
172/0	41.85 t (41.19 long tons; 46.13 short tons)	—	42.40 t (41.73 long tons; 46.74 short tons)
172/1	41.85 t (41.19 long tons; 46.13 short tons)	—	42.40 t (41.73 long tons; 46.74 short tons)
172/2	41.87 t (41.21 long tons; 46.15 short tons)	—	42.49 t (41.82 long tons; 46.84 short tons)
172/3	41.87 t (41.21 long tons; 46.15 short tons)	38.75 t (38.14 long tons; 42.71 short tons)	42.49 t (41.82 long tons; 46.84 short tons)

=== Illustrations ===
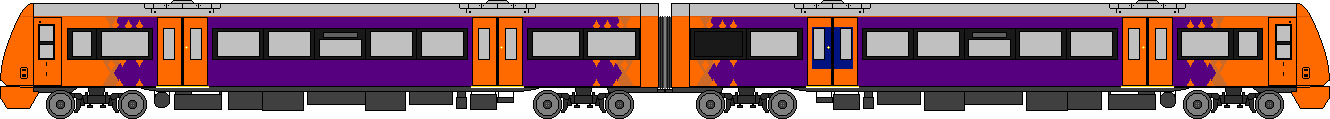
West Midlands Trains Class 172/0 and Class 172/1

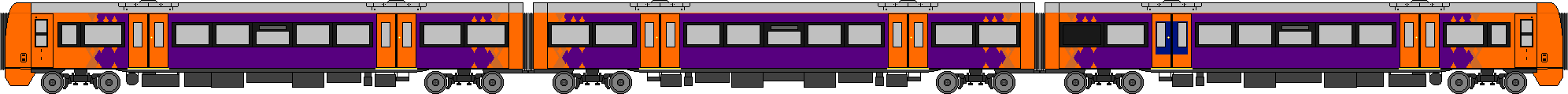
West Midlands Trains Class 172/3

=== Named units ===
One unit has received a name:

172342: Roger Sumner - in honour of a driver at Worcester who retired in late 2022 after almost 60 years of service. He was the last employee at West Midlands Trains to have previously worked on steam locomotives for British Rail.
