= Cradley Heath railway station =

Railway station in the West Midlands, England

Coordinates: 52.470°N 2.090°W

Cradley Heath
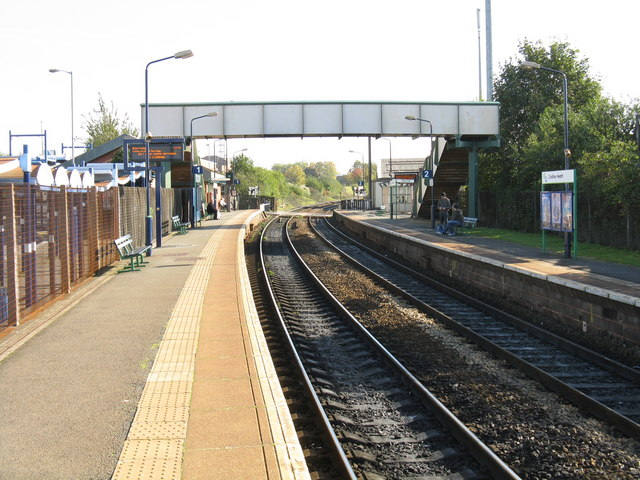

General information
- Location: Cradley Heath, Sandwell; England
- Grid reference: SO939857
- Manager: West Midlands Trains
- Platforms: 2

Other information
- Station code: CRA
- Classification: DfT category E

History
- Opened: 1863

Passengers
- 2021/22: ▲0.468 million
- 2022/23: ▲0.539 million
- 2023/24: ▲0.627 million
- 2024/25: ▲0.719 million
- 2025/26: ▲0.814 million
Location
Notes
- Passenger statistics from the Office of Rail and Road

Cradley Heath railway station serves the town of Cradley Heath in the West Midlands of England. It is on the Birmingham to Worcester via Kidderminster line. The station is managed by West Midlands Railway, who provide the majority of train services; there are also occasional services provided by Chiltern Railways.

Cradley Heath bus station is right in front of the railway station; together they form Cradley Heath Interchange.

== History ==
The station was opened in 1863 by the Stourbridge Railway, on their line from Stourbridge Junction to Old Hill. This was later taken over by the Great Western Railway, who incorporated it into their line to Birmingham. Historically, the station was known as Cradley, and later as Cradley Heath and Cradley.

The present station buildings date from the mid-1980s when the station was rebuilt entirely on the west side of the level crossing. Previously there had been a staggered platform arrangement on either side of the crossing.

=== Incidents ===
Following an incident on 7 October 1954, lamp-man Anthony Rivers was awarded the George Medal and the Order of Industrial Heroism. Rivers had gone to assist a woman whose foot was caught in a level crossing between the station's platforms. As a train bore down on them, he realised he could not free her, so held her away from the tracks and the train severed her foot. In doing so, he suffered a fractured pelvis and a broken forearm.

== Services ==
West Midlands Railway:

The Monday to Saturday off-peak service sees trains approximately every 15 minutes in each direction, operated by West Midlands Trains.

Eastbound:

- 4 trains per hour (tph) to Birmingham Snow Hill and Birmingham Moor Street
  - 2tph to Whitlocks End via Smethwick Galton Bridge and Shirley
    - of which one continues to Stratford-upon-Avon via the North Warwickshire Line
  - 2tph to Dorridge via Smethwick Galton Bridge and Solihull
    - of which one continues to Stratford-upon-Avon via Lapworth
      - Two evening weekday West Midlands Railway services to Leamington Spa.

Westbound:

- 4 trains per hour to Kidderminster via Stourbridge Junction:
  - of which two continue to Worcester Foregate Street via Droitwich Spa
  - Some services reverse or terminate at Worcester Shrub Hill.

Chiltern Railways also serve the station with one train to Stourbridge Junction at weekday nighttime only, from London Marylebone. A morning service to Marylebone runs on Sunday mornings only.

Regular direct services to and from Birmingham New Street (the terminus for all eastbound trains between 1967 and the reopening of the line to Snow Hill in 1995) ceased in May 2004 and passengers wishing to travel there must now change at Galton Bridge.

Preceding station	National Rail	Following station
Rowley Regis	West Midlands Railway Stratford–Whitlocks End–Kidderminster	Stourbridge Junction
Old Hill	West Midlands Railway Stratford–Dorridge–Worcester	Lye
Old Hill	Chiltern Railways Chiltern Main Line	Lye

== Bus interchange ==
Alongside the railway station there is a bus station with five bus stands, which opened during the 1980s. The bus station was extensively rebuilt from 2014 to 2015, and reopened in July 2015 as Cradley Heath Interchange. The bus station is owned and operated by Transport for West Midlands which charges operators for their usage. Services are operated by National Express West Midlands and Diamond Bus. The former Midland Red bus depot stands across the road from the interchange and is now Hawks Cycles.
