= Lye railway station =

Railway station in the West Midlands, England

Coordinates: 52°27′36″N 2°06′56″W

Lye
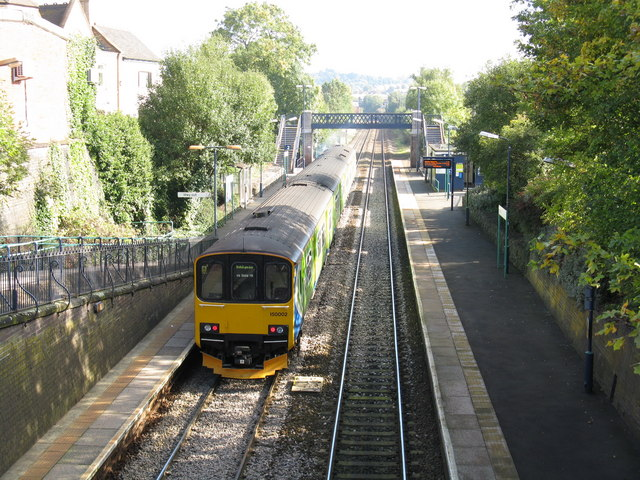

General information
- Location: Lye, Dudley; England
- Grid reference: SO922846
- Manager: West Midlands Trains
- Transit authority: Transport for West Midlands
- Platforms: 2

Other information
- Station code: LYE
- Fare zone: 5
- Classification: DfT category E

History
- Opened: 1863

Passengers
- 2021/22: ▲49,792
- 2022/23: ▲62,188
- 2023/24: ▲73,912
- 2024/25: ▲81,124
- 2025/26: ▲98,034
Location
Notes
- Passenger statistics from the Office of Rail and Road

Lye railway station serves the town of Lye in the Metropolitan Borough of Dudley, West Midlands, England. The station is managed by West Midlands Trains, who provide the majority of train services; Chiltern Railways also operate a small number of trains. It is situated on the Birmingham-Stourbridge line.

== History ==
Lye station was opened in 1863 by the Stourbridge Railway, on their line from Stourbridge Junction to Old Hill. This was later taken over by the Great Western Railway, who incorporated it into their line to Birmingham.

Lye railway station has the joint-shortest railway station name in the United Kingdom.

The ticket office is no longer open, however there are ticket machines on the station platform.

== Services ==
The typical Monday-Saturday daytime service is a West Midlands Railway train every 30 minutes. Services run between Worcester Foregate Street or Worcester Shrub Hill via Stourbridge Junction and Birmingham Snow Hill with 1 train per hour extending to Stratford-upon-Avon. Trains run via or terminate at Dorridge, some services run to Leamington Spa or Whitlocks End in the weekday evenings. On Sundays, trains are hourly.

There are additional services at peak times, including one Chiltern Railways service to Stourbridge Junction at weekday nighttime only, from London Marylebone. There is no return service from Lye.

| Preceding station | National Rail | Following station |
|---|---|---|
| Cradley Heath | West Midlands Railway; Leamington–Worcester | Stourbridge Junction |
| Cradley Heath | Chiltern Railways; London–Stourbridge Junction; Limited service | Stourbridge Junction |
