= Danzey Green =

Hamlet in Warwickshire, England

Coordinates: 52.321867°N 1.818600°W

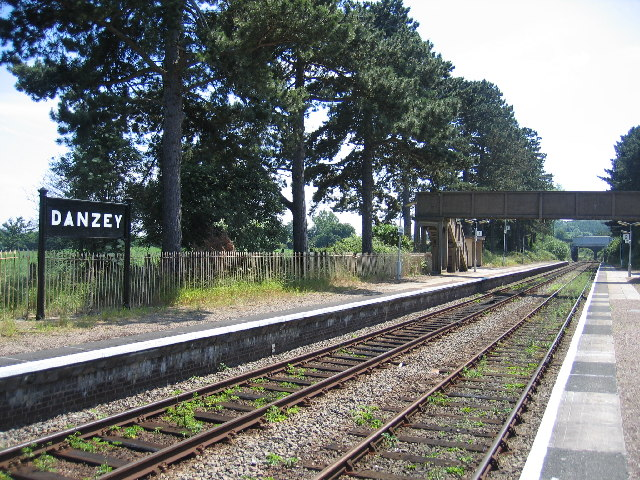
- Danzey railway station

- Location within Warwickshire
- OS grid reference: SP122695
- Civil parish: Tanworth-in-Arden
- District: Stratford-on-Avon
- Shire county: Warwickshire
- Region: West Midlands
- Country: England
- Sovereign state: United Kingdom
- Post town: SOLIHULL
- Postcode district: B94
- Dialling code: 01789
- Police: Warwickshire
- Fire: Warwickshire
- Ambulance: West Midlands
- UK Parliament: Stratford-on-Avon

Danzey Green, sometimes known locally as simply Danzey, is a small rural hamlet in Warwickshire, England. It is within the civil parish of Tanworth-in-Arden, the village of which is around one mile to the north-west. Just east of Danzey is the River Alne. It is situated 16.4 miles (26.4 km) south south-east of Birmingham, 13.5 miles (21.7 km) east of Bromsgrove and 12.1 miles (19.5 km) north north-west of Stratford-upon-Avon.

It is served by Danzey railway station on the adjacent North Warwickshire Line.

Danzey Green was once home to a windmill, which was built in 1830, but it stopped working in 1874 after being damaged in a severe storm. In 1969 the windmill was dismantled and then reassembled at the Avoncroft Museum of Historic Buildings in nearby Worcestershire and restored to working order.
