= Wood End railway station =

Railway station in Warwickshire, England

Coordinates: 52.344°N 1.845°W

Wood End
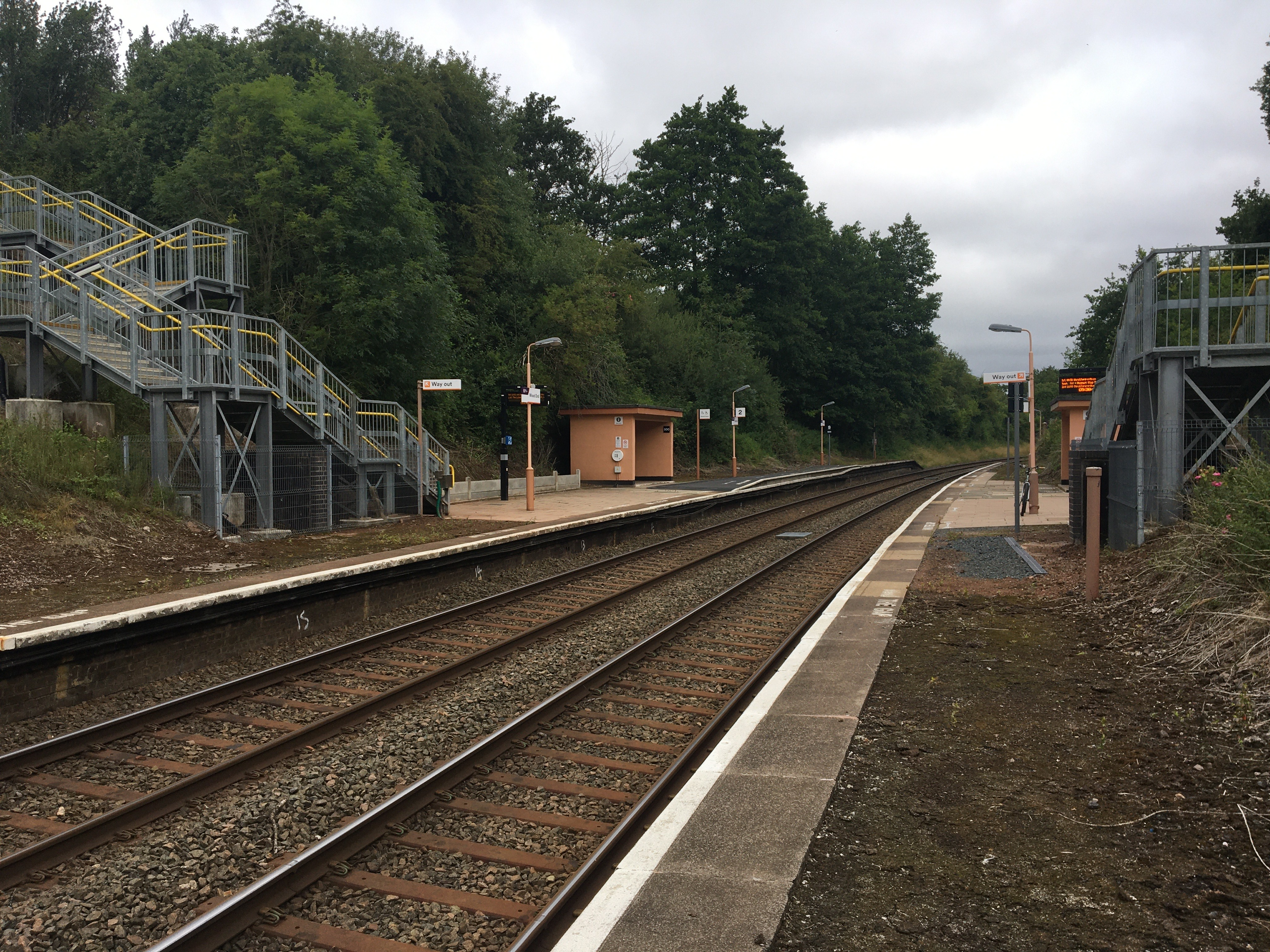
- Wood End station in July 2020

General information
- Location: Wood End, Stratford-on-Avon; England
- Grid reference: SP106718
- Manager: West Midlands Trains
- Platforms: 2

Other information
- Station code: WDE
- Classification: DfT category F2

Passengers
- 2021/22: ▲9,426
- 2022/23: ▲10,966
- 2023/24: ▲13,206
- 2024/25: ▲15,744
- 2025/26: ▲19,552
Location
Notes
- Passenger statistics from the Office of Rail and Road

Wood End is a railway station on the North Warwickshire Line serving the village of Wood End in Warwickshire, England. It received around 36 passengers a day in 2023/24.

Situated on the Stratford-upon-Avon to Birmingham route, the station was opened by the Great Western Railway in 1908 along with the line, and was originally known as Wood End Platform, the suffix was later dropped. The station is located in a deep cutting. Immediately to the south of the station is Wood End tunnel, which is 175 yards (160 m) long.

In 2014, the footbridge over the line was removed and new stairs were installed leading to both platforms from the main road.

== Services ==
The service in each direction between Worcester and Stratford via Birmingham runs hourly on Mondays to Saturdays. Until the May 2023 timetable change the station was a request stop, meaning passengers wishing to board a train here needed to signal to the driver their intent to board; those wishing to alight needing to inform the train conductor.

There is no Sunday service.

Preceding station	National Rail	Following station
The Lakes	West Midlands Railway; North Warwickshire Line	Danzey
