= London Midland =

Former British train operating company

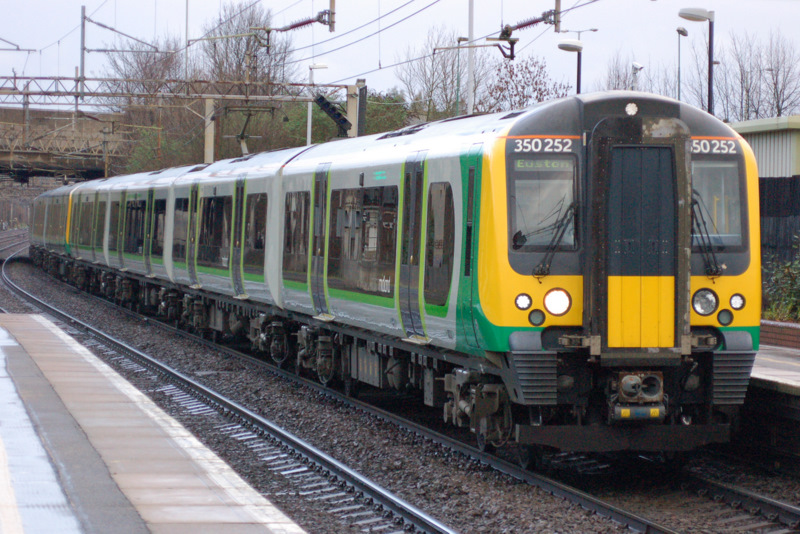
- Class 350 Desiro at Watford Junction in 2011

Overview
- Franchises: West Midlands; 11 November 2007 – 10 December 2017
- Main regions: West Midlands, London
- Other regions: North West, East Midlands
- Stations called at: 178
- Stations operated: 146
- Parent company: Govia
- Reporting mark: LM
- Predecessor: Central Trains; Silverlink
- Successor: West Midlands Trains

Technical
- Length: 539.0 mi (867.4 km)

Other
- Website: www.londonmidland.com
Route map

London Midland was a British train operating company which operated the West Midlands franchise between 11 November 2007 and 10 December 2017. It was owned by the British transport group Govia.

London Midland was created as a result of Govia being awarded the West Midlands franchise on 22 June 2007. This franchise had emerged from a reorganisation conducted by the Department for Transport, which had combined elements of the Silverlink and Central Trains operations together. London Midland had various commitments to fulfil during the franchise period, including the procurement of at least 37 new multiple units, the introduction of a semi-fast service between London and Crewe, and to invest at least £11.5m into stations. Early rolling stock orders totalled 66 new trains, including two Class 139 Parry People Movers, 12 two-car and 15 three-car Class 172 Turbostars and 37 four-car Class 350/2 Desiros. Further orders and reorganisations of rolling stock would occur during the franchise period, although one effort, a planned year-long trial of the prototype Vivarail Class 230 DMU on the Coventry–Nuneaton line, had to be cancelled after the prototype suffered fire damage.

London Midland operated local services in the West Midlands and surrounding areas through its City sub-brand. It also provided long-distance and commuter services on the West Coast Main Line through the Express sub-brand from London Euston to and from the West Midlands, Hertfordshire, Buckinghamshire, Bedfordshire, Northamptonshire, Staffordshire and Cheshire. Additionally, services on the Stourbridge Town branch line operated by Pre Metro Operations were branded as the London Midland Stourbridge Shuttle. The franchise was originally scheduled to expire in September 2015; this was extended to March 2016, and once again to October 2017 in return for London Midland's agreement to put on extra trains and enact other service improvements in this additional time. During July 2017, London Midland's franchise was further extended until 10 December 2017, after which point the new franchisee, West Midlands Trains, took over operations.

== History ==
The creation of London Midland came out of a wider initiative within the Department for Transport to redraw some of the passenger rail franchises that were operating in the mid-2000s. Specifically, it was decided to break up the Silverlink network pending its renewal in November 2007; the Silverlink Metro services were transferred to the control of Transport for London under the banner of the London Overground, while the Silverlink County services were merged with the Central Trains services around Birmingham to create a new West Midlands franchise.

The Central Trains franchise had also been selected for reorganisation, its operator having acquired an unfavourable reputation for poor timekeeping: its best performing period between 2000 and 2007 still saw one in six trains five minutes late or more, with punctuality figures dropping as low as 61% in 2003. The company also suffered from ongoing staff-relations problems which led to extensive and long-lasting cancellations of Sunday services. It was originally announced that the Central Trains franchise would end in April 2007, although it was subsequently an extended until November 2007.

The new West Midlands franchise was tendered and competitively bid for by private companies to operate it. On 22 June 2007, the Department for Transport announced it had awarded the West Midlands franchise to the British transport group Govia; the terms of this franchise included a start date of 11 November 2007, an end date of September 2015, an option for the department to end the franchise after six years if Govia did not meet performance targets, and the provision of £1.13bn of subsidy over the course of the franchise, starting with £203m in the first full year and falling to £155m by the last. The company pledged to introduce a new semi-fast service between London and Crewe, acquire at least 37 new multiple units by July 2009, and invest a minimum of £11.5m into its stations.

== Services ==
London Midland's services were divided between four groups of routes: London Euston Routes, Birmingham Regional, West Midlands Local and Branch Lines.

- London Euston Routes included train services between London Euston and Birmingham New Street or Crewe, as well as services which only use a small section of the route (e.g. Northampton – Birmingham New Street).
- Birmingham Regional included longer-distance, semi-fast services between Birmingham New Street and Hereford, Shrewsbury or Liverpool Lime Street.
- West Midlands Local included stopping services through Birmingham to nearby settlements such as Lichfield and Kidderminster.
- Branch Lines included services which operate on branch lines that are essentially separate from the rest of the network.

London Midland operated several "parliamentary train" stations, where only a handful of trains a day call. These include:

- Bordesley; 1 train per week on a Saturday, from Whitlocks End to Great Malvern, plus football specials.
- Polesworth; 1 train per day from Northampton to Crewe.

London Midland also operated stations where it operated no services. These stations are only served by CrossCountry, which does not manage any stations. These included:

- Wilnecote
- Coleshill Parkway
- Water Orton

=== Former services ===
A map of the former London Midland network

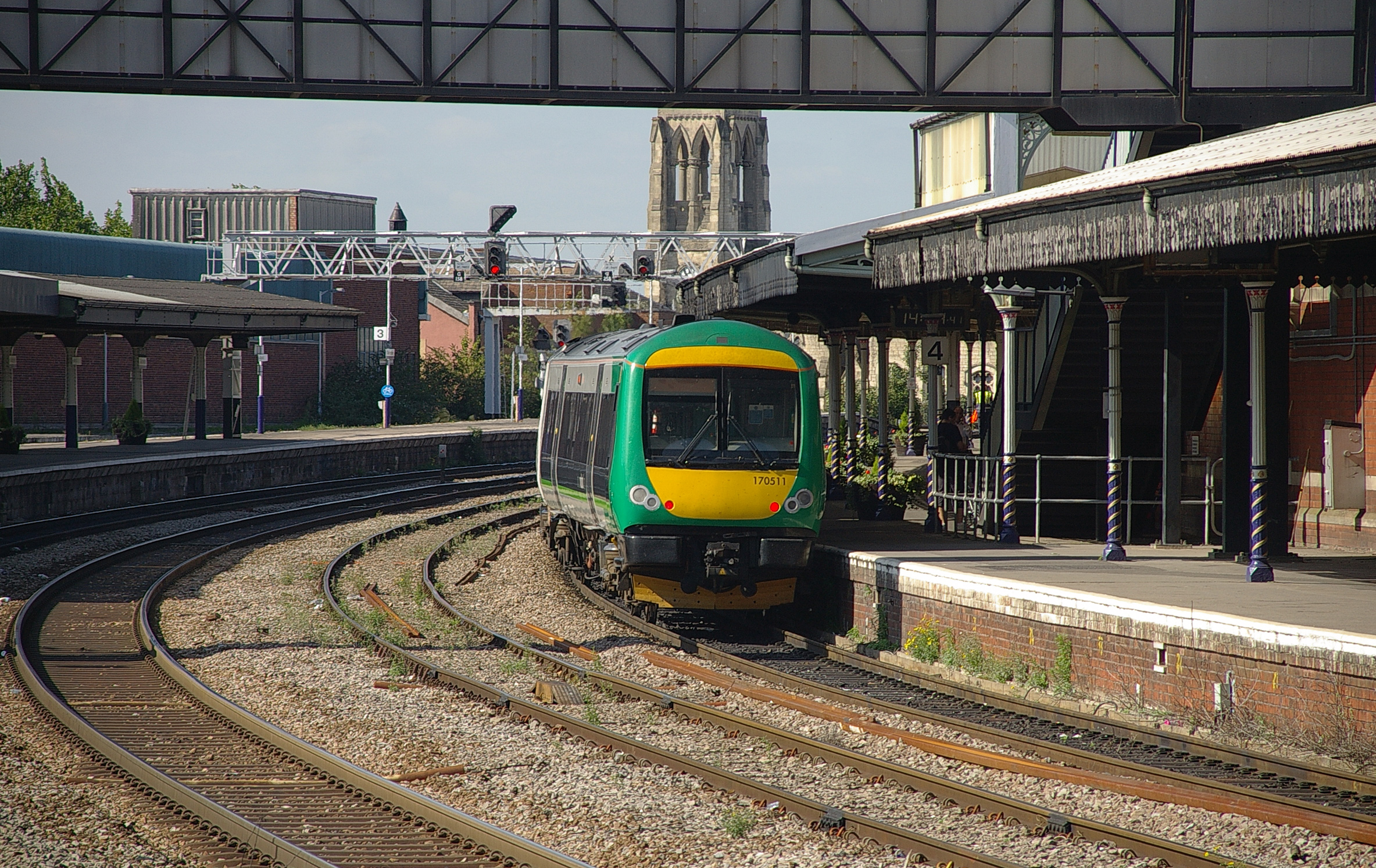
Class 170 at Gloucester.

In December 2008, London Midland discontinued the direct service between Walsall and Wolverhampton. Traffic on the route was low, but growing, and there was a campaign to keep the service. The service was a priced option with the new West Midlands franchise, but the Department for Transport decided not to provide funding from December 2008, and as a result the service ceased. There was only one early morning train on Saturdays from Wolverhampton to Walsall (Parliamentary service).

During December 2008, a two-hourly Worcester Shrub Hill to Gloucester service was introduced to improve transport links between the two cities as well as to provide an increased service at Ashchurch for Tewkesbury. This service was withdrawn in December 2009 because of low passenger use.

=== Proposed services ===
In October 2010, London Midland applied to the Office of Rail Regulation to run a new hourly Birmingham to Preston service from 2016 by diverting every other Birmingham to Liverpool train. The Euston to Crewe service would also then be extended to Liverpool to maintain a half-hourly service between Crewe and Liverpool by 2016. In March 2011, the application was rejected by the Office of Rail Regulation. London Midland also sought to run additional evening and Sunday trains between Euston and Crewe, to satisfy what the company says was unmet demand. From April 2012, London Midland began operating an hourly Euston to Crewe service on Sundays.

In order to win a contract extension, London Midland had agreed to put on extra services, resulting in an extra 6,600 seats per week.

== Performance ==
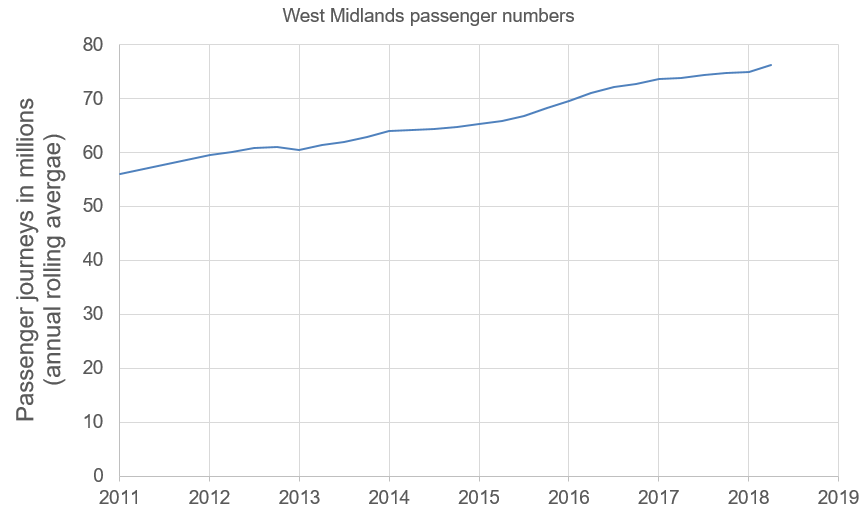
Passenger numbers on the West Midlands franchise from 2010–11 to 2018/19 Q1.

During 2010, London Midland remarked on the high frequency of breakdowns across its fleet, attributing this poor performance as having been primarily due to the outdated rolling stock that it had inherited and was in the process of replacing. In autumn and winter 2012, a significant volume of services suffered cancellations, which was reportedly due to an acute shortage of available train drivers.

Performance since the staff shortages have been varied, reaching a low of 76% for the period between 10 November and 7 December 2013, while rising to a 92.2% for the period 1–26 April 2014. According to figures released by national rail infrastructure operator Network Rail, London Midland's average punctuality since the start of the franchise was 87%.

During September 2013, a new partnership agreement was struck between London Midland and transport authority Centro, which reportedly led to a £10 million investment in station improvements across the West Midlands. 'Transforming Rail Travel' was a deal between the two organisations to continue a two-year arrangement with the aim of delivering further enhancements to services and facilities. During December 2014, the company announced that it would be providing additional seats onboard its trains in its next timetable.

Against a background of ongoing rail strikes nationwide, during January 2017, the National Union of Rail, Maritime and Transport Workers (RMT) announced that it would be balloting guards at London Midland for potential industrial action over concerns regarding the introduction of externally-contracted security staff on its trains at the end of December 2016, which the RMT alleged would replace the role of "safety-critical" guards on some services, paving the way for DOO operation. London Midland denied having plans in place to implement DOO operation on its network. Following negotiations with the RMT, London Midland ceased using externally-contracted security staff on its trains on 30 January; as a result, the RMT suspended its ballot on 2 February, averting potential industrial action, before formally declaring the dispute closed.

== Rolling stock ==
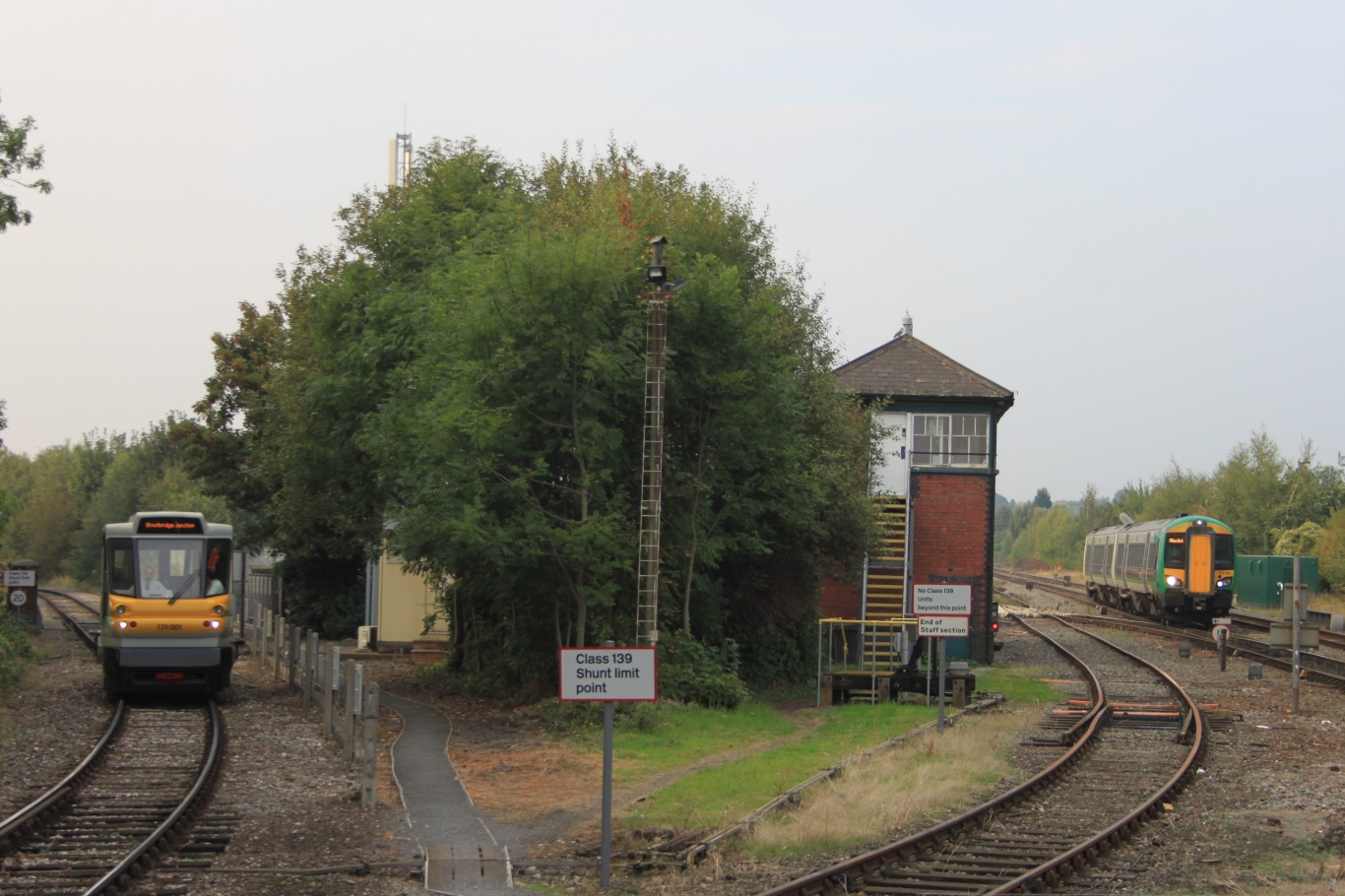
A pair of trains approach Stourbridge Junction; both were procured by London Midland after gaining the franchise – a Class 139 railcar on the left arrives with a service from Stourbridge Town, while a Class 172 pulls in with a service towards Kidderminster

London Midland inherited a fleet of Class 150, Class 153, Class 170, Class 321, Class 323 and Class 350/1s from Central Trains and Silverlink.

One of the major franchise commitments was the replacement of the existing fleet of Class 150 and Class 321 units. Upon being awarded the franchise, London Midland ordered a total of 66 new trains of three different types, comprising two Class 139 Parry People Movers, 12 two-car and 15 three-car Class 172 Turbostars and 37 four-car Class 350/2 Desiros.

All but three Class 150 units were cascaded to First Great Western (12 x two-car, 2 x three-car) and Northern Rail (18 x two-car) and the Class 321s to First Capital Connect (13) and National Express East Anglia (17). The Class 153, Class 170 and Class 323 units were all refurbished.

The first of the Class 350/2 units arrived in the UK in early October 2008 for testing at the Northampton Kings Heath Siemens Depot. By July 2009, they were all in service.

London Midland was to lose all of its Class 321 units, but a change of plan saw it retain seven for use both on the Watford Junction to St Albans Abbey branch line and on peak-hour express services between Northampton/Milton Keynes Central/Tring-London Euston. The final seven units moved to Abellio ScotRail in 2015/16, and were replaced by seven Class 319s cascaded from Thameslink.

The two Class 139 railcars were due to enter service on the Stourbridge line with the start of the new timetable on 15 December 2008. However, problems in testing caused a delay in their introduction, with a replacement bus covering the route following the reallocation of the Class 153 originally used. The two railcars finally entered full passenger service in June 2009.

London Midland was to lose all of its Class 150 units, but a change in plan saw it retain three Class 150 units as additional capacity, following a statement from the Department for Transport on 10 August 2011. However, London Midland transferred two Class 153 units to First Great Western as a result. The other Class 150 units were transferred to First Great Western and Northern Rail.

During 2011, London Midland announced that it would be procuring a further 18 four-car Class 350 units, eight for itself and ten for sub-lease to First TransPennine Express. In February 2012, it was announced that 20 Class 350 units had been ordered by London Midland. Ten Class 350/3 units entered service with London Midland, and ten Class 350/4 units with First TransPennine Express.

The franchise agreement included the option of replacing the three remaining Class 150/1 in the fleet with six Class 153 units in June 2017. The Northern franchise agreement indicates this option has been taken up, as the London Midland Class 150 units transferred to Northern in 2017. The Northern franchise agreement also ruled out the option of any additional Class 323 units being leased from Porterbrook to London Midland before 1 January 2019. This option was not taken up as Northern kept its 323s.

In July 2016, London Midland and the West Midlands Combined Authority announced that it would run a year-long trial of the prototype Vivarail Class 230 DMU on the Coventry–Nuneaton line. During January 2017, the trial was abruptly cancelled and the funding withdrawn by the West Midlands Combined Authority as a fire on the trial unit would have caused the trial to be impossible to complete before the end of the franchise.

== Fleet at end of franchise ==
Class	Image	Type	Top speed		Carriages	Number	Routes operated	Built
Class	Image	Type	mph	km/h	Carriages	Number	Routes operated	Built
139		Railcar	40	64	1	2	Stourbridge Town branch line (Note: Operated by Pre Metro Operations on behalf of London Midland; services were branded as London Midland.)	2008
150/1 Sprinter		DMU	75	121	2	3	Marston Vale line; Snow Hill lines	1984–1987
153 Super Sprinter		DMU	75	121	1	8	Marston Vale line; Coventry–Nuneaton line; Snow Hill lines; Birmingham–Rugeley/Shrewsbury	1987–1988
170/5 & 170/6 Turbostar		DMU	100	161	2	17	Birmingham–Rugeley/Shrewsbury/Hereford; Snow Hill lines	1999–2000
170/5 & 170/6 Turbostar		DMU	100	161	3	6	Birmingham–Rugeley/Shrewsbury/Hereford; Snow Hill lines	1999–2000
172/2 & 172/3 Turbostar		DMU	100	161	2	12	Snow Hill Lines	2011
172/2 & 172/3 Turbostar		DMU	100	161	3	15	Snow Hill Lines	2011
319/0, 319/2 & 319/4		EMU	100	161	4	7	Abbey Line; Peak hour West Coast Main Line services	1987–1988
323		EMU	90	145	3	26	Redditch–Lichfield Trent Valley; Wolverhampton–Walsall via Birmingham; Birmingham–Birmingham International	1992–1995
350/1, 350/2 & 350/3 Desiro		EMU	100	161	4	77	London/Northampton–Birmingham; Birmingham–Liverpool; London–Tring/Milton Keynes/Northampton/Crewe; Wolverhampton–Walsall via Birmingham	2004–2014
350/1, 350/2 & 350/3 Desiro		EMU	110	177	4	77	London/Northampton–Birmingham; Birmingham–Liverpool; London–Tring/Milton Keynes/Northampton/Crewe; Wolverhampton–Walsall via Birmingham	2004–2014

=== Past fleet ===
Former units operated by London Midland include:

Class	Image	Type	Carriages	Number	Built	Withdrawn
321/4		EMU	4	37	1989–1990	2009–2015

== Incidents ==
On 26 November 2015, an early morning commuter service caught fire during the morning commuter rush and passengers had to be evacuated at Lapworth Station.

== Demise ==
In April 2016, the Department for Transport (DfT) announced that Govia, MTR Corporation and a consortium of Abellio, East Japan Railway Company (JR East) and Mitsui had been shortlisted to bid for the next franchise. The Invitation to Tender (ITT) was issued in August 2016 and the franchise was due to be awarded in June 2017. During July 2016, MTR Corporation announced its withdrawal from the bidding process.

During July 2017, the franchise was extended until 10 December 2017. In August 2017, the franchise was awarded to the consortium led by Abellio. The new company, named West Midlands Trains, commenced operations on 10 December 2017.

== See also ==
- London, Midland and Scottish Railway
- London Midland Region of British Railways

== Footnotes ==
Preceded by Central Trains; Central Trains franchise	Operator of West Midlands franchise 2007–2017	Succeeded by West Midlands Trains
Preceded by Silverlink; North London Railways franchise	Operator of West Midlands franchise 2007–2017	Succeeded by West Midlands Trains
