= Henley-in-Arden railway station =

Railway station on the North Warwickshire line

Coordinates: 52.291°N 1.784°W

Henley-in-Arden
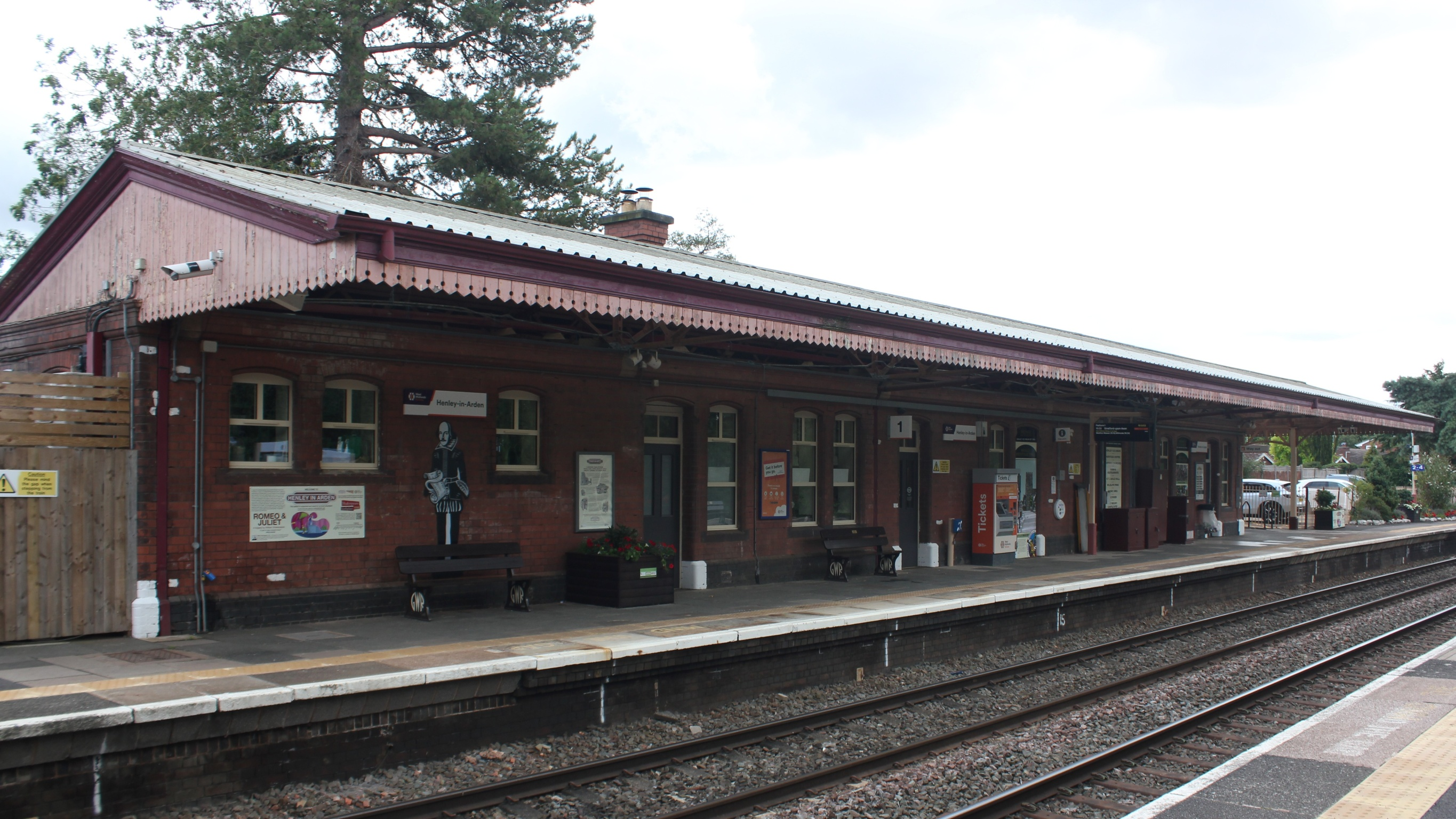
- The station in 2025

General information
- Location: Henley-in-Arden, Stratford-on-Avon; England
- Grid reference: SP148659
- Manager: West Midlands Trains
- Platforms: 2

Other information
- Station code: HNL
- Classification: DfT category F1

Passengers
- 2020/21: ▼30,204
- 2021/22: ▲67,592
- 2022/23: ▲69,652
- 2023/24: ▲77,762
- 2024/25: ▲88,760
- 2025/26: ▲98,350
Location
Notes
- Passenger statistics from the Office of Rail and Road

Henley-in-Arden is a railway station serving the town of Henley-in-Arden, Warwickshire, England. It is on the North Warwickshire Line between Birmingham and Stratford-upon-Avon.

== History ==
=== First station and branch line ===
Henley-in-Arden Railway Act 1861
- Act of Parliament
- Parliament of the United Kingdom
- Long title: An Act for making and maintaining of the Henley-in-Arden Railway, and for other Purposes.
- Citation: 24 & 25 Vict. c. lxxvi

Dates
- Royal assent: 28 June 1861

Henley-in-Arden Railway Act 1864
- Act of Parliament
- Parliament of the United Kingdom
- Long title: An Act to extend the Time for completing the Henley-in-Arden Railway, and to raise additional Capital.
- Citation: 27 & 28 Vict. c. cxxxiv

Dates
- Royal assent: 30 June 1864

Text of statute as originally enacted

Henley-in-Arden and Great Western Junction Railway Act 1873
- Act of Parliament
- Parliament of the United Kingdom
- Long title: An Act to incorporate a Company for the purpose of making and maintaining a Railway from the Birmingham and Oxford section of the Great Western Railway in the parish of Rowington and county of Warwick to Henley-in-Arden in the same county; and for other purposes.
- Citation: 36 & 37 Vict. c. ccxxxviii

Dates
- Royal assent: 5 August 1873

Text of statute as originally enacted

Henley-in-Arden and Great Western Junction Railway (Revival of Powers) Act 1884
- Act of Parliament
- Parliament of the United Kingdom
- Long title: An Act to revive the powers and extend the periods for the compulsory purchase of Lands and for the construction of the Railway authorised by the Henley-in-Arden and Great Western Junction Railway Act 1873 and for other purposes.
- Citation: 47 & 48 Vict. c. lxvii

Dates
- Royal assent: 23 June 1884

Birmingham and Henley-in-Arden Railway Act 1888
- Act of Parliament
- Parliament of the United Kingdom
- Long title: An Act to revive the powers and extend the periods for the compulsory purchase of Lands and for the construction of the Railway authorised by the Henley-in-Arden and Great Western Junction Railway Act 1873 and the Henley-in-Arden and Great Western Junction Railway (Revival of Powers) Act 1884 and for other purposes.
- Citation: 51 & 52 Vict. c. clxxxi

Dates
- Royal assent: 7 August 1888

Text of statute as originally enacted

Birmingham and Henley-in-Arden Railway Act 1891
- Act of Parliament
- Parliament of the United Kingdom
- Long title: An Act to extend the time tor the completion of the authorised railway of the Birmingham and Henley-in-Arden Railway Company and for other purposes.
- Citation: 54 & 55 Vict. c. clxxv

Dates
- Royal assent: 28 July 1891

Text of statute as originally enacted

The first railway station at Henley was opened to passengers on 6 June 1894 (and to goods on 2 July 1894) at the end of a short branch line, 3 miles 7 chains (5.0 km) in length, running from Rowington Junction, near Lapworth (then known as Kingswood) on the Great Western Railway (GWR) main line from London to Birmingham. Construction of the branch line began in 1860, but was not finished because of a lack of funding. New authorisation was given in the Birmingham and Henley-in-Arden Railway Act 1891 (54 & 55 Vict. c. clxxv), and construction was again begun again in the 1890s by a new company, the Birmingham and Henley-in-Arden Railway, and completed in June 1894. The branch came under the control of the GWR in 1900.

On 9 December 1907 the North Warwickshire Line was opened for goods traffic; it opened to passengers on 1 July 1908. This connected Henley with a new station, and made the branch line superfluous. A short spur, 32 chains (640 m) in length, was constructed to allow branch line trains to enter the new station, but the old one continued to be used for goods. The branch continued in operation until 1915, when it was closed as a wartime economy measure, and its tracks were taken up to be used for the First World War war effort. Official closure of the 2 miles 59 chains (4.4 km) between Rowington Junction and the old station took place on 1 January 1917. The short spur to the old station continued to be used for goods until December 1962.

=== Current station ===
The current station was opened in 1908 with the North Warwickshire Line, which then was an important main line connecting Birmingham with Cheltenham via Stratford-upon-Avon. The new station was one of the most prestigious on the new line, and was provided with three platforms. One of which was for trains terminating from Birmingham, and for a short period, trains terminating from the old branch line, until it closed.

The station today is unstaffed, and only two of the three original platforms are in use. The original station building and canopy is still extant on one platform, but is now boarded up.

A modern lift-equipped footbridge was installed at the station in 2014, the original footbridge was dismantled and donated to the heritage Gloucestershire Warwickshire Railway where it was re-erected at Broadway.

In 2022, a local community group, Friends of Henley Railway Station, agreed to a 25-year lease of the station building from Network Rail. The following year, the group initiated a renovation of the building intended to return it to its original state, retaining as many features as possible. The renovated building, housing The Station, a community bar/taproom and lounge run by Henley Mile Brewery, a microbrewery also located inside the building, was opened in early 2024 by Lord Peter Hendy, chair of Network Rail. Within two months, local media was reporting that the new venue was "... already receiving high praise from beer lovers near and far."

== Services ==
The station is served by hourly local trains in each direction, between Birmingham Snow Hill and Stratford-upon-Avon, run by West Midlands Trains. Most Birmingham trains continue to Stourbridge Junction. On Sundays, trains run to/from Worcester Foregate Street on the same hourly frequency.

Preceding station	National Rail	Following station
Danzey	West Midlands Railway; North Warwickshire Line	Wootton Wawen
	Heritage railways	
Tyseley	Vintage Trains; The Shakespeare Express; Railtours; July–September	Stratford-upon-Avon
	Disused railways	
Lapworth; Line closed, station open	Great Western Railway; Birmingham and Henley in Arden Railway	Terminus

== Accidents ==
Several accidents have taken place at both the original and present stations at Henley:

- On 4 September 1899, at the original branch line station, a passenger train with four passengers on board, was approaching the station on the descending gradient, it failed to slow down, and crashed through the buffers at the end of the station; the locomotive and first coach then came to rest in a nearby meadow. The engine crew jumped off before the accident, the four passengers were on board the other coaches and were unhurt. The driver stated that the brakes failed to operate when he applied them.
- Just after midnight on 25 June 1911, at the present station, an accident occurred when the signalman at Henley mistakenly believed that a train approaching the station was a local terminating train, and so set the points for the bay platform: in fact the train was the Wolverhampton to Bristol express. The express entered the bay at around 30 mph, despite the driver applying the emergency brakes, the train smashed through the buffers and overturned onto the up main line, demolishing a signal. The first two coaches were smashed, but were empty; nine of the 33 passengers on board were slightly injured. The driver and fireman were scalded when they returned to shut off the steam on the locomotive to prevent a boiler explosion.
