= Danzey railway station =

Railway station in Warwickshire, England

Coordinates: 52.324°N 1.821°W

Danzey
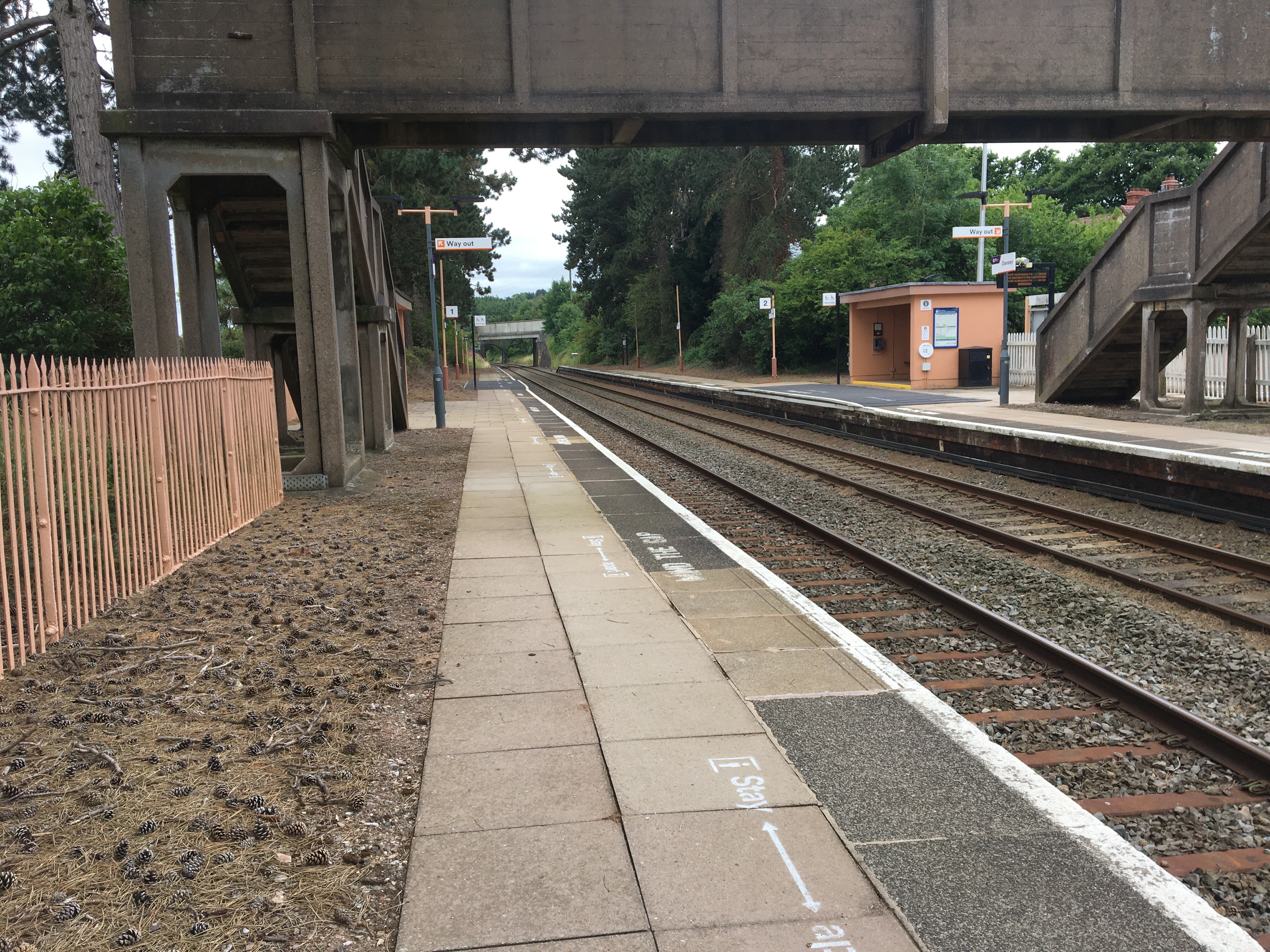
- Danzey railway station in 2020

General information
- Location: Danzey Green, Stratford-on-Avon; England
- Grid reference: SP122696
- Manager: West Midlands Trains
- Platforms: 2

Other information
- Station code: DZY
- Classification: DfT category F2

History
- Opened: 1908

Passengers
- 2021/22: ▲3,488
- 2022/23: ▲4,860
- 2023/24: ▼4,554
- 2024/25: ▲6,170
- 2025/26: ▲6,504
Location
Notes
- Passenger statistics from the Office of Rail and Road

Danzey is a railway station which serves the small village of Danzey Green, and the larger but slightly more distant village of Tanworth-in-Arden in Warwickshire, England.

Situated on the North Warwickshire Line, the station was opened by the Great Western Railway in 1908 along with the line, and was originally known as Danzey for Tanworth. It is a few minutes walk from Danzey Green, and around one mile from Tanworth-in-Arden.

== Services ==
The service in each direction between Kidderminster and Stratford via Birmingham runs hourly.

Until the May 2023 timetable change Danzey was a request stop, meaning passengers wishing to board a train here needed to signal to the driver their intent to board; those wishing to alight needing to inform the train conductor.

There is no Sunday service.

Preceding station	National Rail	Following station
Wood End	West Midlands Railway; North Warwickshire Line	Henley-in-Arden
