= West Midlands Rail Executive =

British regional rail oversight authority

West Midlands Rail Limited

- Map showing the West Midlands region, the organisation's area of responsibility
- Abbreviation: WMR
- Formation: 2017
- Type: Public body
- Location: The Midlands of England, UK
- Region served: West Midlands
- Chair of the Board of Directors: Mayor of the West Midlands Richard Parker
- Affiliations: Department for Transport
- Website: wmre.org.uk

West Midlands Rail Executive (WMRE) is a British municipally owned corporation which was formed to manage rail transport policy in the West Midlands region of England. It is jointly owned by a partnership of 16 local authorities.

It should not be confused with Transport for West Midlands (TfWM), the authority responsible for transport in the smaller West Midlands County.

== Formation ==
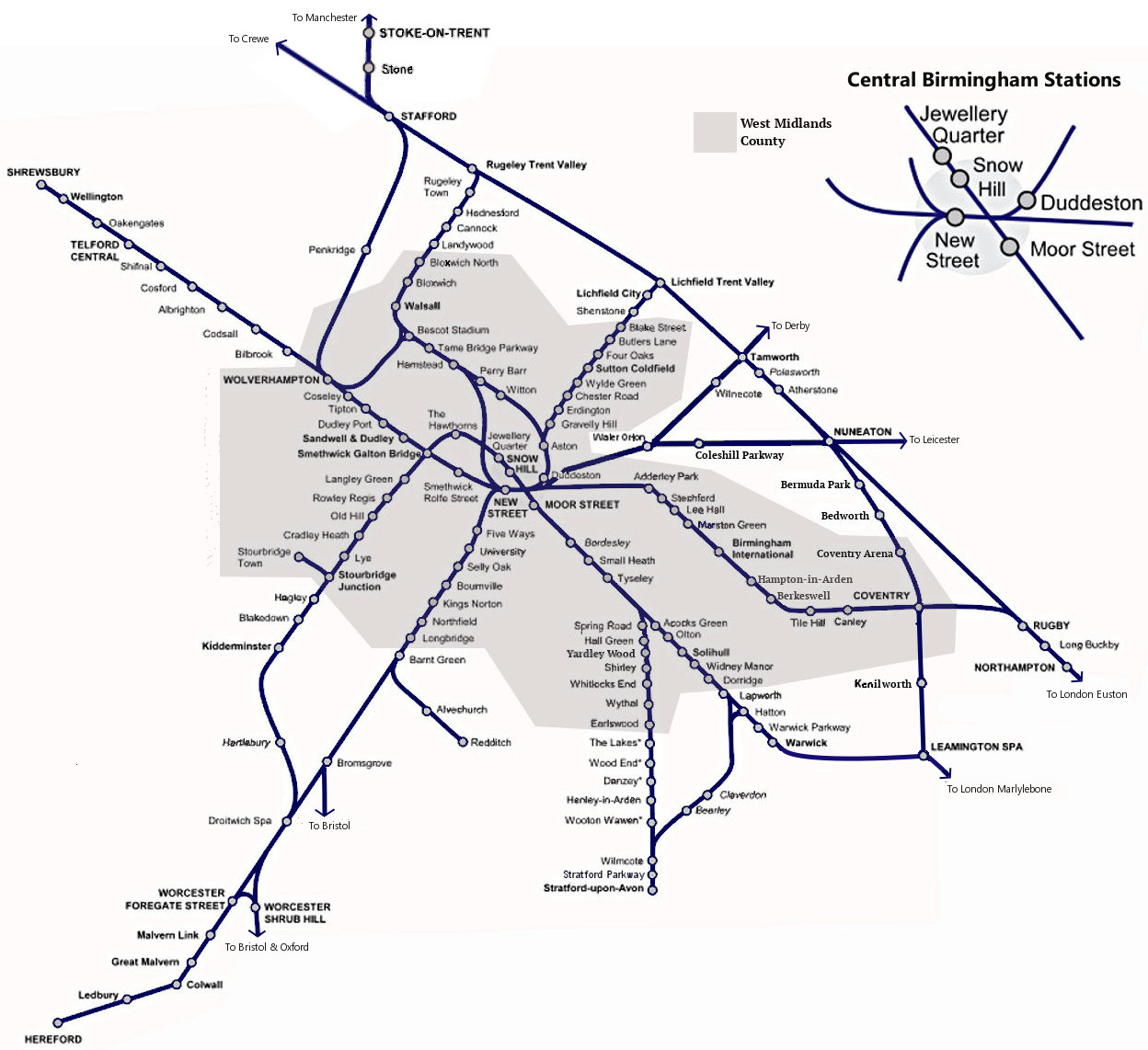
Map of the Birmingham & the West Midlands regional rail network (2017)

WMRE was established in December 2017 as West Midlands Rail, a partnership of local transport authorities. It has joint responsibility for overseeing rail services running within the region along with the Department for Transport, a central government department. In particular, it oversees the operations of the train operating company West Midlands Trains, which commenced operations on 10 December 2017. It now uses the name West Midlands Rail Executive.

Full members of the WMRE Executive Board are Birmingham City Council, Coventry City Council, Dudley Borough Council, Herefordshire Council, Northamptonshire County Council, Sandwell Council, Solihull Council, Shropshire Council, Staffordshire Council, Telford and Wrekin Council, Walsall Council, Warwickshire County Council, Wolverhampton City Council and Worcestershire County Council. Cheshire East Council and Stoke-on-Trent City Council are affiliate members.

== Branding ==
The WMRE logo consists of a hexagon formed from the letters WM and the company name in the LL Circular typeface by Lineto. This has been adopted as part of a shared branding with other transport modes in order to create a common identity for an integrated transport system for the region. Variants of the hexagonal logo are also used by West Midlands Metro, West Midlands Trains and TfWM's West Midlands Network branding on buses, taxis and roads.
