= Thameslink (train operating company, 1997–2006) =

Former British train operating company

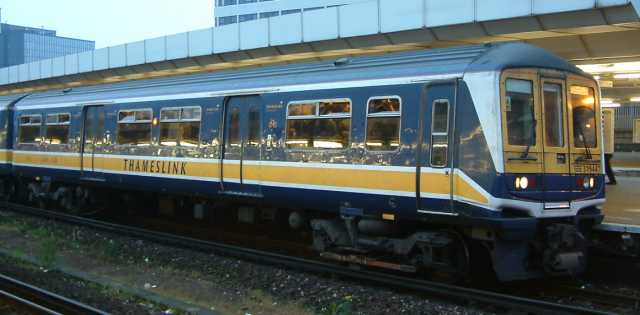

Overview
- Franchises: Thameslink; 2 March 1997 – 31 March 2006
- Main stations: Bedford, King's Cross, Brighton
- Other stations: Luton Airport, Blackfriars, London Bridge, Gatwick Airport, Wimbledon
- Fleet: 74 Class 319
- Stations called at: 56 (26 operated)
- Parent company: Govia (Go-Ahead/Keolis)
- Reporting mark: TR
- Predecessor: Network SouthEast
- Successor: First Capital Connect

Technical
- Track gauge: 1,435 mm (4 ft 8 1/2 in) standard gauge
- Electrification: 750 V DC third rail (South of Farringdon); 25 kV 50 Hz AC Overhead (North of City Thameslink)

Thameslink was a British train operating company owned by Govia that operated the Thameslink franchise between March 1997 and March 2006.

The franchise was originally due to end on 31 March 2004, however a two-year extension was awarded to Govia by the Strategic Rail Authority on 13 February 2004. In December 2005, the Department for Transport awarded the new franchise to FirstGroup; thus the services operated by Thameslink were transferred to First Capital Connect on 1 April 2006.

== Services ==
Thameslink operated passenger services from Bedford via the Thameslink route to Moorgate, Sutton, Wimbledon and Brighton.

== Rolling stock ==
Thameslink inherited a fleet of 66 Class 319s from Network SouthEast.

During 2002, Thameslink hired two Class 317s from West Anglia Great Northern for services to Moorgate. Thameslink received some extra Class 319s from Southern in 2004.

Between September 2004 and May 2005, Class 317s were hired from West Anglia Great Northern to operate Bedford to St Pancras services while the Thameslink line was severed for six months for the new St Pancras station to be built.

Class	Image	Type	Top speed		Number	Built
Class	Image	Type	mph	km/h	Number	Built
317		electric multiple unit	100	160	7	1981–1982
319		electric multiple unit	100	160	74	1987–1988, 1990

== Depots ==
Thameslink's fleet was originally maintained at Selhurst Depot under sub-contract by Connex South Central/Southern. With the Thameslink line to be severed for six months, Bedford Cauldwell depot was built in 2004. It progressively took over all work from Selhurst.

== Demise ==
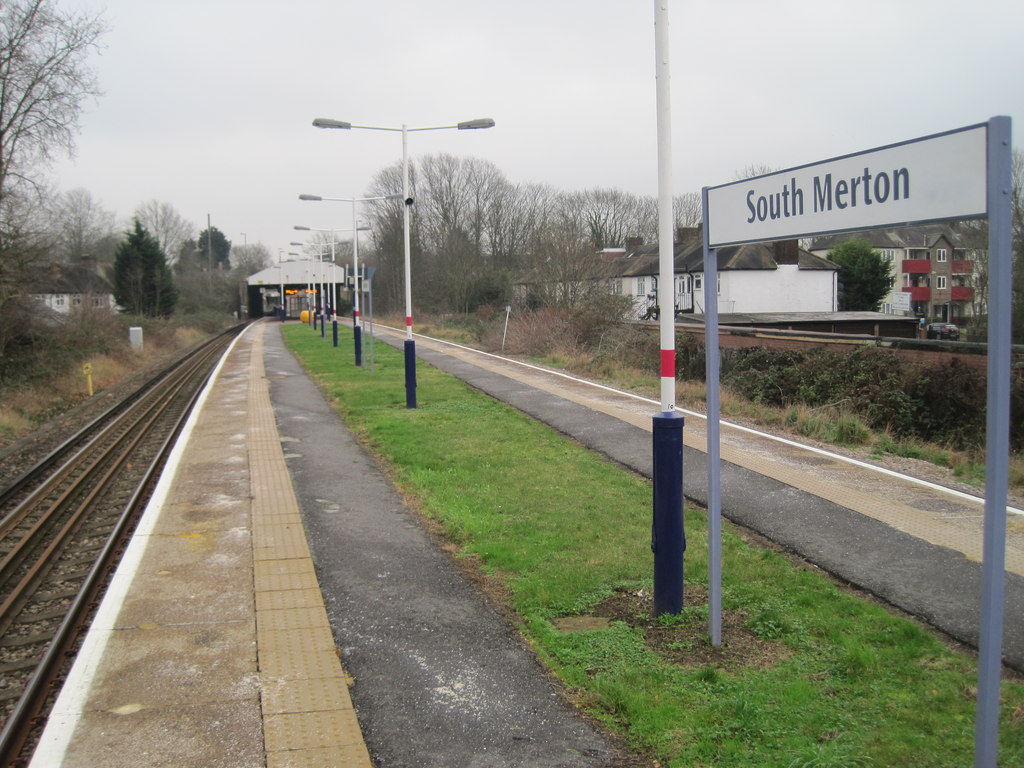
Original Thameslink signage still visible on the Sutton Loop Line as of January 2013.

In April 2005, the Strategic Rail Authority announced the parties shortlisted to bid for the new Thameslink Great Northern franchise; Govia was not shortlisted. In December 2005, the Department for Transport awarded the new franchise to FirstGroup. Accordingly, the services that were operated by Thameslink were transferred to First Capital Connect on 1 April 2006. However, it was announced in May 2014 that Govia had reclaimed the Thameslink franchise, which started on 14 September 2014, thus ending the First Capital Connect franchise. Govia operated Thameslink under Govia Thameslink Railway until 31 May 2026 when it was renationalised as Greater Thameslink Railway.

== See also ==
- Thameslink (route)

Preceded by Network SouthEast; As part of British Rail	Operator of Thameslink franchise 1997–2006	Succeeded by First Capital Connect; Thameslink and Great Northern franchise
