= British Rail Class 350 =

British electric passenger train

British Rail Class 350 Desiro
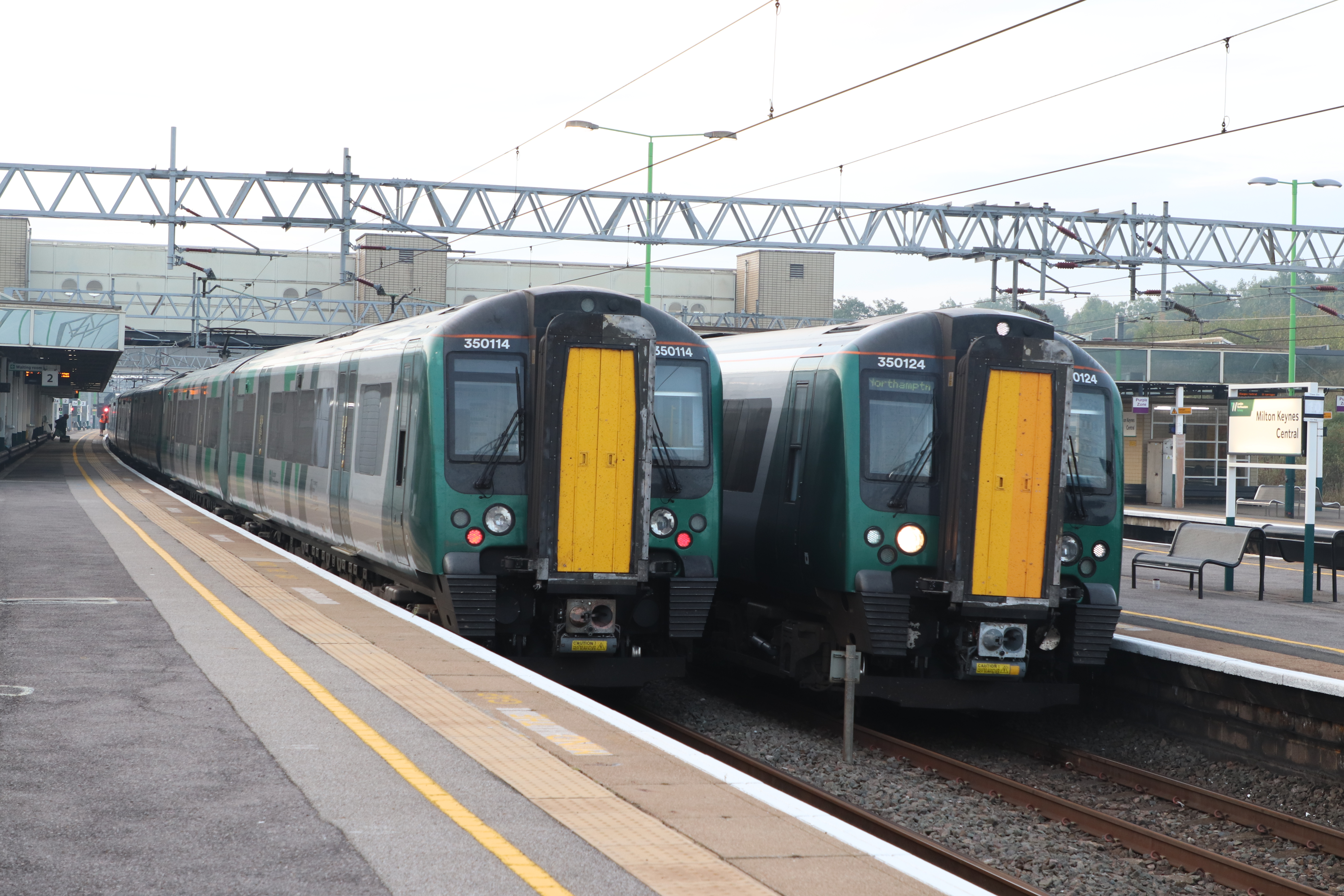
- Two London Northwestern Railway Class 350s at Milton Keynes Central

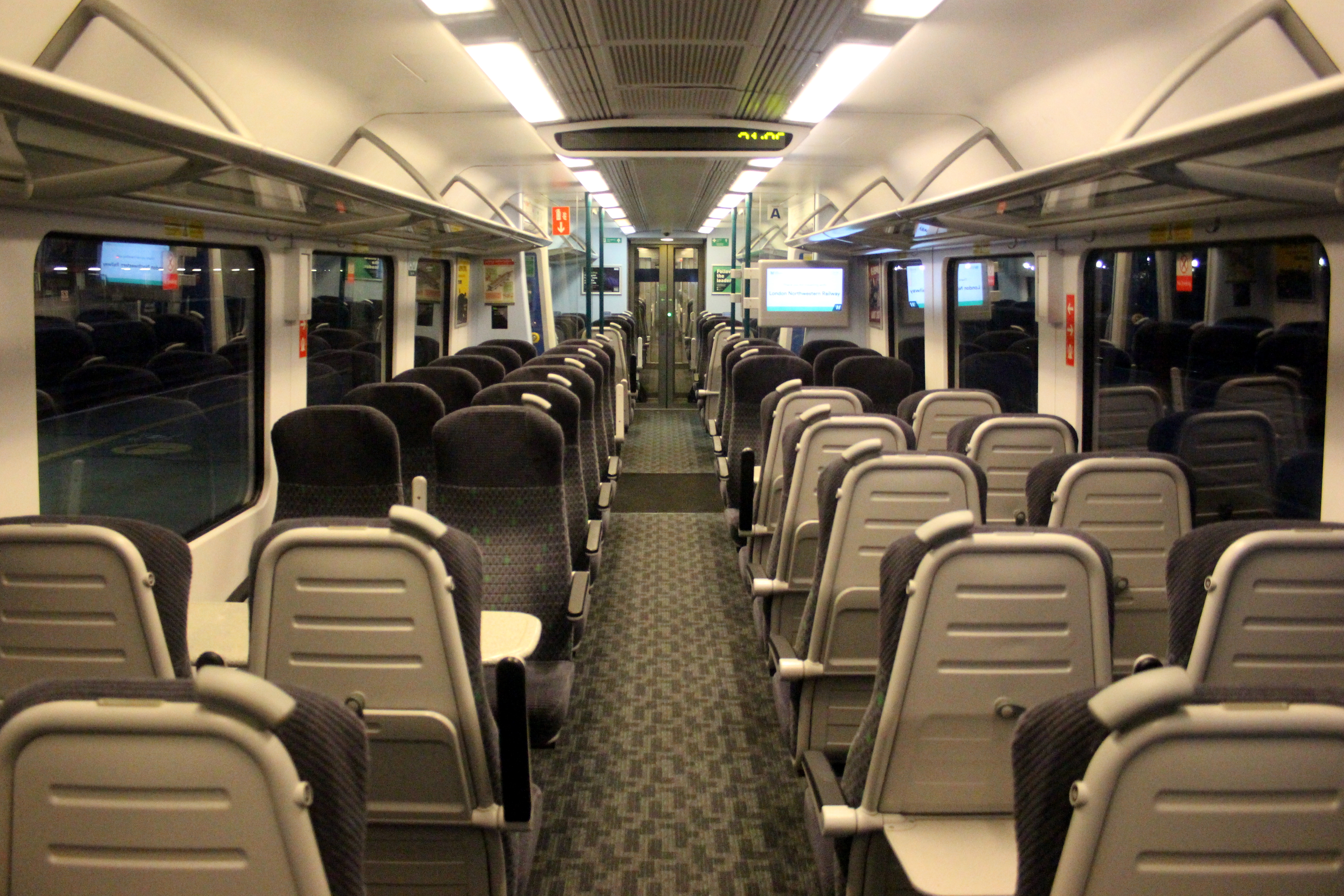
- Refurbished standard-class interior of a Class 350/1 unit
- In service: June 2005 – present
- Manufacturer: Siemens Mobility
- Built at: Vienna, Austria (Note: 350/1); Uerdingen, Germany (Note: 350/1, 350/2 DMSO and 350/2 Assembly); Praha Zlicin, Czech Republic (Note: 350/2 TCO & 350/2 PTSO); Krefeld, Germany (Note: 350/3 & 350/4)
- Family name: Desiro
- Replaced: Class 153; Class 170; Class 319; Class 321; Class 323
- Constructed: 2004–2005 (350/1); 2008–2009 (350/2); 2013–2014 (350/3 and /4)
- Refurbished: 2023- (350/3)
- Number built: 87
- Number in service: 50
- Successor: Class 397; Class 730
- Formation: 4 cars per unit
- Fleet numbers: 350101–350130; 350231–350267; 350368–350377; 350401–350410
- Capacity: First class: 24 seats; Standard class: 206–246 seats; plus 117–149 standees
- Owners: Angel Trains (350/1, 350/3, 350/4); Porterbrook (350/2)
- Operators: Current: West Midlands Trains; Future: Northern Trains
- Depots: Current: Kings Heath (Northampton); Future: Ardwick (Manchester)

Specifications
- Train length: 81.36 m (266 ft 11 in)
- Car length: 20.34 m (66 ft 9 in)
- Width: 2.80 m (9 ft 2 1/4 in)
- Doors: Bi-parting Sliding plug
- Maximum speed: 110 mph (180 km/h)
- Weight: 175 tonnes (172 long tons; 193 short tons)
- Traction system: Siemens SIBAS32 IGBT-VVVF
- Traction motors: 8 × Siemens 1TB2016-0GB02 asynchronous three-phase AC
- Power output: 250 kW (335 hp) per motor; 2,000 kW (2,680 hp) total
- Electric systems: 25 kV 50 Hz AC overhead; 750 V DC third rail (350/1 only)
- Current collection: Pantograph; Contact shoe (350/1 only)
- Bogies: Siemens SGP SF5000
- Braking systems: Disk, regenerative
- Safety systems: AWS; TPWS
- Coupling system: Dellner 12
- Multiple working: Within class
- Track gauge: 1,435 mm (4 ft 8 1/2 in) standard gauge

Notes/references
- Sourced from unless otherwise noted.

The British Rail Class 350 Desiro is a class of electric multiple unit passenger train built by Siemens Mobility to its Desiro design between 2004 and 2014. Fifty are operated by West Midlands Trains, having previously been operated by Central Trains, Silverlink, Southern, London Midland, First TransPennine Express and TransPennine Express. The remaining 37 are in storage and are scheduled to be transferred to Northern Trains between 2028 and 2030.

== Description ==
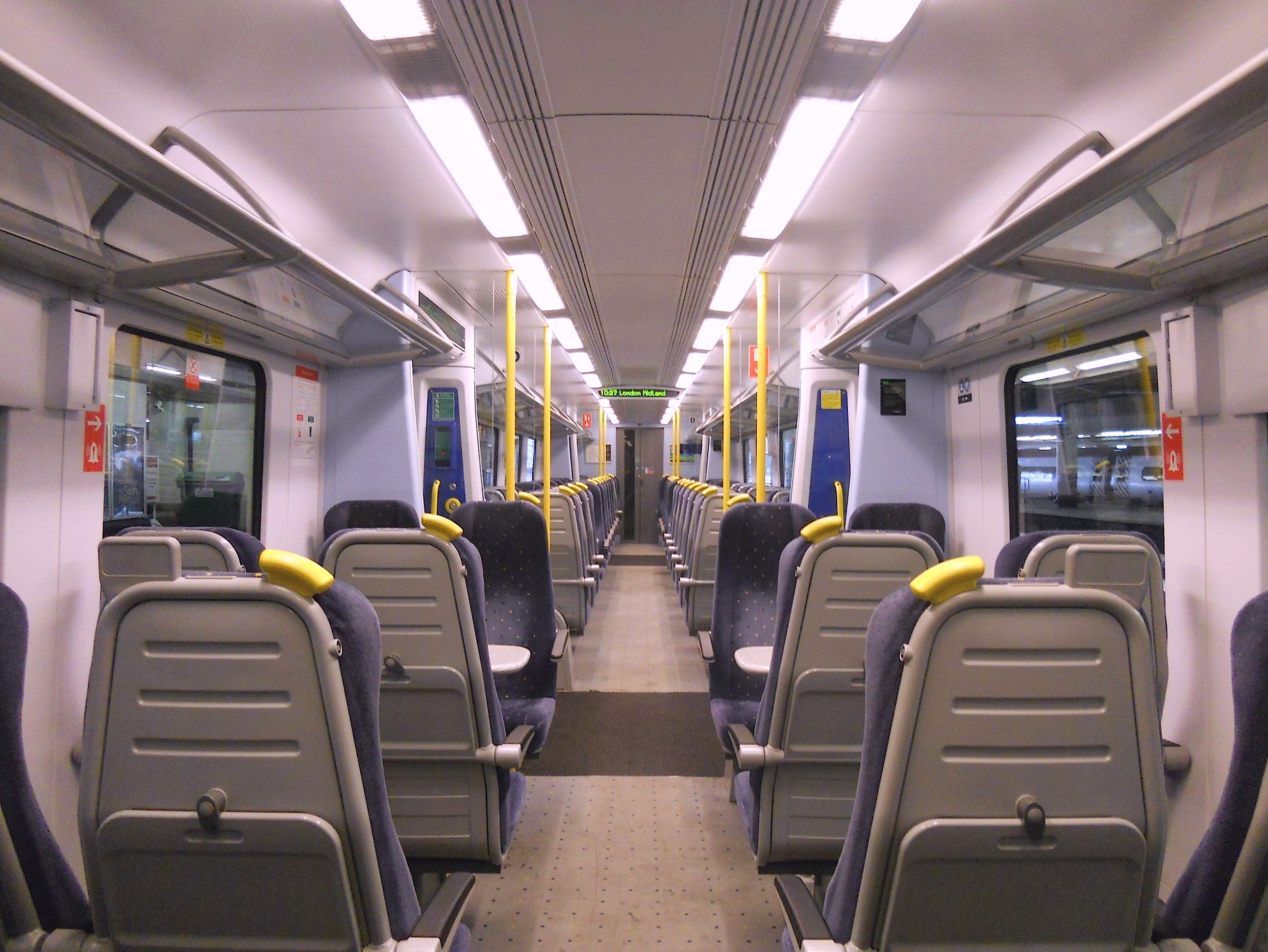
The neutral colour scheme interior of the Class 350/1

The Class 350/1 units were originally part of an order for 32 five-car Class 450 units for South West Trains. However, they were never built as such. Of the 160 carriages ordered, 40 were diverted as an additional 10 four-car Class 450 units, and the remaining 120 were modified as 30 four-car Class 350/1 units. These entered service in 2005 and were used jointly by Central Trains and Silverlink, both owned by National Express. The top speed of the fleet was originally 100 mph (160 km/h), but all 350/1s were modified to allow 110 mph (180 km/h) running from December 2012, in order to make better use of paths on the busy West Coast Main Line.

In late 2007, a second batch of 37 was ordered by London Midland to replace its Class 321s. Designated as Class 350/2 units, they entered service between 2008 and 2009. Class 350/2s differ from the Class 350/1 units in two key aspects: having 3+2 seating in standard class (because they work short-hop commuter services; the Class 350/1 used for longer distance services are 2+2 throughout and lack the dual-voltage capability of the 350/1. Initially, Class 350/2 units had a maximum speed of 100 mph (160 km/h), but the fleet was upgraded to allow 110 mph running during 2018. This was to allow the operators to run mixed 350/1 and 350/2 services without causing delays, especially important given the capacity changes which HS2 works at London Euston were expected to cause.

Between 2013 and 2014, a further 20 were manufactured for London Midland and First TransPennine Express. Each took on ten units, the former designated the Class 350/3 and the latter the Class 350/4.

Class 350 trains are nearly identical to those of Class 450. The latter class is only fitted with traction equipment for Southern Region 750 V DC third rail, whilst the Class 350/1 units can operate from either 25 kV 50 Hz AC OLE, as is done in regular service, or alternatively third rail. This dual-voltage capability was utilised when several units were leased to Southern in 2009, in order to cover for similarly equipped Class 377/2 units temporarily sub-leased to First Capital Connect. All Class 350 units built since are not equipped for third-rail use but, like most modern British EMUs, can be retrofitted if necessary.

Every set of doors has its own set of guard-operated door controls behind a lockable panel. The cabs have three radio systems - Cab Secure Radio (CSR), National Radio Network (NRN), and the newest system, GSM-R. CCTV and dot-matrix destination screens are fitted throughout the train.

== Current operation ==
=== West Midlands Trains ===
All 77 of London Midland's Class 350s (30 350/1s, 37 350/2s and 10 350/3s) were inherited by West Midlands Trains on 9 December 2017.

Then, in 2019-20, the 10 Class 350/4s were transferred from TransPennine Express, meaning that West Midlands Trains then operated all 87 350s built (30 350/1s, 37 350/2s, 10 350/3s and 10 350/4s).

However, in October 2024, the 37 Class 350/2s started to be sent off lease, with the last of those units withdrawn from service in December 2025, reducing the number of 350s in service to 50 units currently operated (30 350/1s, 10 350/3s and 10 350/4s).

WMT operates its remaining units primarily under its London Northwestern Railway brand, however some units also run routes under the West Midlands Railway brand on the Chase Line.

The fleet is based at the purpose-built Kings Heath depot at Kingsthorpe, which opened in June 2006. In May 2021, they took over services on the Abbey line from Class 319s.

== Former operations ==
=== Central Trains / Silverlink ===
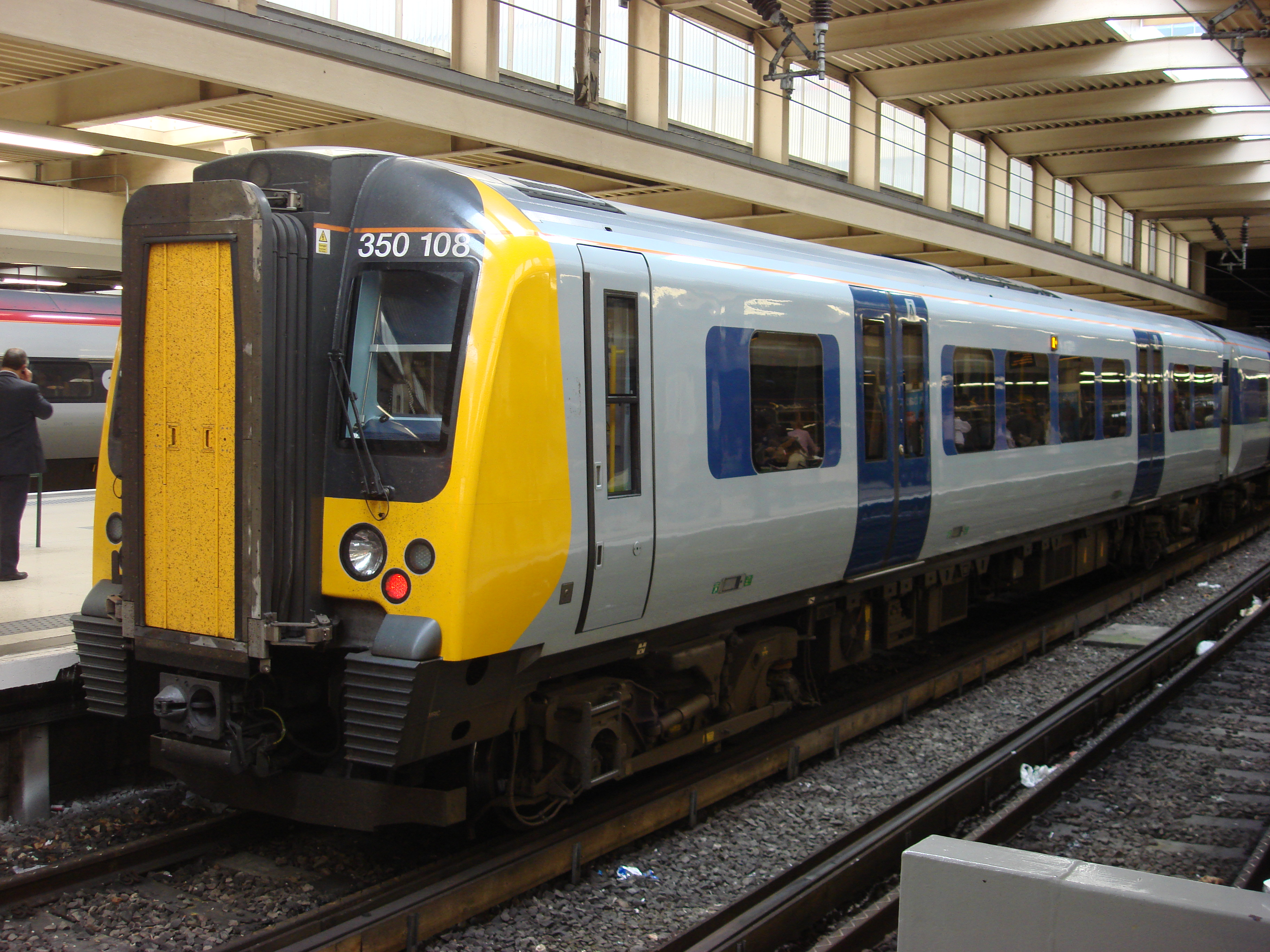
Class 350 at London Euston. The first order of Class 350 units were delivered in a neutral grey and blue livery, as they were operated by both Central Trains and Silverlink.

Central Trains and Silverlink shared the 30 Class 350/1 units from 2005 to 2007. They were operated as a common user fleet in a neutral grey and blue livery.

They first entered service in June 2005 with Central Trains. These operated on services between Birmingham and Northampton via Coventry, and all Birmingham - Liverpool services, replacing Class 170s. Later on, the units also took over some peak services between Birmingham and Walsall.

Silverlink began operating the fleet in June 2005 between London Euston, Milton Keynes Central and Northampton.

The Central Trains and Silverlink franchises expired in November 2007.

=== London Midland ===
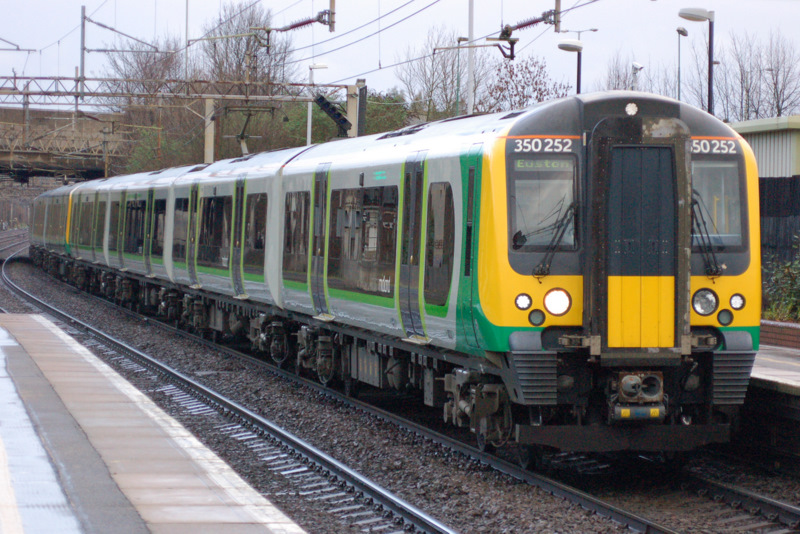
London Midland Class 350 arrives at Watford Junction

Once the Central Trains and Silverlink franchises expired, the entire Class 350 fleet transferred to London Midland with the West Midlands franchise.

As part of the franchise agreement, London Midland ordered 37 additional Class 350s. On 8 October 2008, the first of these was handed over to Porterbrook and carried invited guests around the Wildenrath Test Track. The first ten 350/2 units entered service in December 2008 and the final unit was officially delivered to London Midland on 30 July 2009. In addition to the existing operations, these units took over the new Crewe - London Euston service running via Stoke-on-Trent and stopping at most of the Trent Valley line stations.

Several Class 350/1 units were subleased to Southern in 2009, to provide cover for Class 377/2 units subleased to First Capital Connect, themselves to cover for delays in the construction of the Class 377/5 fleet. All were returned within the year.

A further 10 four-car units were built later on in the franchise to provide additional capacity, entering service from October 2014 as Class 350/3s.

=== First TransPennine Express / TransPennine Express ===
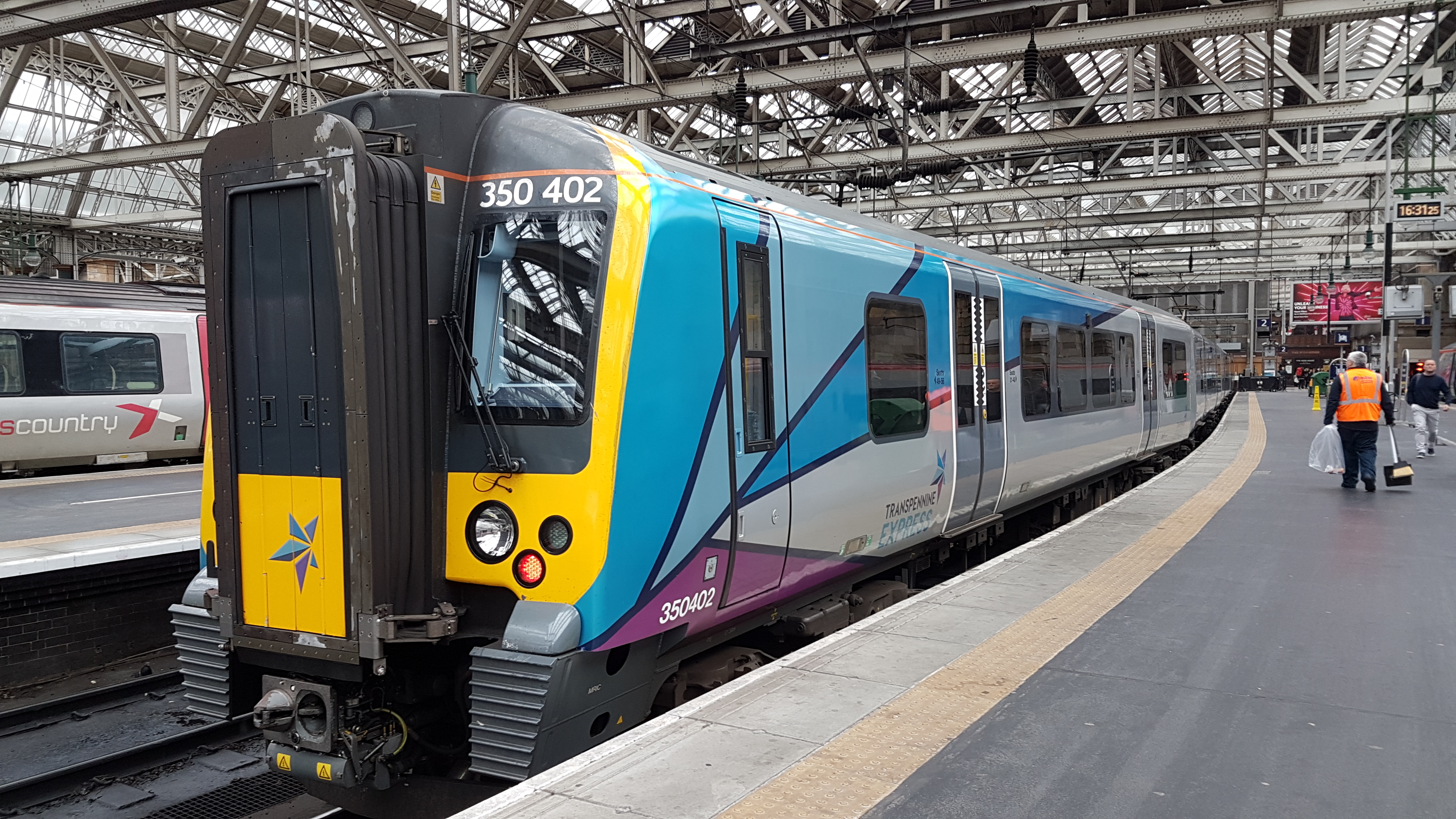
TransPennine Express Class 350 at Glasgow Central

In 2013, ten Class 350/4 units were introduced for First TransPennine Express services between Manchester and Edinburgh / Glasgow, coinciding with the completion of the electrification of the eastern section of the Manchester to Liverpool via Newton-le-Willows line. The first First TransPennine Express Class 350/4 services ran on 30 December 2013 between Manchester Piccadilly and Glasgow Central. The introduction of these units allowed most services on the Manchester to Scotland route to be operated using EMUs, displacing the Class 185s which were cascaded to other routes to enhance capacity. The units were based at Siemens' existing Ardwick depot in Manchester, with the government providing funding for the required electrification.

Following the transfer of the franchise to TransPennine Express (itself still a FirstGroup company) in 2016, 12 Class 397 Civity units were ordered to replace the Class 350s on TransPennine North West services. All ten moved to West Midlands Trains, in 2019 and 2020.

== Future operation ==
In August 2025 a Class 350/2 was used on the Glossop Line as part of a trial to test the trains for possible use on services in the North of England.

On 10 July 2026 it was announced that Northern Trains are to lease the 350/2 fleet, in order to replace its Class 323 fleet.

== Past proposals ==
In October 2018, Porterbrook, which owns the Class 350/2 units, announced that it was considering to convert them into battery electric multiple units for potential future cascades to non-electrified routes.

== Fleet details ==
The Class 350/1s, 350/3s and 350/4s are owned by Angel Trains, and the Class 350/2s are owned by Porterbrook.

| Class | Operator | No. Built | Year built | Unit nos. | Standard class seating | Notes |
|---|---|---|---|---|---|---|
| 350/1 | West Midlands Trains | 30 | 2004–2005 | 350101–350130 | 2+2 | Dual voltage |
| 350/2 | Stored | 37 | 2008–2009 | 350231–350267 | 3+2 | |
| 350/3 | West Midlands Trains | 10 | 2014 | 350368–350377 | 2+2 | |
| 350/4 | West Midlands Trains | 10 | 2013–2014 | 350401–350410 | 2+2 | |

=== Named units and special liveries ===
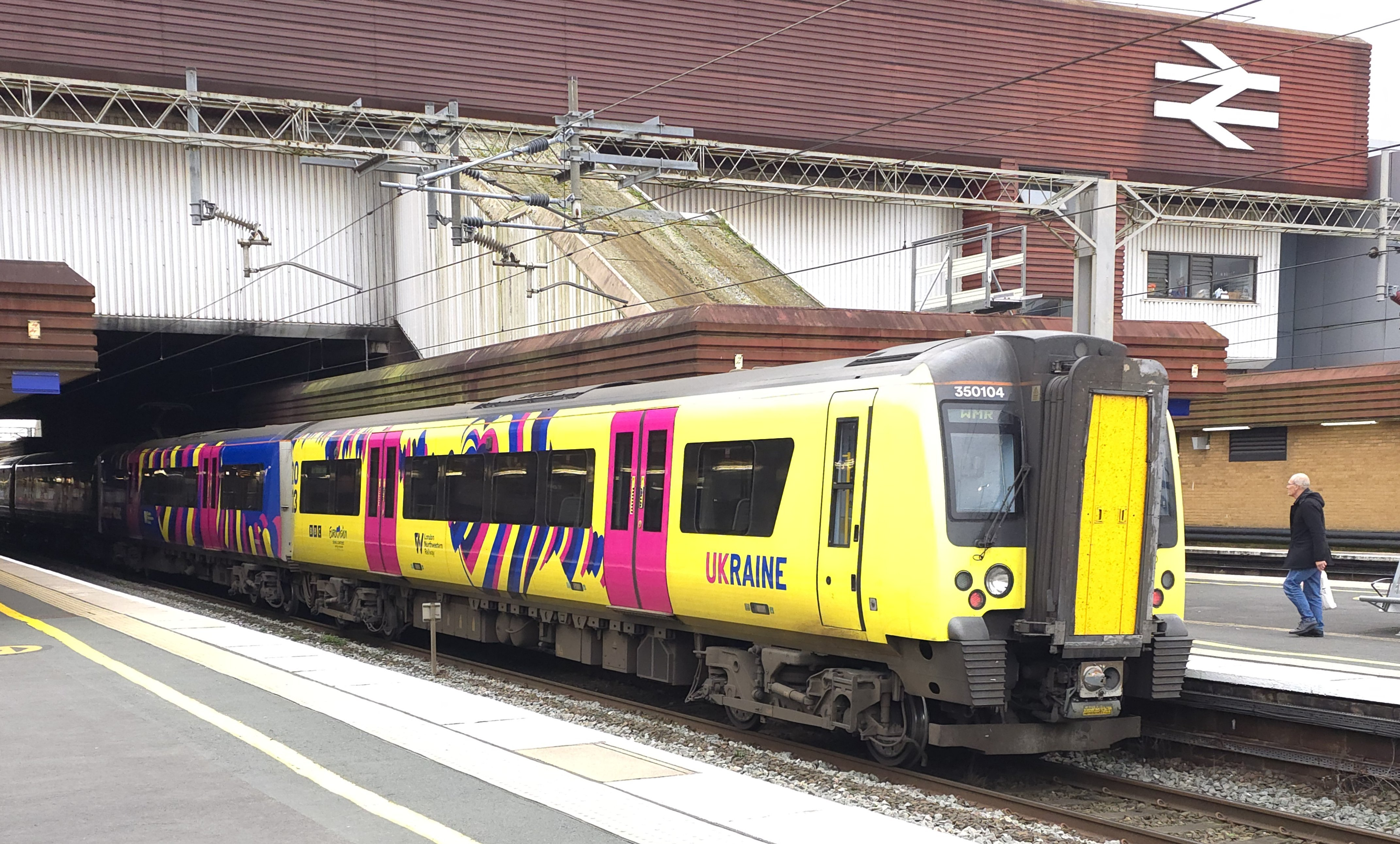
West Midlands Trains Class 350 in Eurovision 2023 livery at Birmingham International

- 350111 - Spirt of Invictus (formerly Apollo)
- 350115 - Archimedes (de-named)
- 350232 - Chad Varah (de-named)
- 350370 - Lichfield Festival (de-named)
- 350375 - Vic Hall
- 350377 - Graham Taylor OBE

In May 2023, unit 350104 was decorated with special Eurovision Song Contest 2023 livery.

In July 2026 unit 350111 was decorated with an Invictus Games livery.

== Accidents and incidents ==
In 2005, units 350105 and 350108 were damaged after colliding with a falling tree. Both were returned to Germany for repairs.

On 11 April 2011, a fire broke out in a toilet cubicle on unit 350232, following an explosion, while working the 16:25 from Northampton to London Euston, as it approached Leighton Buzzard, resulting in the death of the female occupant of the toilet. Her death turned out to be suicide, as she carried a can of petrol into the toilet and locked the door. All other passengers and the train crew escaped unharmed.

On 16 September 2016, unit 350264 struck a landslide at the entrance to Watford Tunnel and derailed. It was then hit by unit 350233 travelling in the opposite direction. Two people were injured and unit 350264 was severely damaged. The leading carriage of unit 350233 was severely damaged, and all four carriages were damaged along one side. The consequences were not as serious as they could potentially have been because the derailed train was fortuitously kept from diverging too far from its line by equipment on the bottom of the train catching on the rail, meaning unit 350233 struck only a glancing blow. On 10 November 2016, unit 350264 was moved to Germany by low-loader, followed later by 350233. Both re-entered service in early 2018.

On 26 June 2025, unit 350247 coupled with 350370 derailed at Denbigh Hall South Junction just north of Bletchley while running an empty stock movement. None of the four crew members on board were injured.
