= British Rail Class 377 =

Fleet of electric multiple units in Britain

British Rail Class 377 Electrostar
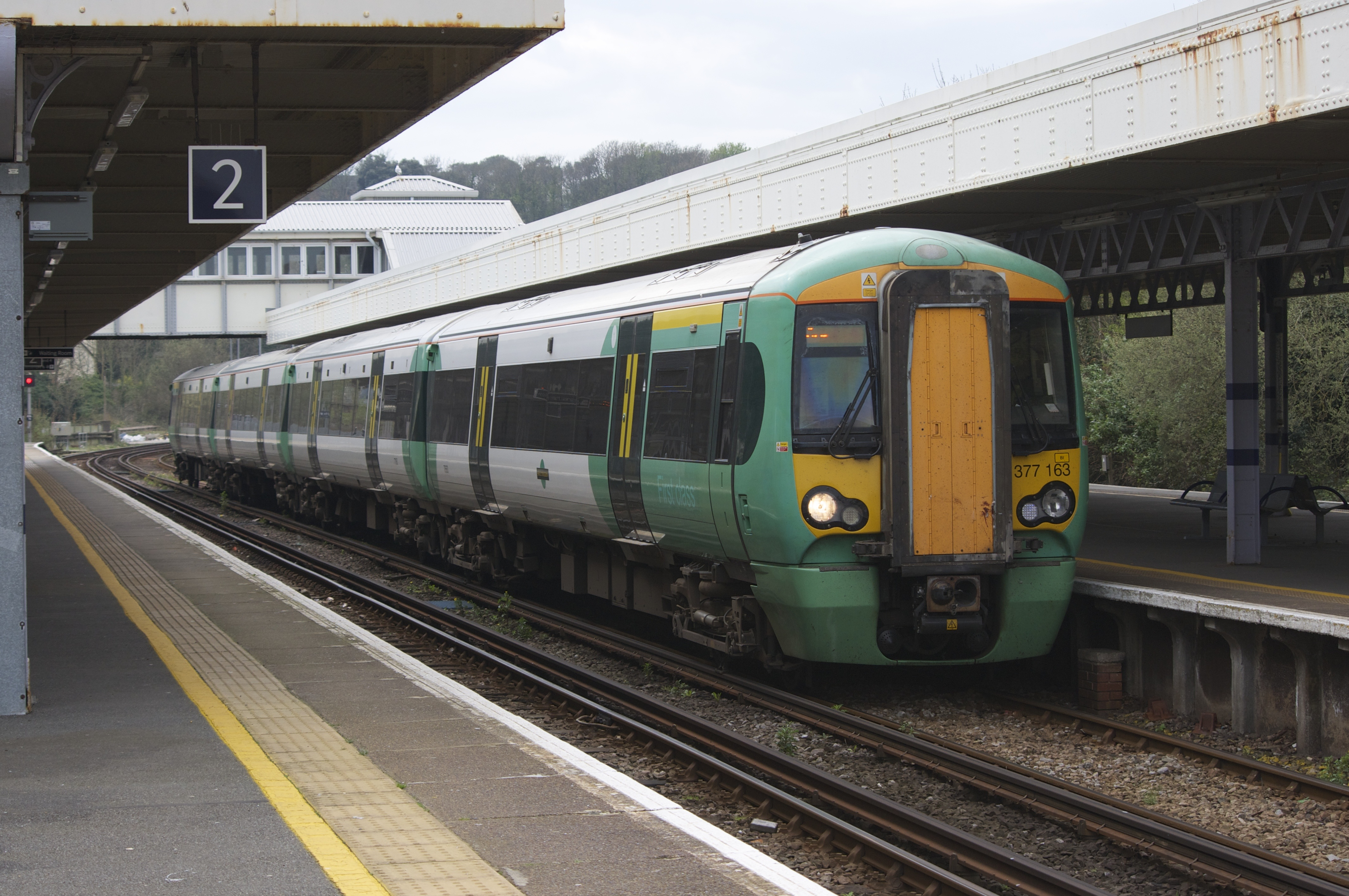
- A Southern Class 377 at Hastings

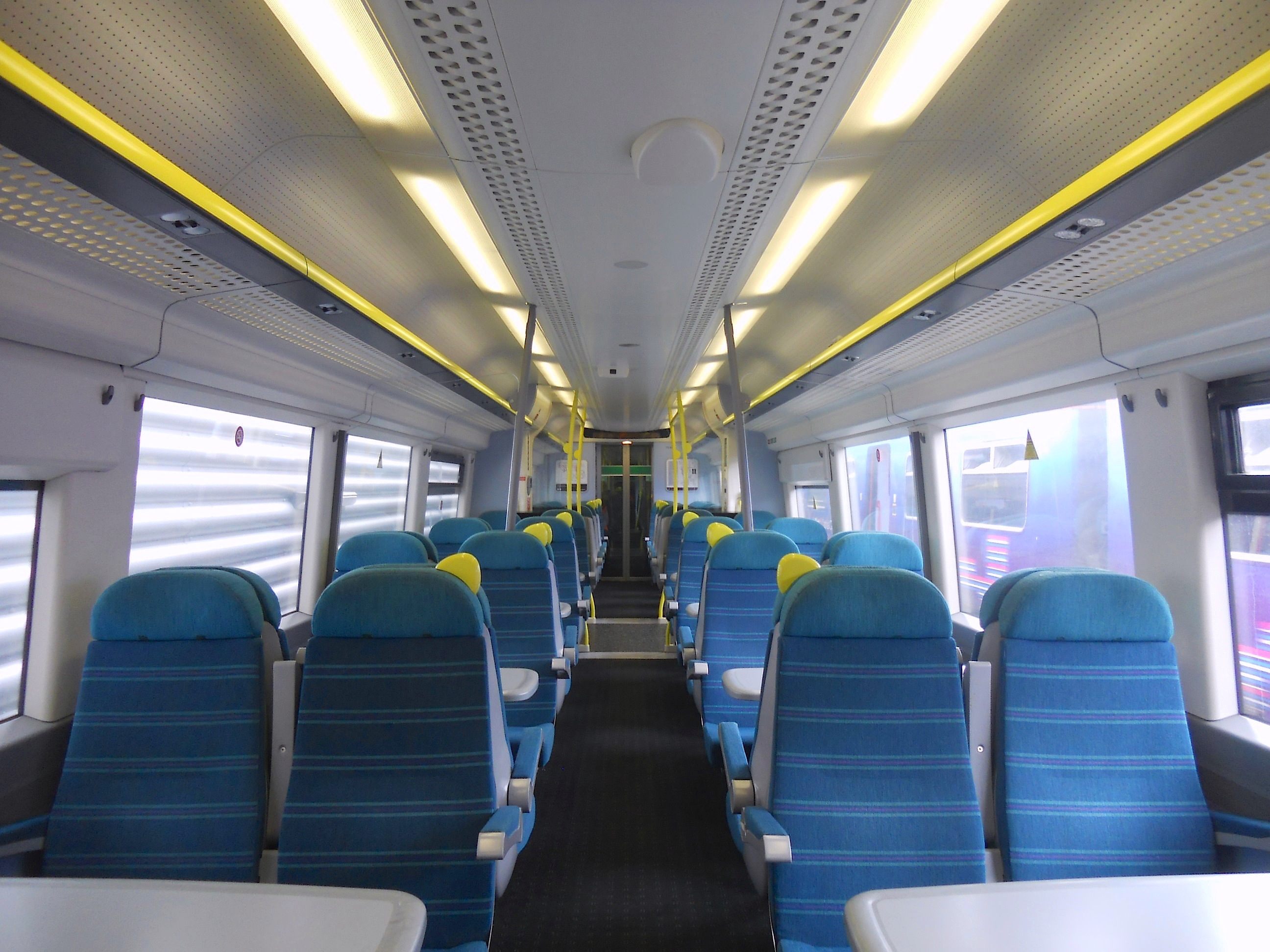
- The interior of a Southern Class 377/4
- In service: May 2003 – present
- Manufacturer: Bombardier Transportation
- Built at: Derby Litchurch Lane Works
- Family name: Electrostar
- Replaced: Class 319; Class 421; Class 423; Class 455; Class 456; Class 313
- Number built: 211 units (excluding 28 375/3 conversions)
- Successor: Class 700 (Thameslink)
- Formation: 377/1/2/4/5: 4 cars per unit (DMOS-MOSL-PTOSL-DMOS); 377/3: 3 cars per unit (DMOS-PTOSL-DMOS); 377/6/7: 5 cars per unit (DMOS-MOSL-PTOSL-MOS(2)-DMOS)
- Owner: Porterbrook
- Operators: Southern; Southeastern

Specifications
- Car length: 20.4 m (66 ft 11 1/8 in)
- Width: 2.80 m (9 ft 2 1/4 in)
- Height: 3.78 m (12 ft 4 7/8 in)
- Maximum speed: 100 mph (161 km/h)
- Weight: 173.6 t (170.9 long tons; 191.4 short tons) (377/1, /2, /4, /5); 133.1 t (131.0 long tons; 146.7 short tons) (377/3 only)
- Traction motors: 4–8 × 200 kW (270 hp)
- Power output: 1,200 kW (1,600 hp) (377/1, /2, /4, /5); 800 kW (1,100 hp) (377/3 only); 1,400 kW (1,900 hp) (377/6 and /7)
- Electric systems: 750 V DC 3rd rail; 25 kV 50 Hz AC Overhead lines (377/2, 377/5 and 377/7 only)
- Current collection: Contact shoe; Brecknell Willis pantograph (377/2, 377/5 and 377/7 only)
- Coupling system: Dellner
- Multiple working: Within class, Class 378 and Class 379
- Track gauge: 1,435 mm (4 ft 8 1/2 in) standard gauge

The British Rail Class 377 Electrostar is a British dual-voltage electric multiple unit passenger train (EMU) built by Bombardier Transportation on its Electrostar platform at Derby Litchurch Lane Works from 2001 to 2014.

The trains work suburban services in South London, and main-line commuter services to Sussex, Surrey, Kent and the South Coast, on which they replaced Class 421 and Class 423 slam-door stock that was more than 40 years old and did not meet modern health and safety requirements. Built in the early 2000s, the units had a troubled introduction: being fully air-conditioned, their higher power consumption compared to the trains they replaced led to major upgrades being required to the 750 V DC third-rail power supply used in the former Southern region. The collapse of Railtrack following the Hatfield rail crash further delayed this upgrade work, and the new stock did not enter squadron service until 2003.

== Design ==
Class 377s are fitted with external CCTV. There is an open area for wheelchairs, prams and cycles, and both intermediate coaches have toilets. Bodyside power doors are electrically operated, a move away from the air-powered systems of previous generation EMUs. Dual-voltage units are fitted with a Brecknell Willis high-speed pantograph, incorporating a pair of aerofoils on the pan knuckle to steady the pan head against the OLE contact wire. The configuration of a 5-car Class 377 unit is:

- DMOC(A) – 2 motors on inner bogie, sander, auxiliary converter module
- MOSL – 2 motors on inner bogie, standard toilet (not found on 377/3s)
- PTSOL – pantograph, transformer, compressor, universal-access toilet
- MOS – 2 motors on inner bogie, standard-class interior (only found on Class 377/6 and 377/7 units)
- DMOS(B) – 2 motors on inner bogie, sander, auxiliary converter module

In the 4-car units the driving cars are composite. The first-class saloon is between the driving cab and the first set of passenger doors. 4-car units also do not contain the MOS coach.

=== Couplers ===
The Class 377 use Dellner instead of Tightlock couplings originally used on the Class 375s. Southern's 375s were all reclassified to Class 377/3s upon conversion. These reclassified units can still be identified by their 3-car formation. Note that Southeastern's 375s (sub-classes 375/3, 375/6, and 375/7) were also later converted from Tightlock to Dellner couplers but were not reclassified. Its sub-class 375/8 and 375/9 units were fitted with Dellner couplers, as built.

=== Traction current supply ===
All units can receive power via third-rail pick-up which provides 750 V DC. There are eight pick-up shoes per unit (twice the number of previous generation 4-car electric multiple units), and this enables them to ride smoothly over most third-rail gaps. The units in the 377/2, 377/5 and 377/7 sub-classes are dual-voltage, and are fitted with a pantograph to pick up 25 kV AC from overhead lines. On these units (and on single-voltage sub-class 377/6), the shoe mechanism is air-operated so that when powered down, or working on AC overhead lines, the shoe is raised out of the way. This is used on trains from Watford Junction to Clapham Junction, which use part of the West Coast Main Line between Watford Junction and Willesden Junction, and then the West London Line towards Clapham Junction. These trains change to third-rail DC supply on a dual-voltage section of the West London line north of Shepherd's Bush. Since March 2009, dual-voltage Class 377 units operated some Thameslink Bedford to Brighton, Rochester and Ashford services (see below). The Bedford to Brighton services are now run by Class 700s, while the Class 377/5s themselves are now operated by Southeastern.

Among the remaining units, the trailer coach in each unit has a recess in its roof where a pantograph could be fitted, to allow for future conversion to overhead AC power.

== Current operations ==
=== Southern ===
- Mainline and Redhill Routes: London Victoria and London Bridge to Brighton, Reigate, Tonbridge, Eastbourne, Ore, Portsmouth, Littlehampton and Bognor Regis
- East Coastway: Brighton to Seaford, Eastbourne, Hastings and Ore
- West Coastway: Brighton to Portsmouth, Littlehampton, Bognor Regis and Southampton
- West London Route: Clapham Junction to Watford Junction
- Oxted Line: London Victoria to East Grinstead
- Outer Suburban services: London Victoria and London Bridge to Tattenham Corner, Epsom, Horsham and Dorking
- Inner Suburban services: London Victoria and London Bridge to Caterham, Sutton, Epsom Downs, West Croydon and Beckenham Junction via Crystal Palace

=== Southeastern ===
In December 2016 Southeastern (Govia) received 8 units (377501-377508), transferred from Thameslink. In September 2017 these were joined by an additional 17 units (377509-523 & 377163/164)

Southeastern has received 13 Class 377/1s (377121-133) from Southern to replace ageing Class 465 units, with 377121 and 377122 in passenger service since 2 January 2025.

== Additional units and the Thameslink Programme ==
In April 2007, as part of the Route Utilisation Strategy for the Brighton Main Line, it was announced that Southern would procure an additional 48 Class 377 carriages to replace an identical number of Class 319 carriages (12 x 4-car units) due to be transferred to First Capital Connect. Eleven further dual-voltage units were then added to the order, making a total of 23. The units were commissioned at Southern's Selhurst depot in Croydon before being transferred to First Capital Connect's Bedford Cauldwell depot. The first of these, unit 377501, was delivered to Cauldwell depot on 27 February 2009 after making its first appearance through the Thameslink Central London core. The 377/5s operated mainly on Bedford to Brighton services but in the peaks formed part of First Capital Connect's and Southeastern's joint service to places such as Rochester and Ashford.

Delays in the construction of the Class 377/5s for First Capital Connect saw the temporary transfer of eight of Southern's Class 377/2s to FCC to enable it to implement the planned timetable changes on 22 March 2009. The loss of these units until September 2009 was covered by the temporary cascade of a number of Class 350/1s to Southern from London Midland, which operated services between East Croydon and Milton Keynes.

In September 2011, it was announced that Southern had begun the procurement of 130 vehicles, due to delays in the procurement of new Thameslink rolling stock that would prevent transfer of the 377/5s in time for the December 2013 timetable change. The contract was awarded to Bombardier in December 2011. The additional eight five-car units (from an option in the contract for 40 additional vehicles) are dual-voltage and known as Class 377/7.

In December 2011, three Class 377/2 units were transferred from Southern to First Capital Connect to allow more 12-car services to operate.

During mid-2013, the first of the new Class 377/6s arrived from Derby for type testing, and since October 2013, these units have been used in passenger service, initially in peak-hour services on the Sutton and Mole Valley lines, Epsom Downs Branch, Tattenham Corner Line and the Caterham Line.

Southeastern received 25 Class 377 units (the 23 Class 377/5s and 2 Class 377/1s) in recent years, as specified in Department for Transport documents, published in September 2013, relating to the new combined Thameslink, Southern and Great Northern Franchise.

== Refurbishment ==
Porterbrook is funding the £55 million five-year Project Aurora programme to refurbish 214 Class 377 Electrostars operated on Southern services. The work started in 2020 and is being done at Selhurst depot. 377 430 was the first unit to be completed in early 2021. Changes include the installation of screens showing live GTR and London Underground service information, the provision of USB and power points, energy-saving LED lighting and a passenger-counting system which will enable GTR to analyse how busy individual services are.

== Aborted proposals ==
=== Great Northern ===
In 2016, 19 of the 23 Class 377/5 units were planned to be transferred to Great Northern, for use on non-stop London-Cambridge services. However, the 29 former Thameslink Class 387/1s were transferred, instead. The Class 377/5s were later transferred to Southeastern, as part of their requirement for additional capacity.

== Fleet details ==
Class	Operator	Qty.	Year(s) built	Cars per unit	Notes	Ref.
377/1	Southern	51	2002–03	4	All third-rail routes. 377163 and 377164 transferred from Southeastern to Southern on 15 May 2022, following the retirement of the Class 455s.	
377/1	Southeastern	13	2002–03	4	Transferred from Southern	
377/2	Southern	15	2003–04	4	Dual-voltage units. These are used on Metro routes in South London and occasionally main line workings to the South Coast.	
377/3	Southern	28	2001–02	3	3-car units converted from Class 375 Nos. 375311-338 by having their Tightlock couplers replaced by Dellners. Originally used on Coastway services but later moved to London suburban services, being partly replaced by Class 313s, although many have now returned to Coastway workings following the retirement of Class 313s.	
377/4	Southern	75	2004–05	4	All third-rail routes. 377442 returned back to /4 status Mid July 2021 after spending years as a 377/3.	
377/5	Southeastern	23	2008–09	4	Dual-voltage units. All units were transferred from Thameslink to Southeastern during 2016–17 to bolster their existing Class 375 fleet.	
377/6	Southern	26	2012–13	5	Used on London suburban routes, extending as far as Dorking and Horsham, as well as Tattenham Corner/Caterham services, splitting and attaching at Purley. Run to Brighton at weekends. Also used on the East/West Coastway during events such as the Eastbourne Airshow.	
377/7	Southern	8	2014	5	Dual-voltage units. Used on the East Croydon – Watford Junction services, and metro duties shared with the 377/6s. The 8 sets were built as 5 car units with dual voltage configuration, costing circa £60 million in total, and they were delivered during 2014 for service entry in December of that year.	

=== Illustrations ===
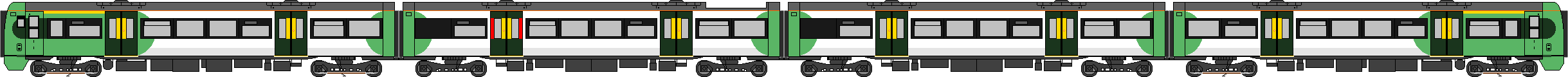
Illustration of a Southern Class 377/1/4 unit
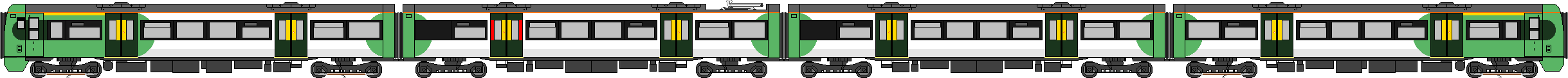
Illustration of a Southern Class 377/2 unit
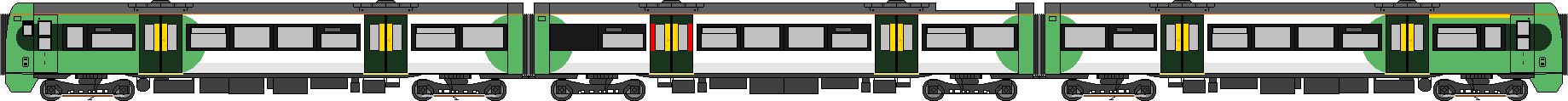
Illustration of a Southern Class 377/3 unit
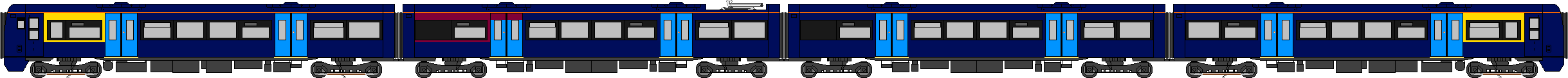
Illustration of a Southeastern Class 377/5 unit
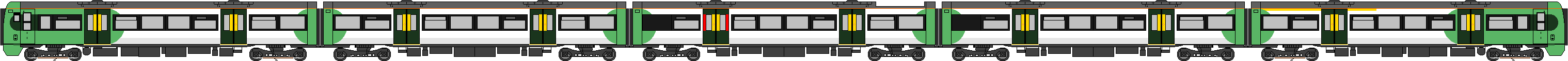
Illustration of a Southern Class 377/6 unit
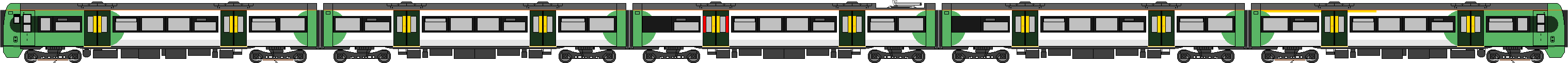
Illustration of a Southern Class 377/7 unit

== Accidents and incidents ==
On 28 November 2016, a fire broke out in the MOSL car of 377442 at Eastbourne station, causing damage to the ceiling and interior. The cause was later identified to be faulty wiring within a hand dryer located in the toilet.

On 17 February 2018, 377454 hit a car on a level crossing at Barns Green near Horsham. The two occupants of the car died at the scene.

On 8 May 2019, 377142 collided with the buffer stop at London Victoria station.

On 13 December 2024, unit 377426 collided with the buffer stops at London Bridge station. The cause was driver error.
