= Northampton Kings Heath Siemens Depot =

Railway maintenance depot in Northampton, Northamptonshire

- Interactive map of Northampton Kings Heath Siemens Depot

Location
- Location: Northampton, Northamptonshire
- Coordinates: 52.2448°N 0.9089°W
- OS grid: SP745612

Characteristics
- Owner: Siemens
- Depot code: NN
- Type: EMU

History
- Opened: June 2006

Northampton Kings Heath Siemens Depot is an Electric Traction Depot located in Northampton, Northamptonshire, England. The depot is situated on the Northampton Loop Line and is north of Northampton station.

== Allocation ==
As of 2024, the depot's allocation consists of Class 350 Desiros.
