= Cauldwell, Bedford =

Area of Bedford, England

Coordinates: 52.12393°N 0.46726°W

Cauldwell
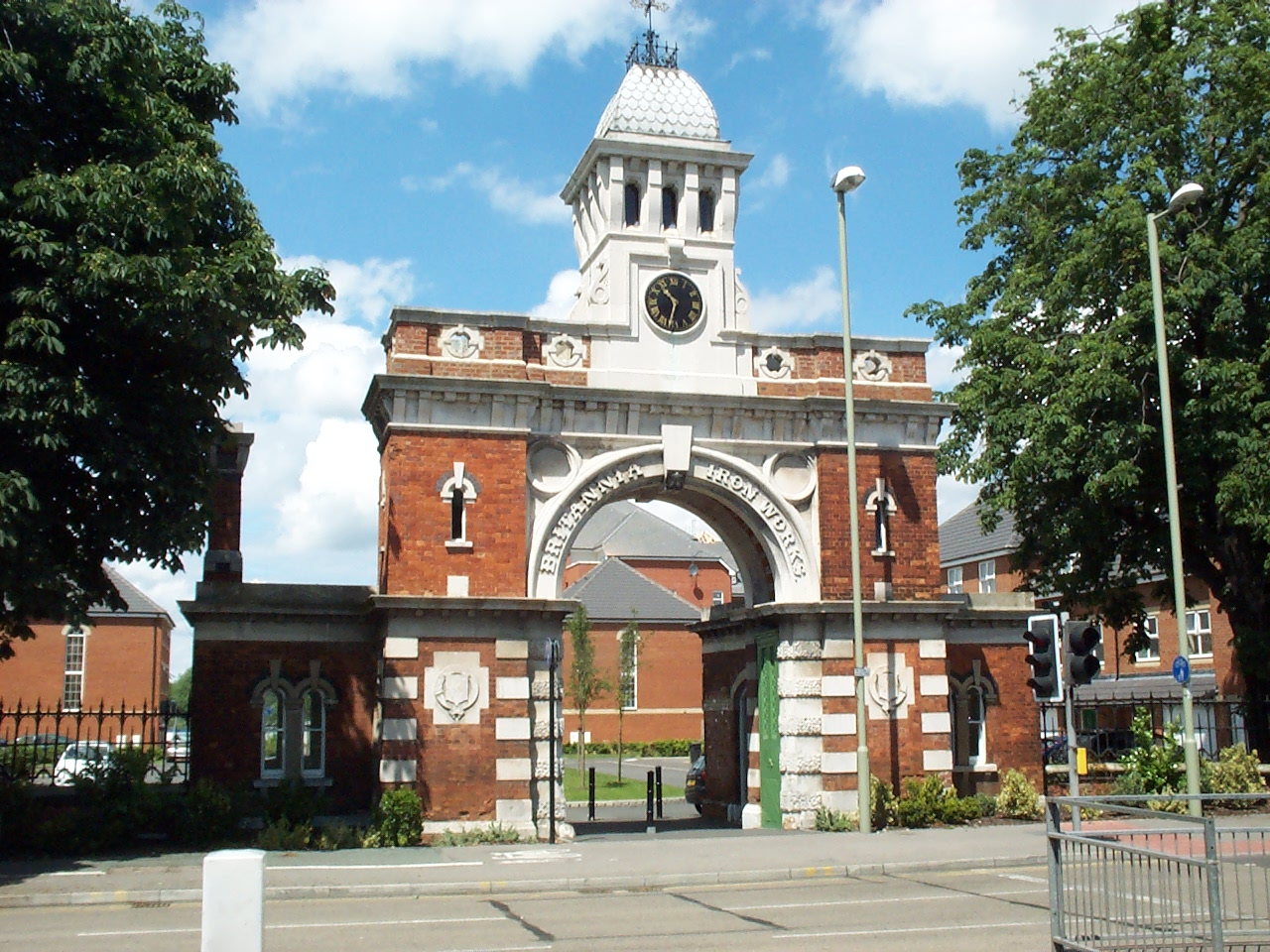
- Britannia Iron Works Gate in Cauldwell

- Location within Bedfordshire
- Population: 8,656; 9,681 (2011 Census.Ward)
- OS grid reference: TL050483
- Unitary authority: Bedford
- Ceremonial county: Bedfordshire
- Region: East
- Country: England
- Sovereign state: United Kingdom
- Post town: BEDFORD
- Postcode district: MK42
- Dialling code: 01234
- Police: Bedfordshire
- Fire: Bedfordshire
- Ambulance: East of England
- UK Parliament: Bedford

Cauldwell is an electoral ward and area within the town of Bedford, England.

The boundaries of Cauldwell are approximately Rope Walk to the north, Redwood Grove and Willow Road to the east, with the Midland Main Line railway line to the south. The area is sometimes known as St John's.

== History ==
Cauldwell derives its name from Cauldwell Priory which was built to the north of the area by Franciscan Friars in 1238. Cauldwell comes from the Old-English Cauldwella meaning cold well or spring. The priory included a leper colony dedicated to St Leonard.

The 19th Century saw Bedford transform into an important engineering hub. Many large industries located to the Cauldwell area, including Bedford Igranic on Elstow Road. The Britannia Iron Works were opened on Kempston Road in 1859, and General Giuseppe Garibaldi visited the works in 1864. Bedford Infirmary was established in Cauldwell in 1803, becoming Bedford Hospital in 1897. Bedford Lunatic Asylum was built on Ampthill Road in 1812, but closed in 1860.

After the Second World War, the Cauldwell area was significantly redeveloped and expanded, and new residential estates were constructed to the south of the existing area.

== Governance ==
Cauldwell is an unparished area, with all community services under the direct control of Bedford Borough Council. Cauldwell elects two councillors to Bedford Borough Council, both of whom are currently from the Labour party.

== Economy ==
Technology House is an office complex located on Ampthill Road, which is next to a Morrisons supermarket and then an Aldi supermarket. Bedford Hospital is also located on Ampthill Road, as is Bedford St Johns railway station. A small rail depot (Bedford Cauldwell Walk depot) servicing passenger trains opened in 2004. Most of the shops and services in Cauldwell are located on Ampthill Road. These include small convenience stores, a post office and a variety of take away restaurants.

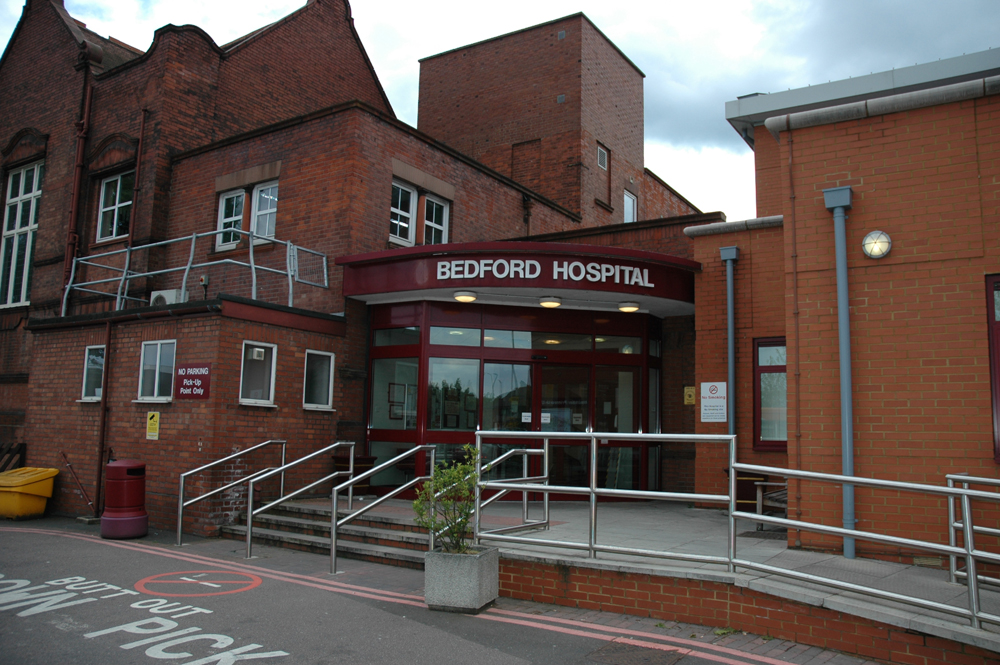
Bedford Hospital is located in Cauldwell

There are more local shops located on Elstow Road and Gostwick Road.

== Education ==
There are two primary schools in Cauldwell – Shackleton Primary School located on Pearcey Road, and Cauldwell School situated on Edward Road.

There is no secondary school in the area. Cauldwell is in the catchment area for Bedford Academy which is situated in the nearby area of Kingsbrook.

The University of Bedfordshire operates a nurse-training site at Bedford Hospital.

== Religious sites ==
- South Bedford Islamic Cultural Centre & Masjid, located on Elstow Road
- The Wesleyan Holiness Church, located on Offa Road
- Southend Methodist Church, also on Offa Road
- The Living Word Tabernacle holds meetings at the community centre on Faraday Square and Kelvin Avenue
- The Potters House Christian Fellowship Church also holds meetings at the community centre on Faraday Square and Kelvin Avenue
- The King's Arms Church (Newfrontiers), on Ampthill Road
- Bhagwan Valmik Sabha, on Muswell Road
- Daarul Huda Madrasa & Masjid (Bedford Islamic Education Centre), on Offa Road

== Community facilities ==
There are two community centres in Cauldwell. The Faraday Community Centre located on the corner of Faraday Square and Kelvin Avenue, and the Cauldwell Community Centre located just off Ampthill Road, on Althorpe Street. There are two open spaces in the area located on Miller Road and Moor Lane.
