= Bedford Cauldwell Walk depot =

Train depot

Bedford Cauldwell TMD
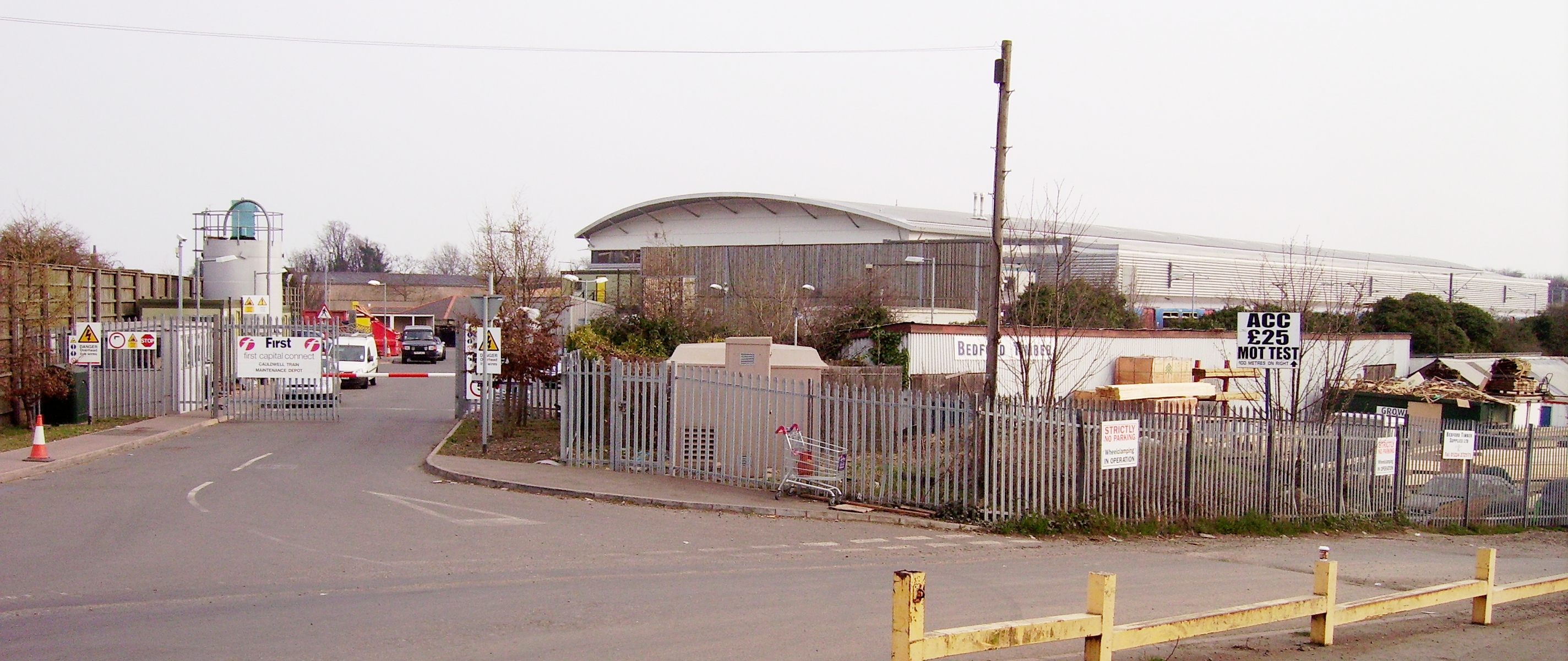
- Depot main building and road entrance (2011)
- Interactive map of Bedford Cauldwell TMD

Location
- Location: Bedford, Bedfordshire, United Kingdom
- Coordinates: 52.127183°N 0.47646185°W
- OS grid: TL043487

Characteristics
- Owner: Govia Thameslink Railway
- Depot code: BF
- Type: EMU

History
- Opened: 2004

Bedford Cauldwell Walk depot, (Note: Also referred to as Bedford Cauldwell depot, Bedford depot, Cauldwell depot.. also .. EMU depot, .. E.M.U.D, .. Traction Maintenance Depot (TMD) etc) is an electric multiple unit maintenance depot located on the Midland Main Line in the Cauldwell district of Bedford.

A four road maintenance depot opened in 2004 to service trains, and was extended to a fifth road in 2009.

== Location ==
Bedford Caudwell depot is located in the Cauldwell area of Bedford, east of the Midland Main Line at Cauldwell walk, and south of Bedford railway station and the River Great Ouse. A rail connection with the MML is made south of the depot.

The facility's shed code is BF.

== History ==
The site has been historically undeveloped for housing or industrial buildings; from the during the second half of the 19th century a tramway (siding) running from the London to Bedford line accessed the site; the site remained occupied by rail sidings throughout the 20th century.

In the early 2000s the construction of phase 2 of the Channel Tunnel Rail Link required a 25-week closure of the railway line between King's Cross and Kentish Town; this blockade would prevent easy access of trains of the London-Bedford line to their traditional servicing facilities at Selhurst depot in south London. As a result, Railtrack calculated it would be cost effective to construct a depot at Bedford to service the trains, and for future use, including as a depot for the Thameslink Programme expansion. The sidings at Bedford station were to be retained for storing trains.

Fitzpatrick contractors Ltd. was given a £11 million contract to build a four road train shed for the Class 319 EMUs, which in addition to the construction of the main train service and maintenance building included stabling for 22 four car trains, a train wash, and controlled emission toilet servicing. The main building was 120 by 25 m (394 by 82 ft). (Note: The Rail Engineer, April 2009 gives an erroneous width of 40m) The depot opened 3 November 2004. The initial allocation was 43 Class 319s.

In 2006 First Capital Connect (FCC) commenced operating the Thameslink franchise and the depot's maintenance allocation was increased to include all of FCC's 76 four car Class 319s. (Note: Transferred from Selhurst depot, Cauldwell carried out A-D examinations on the fleet of Class 319s.)

In 2009 the depot's allocation increased to 82 Class 319s. As part of the Thameslink Programme another 4 class 319 trains were added, and the depot was extended to five roads for the addition of a further 23 four car Class 377 EMU trains to the depot's responsibilities. VolkerFitzpatrick was awarded the main contract for the £2.2 million extension. The depot extension was opened in January 2009.

The delivery of the class 377 trains was delayed by a year, and the initial Class 377/5 was returned to the manufacturer due to the number of faults found, resulting in a further delay to introduction of the fleet.

In September 2019, with the cascade of new rolling stock having displaced all Class 319 trains from Thameslink services, the Depot ceased to be a maintenance Depot, although it continued to be used for cleaning and train presentation servicing.

In 2021, Rolling Stock maintenance work restarted at the Depot, when Siemens, working on behalf of East Midlands Railway, began to use the depot to maintain its fleet of Class 360s, used on London St Pancras to Corby services. The maintenance is carried out by Siemens Mobility, under a Train Services Agreement.
