= First Capital Connect =

Former British train operating company

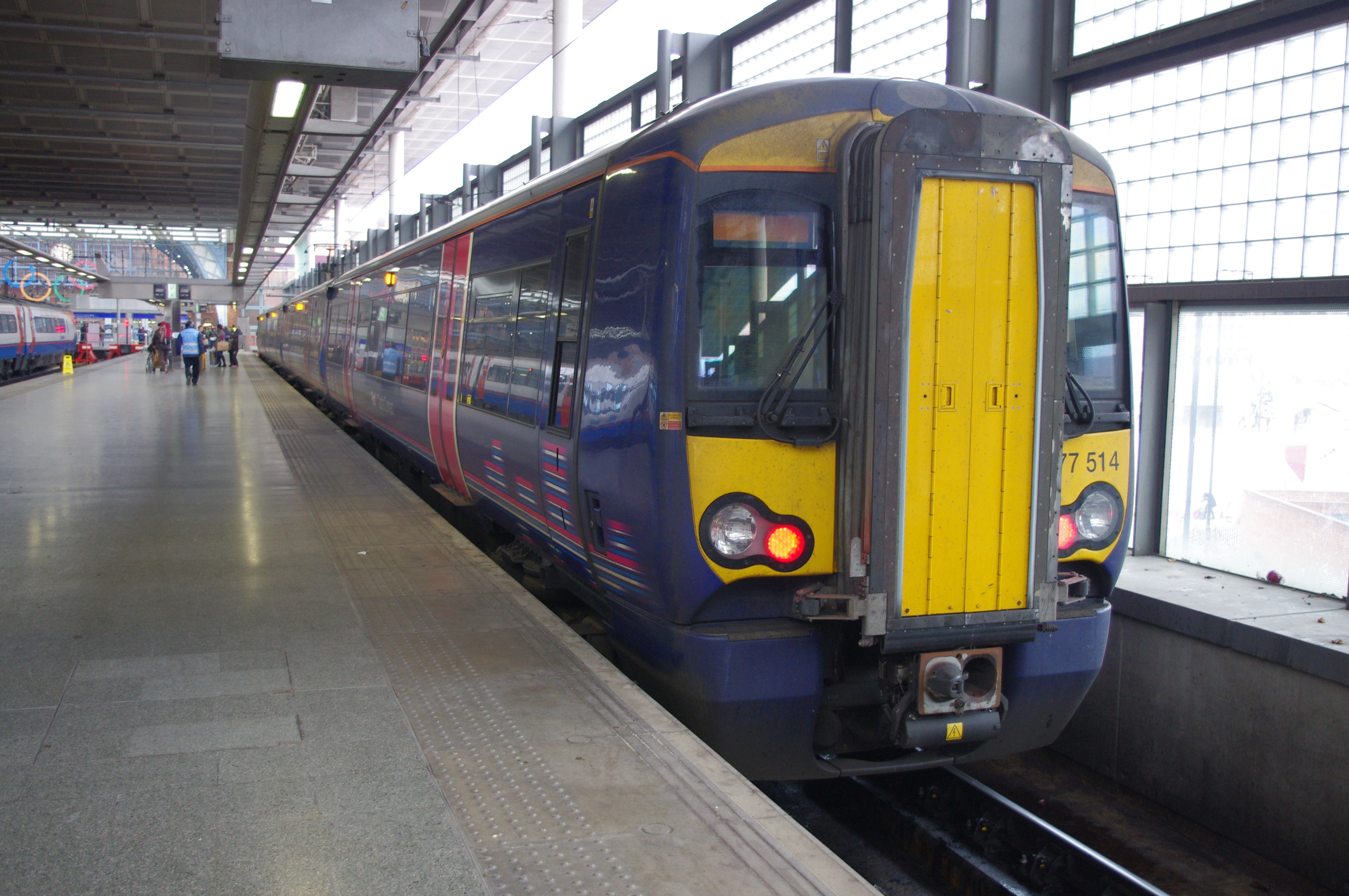
- Class 377 Electrostar at London St Pancras International in 2012

Overview
- Franchises: Thameslink and Great Northern; 1 Apr 2006 – 13 Sep 2014
- Main regions: East of England, London, South East England
- Stations operated: 77
- Parent company: FirstGroup
- Reporting mark: FC
- Predecessors: Thameslink, 2 Mar 1997 – 31 Mar 2006; West Anglia Great Northern
- Successor: Govia Thameslink Railway, 14 Sep 2014 – 31 May 2026

Technical
- Length: 778.9 km (484.0 mi)

Other
- Website: web.archive.org/web/20150524160943/http://www.firstcapitalconnect.co.uk
Route map

First Capital Connect (FCC) was a British train operating company, owned by FirstGroup, that operated the Thameslink and Great Northern sectors from April 2006 to September 2014 which later became the Thameslink, Southern and Great Northern (TSGN) franchise.

First Capital Connect was a major provider of commuter and regional services in London and the south east of England. It operated passenger rail services from Luton and Bedford via the Thameslink to Sutton, Wimbledon and Brighton via Central London.

It also operated commuter, suburban and regional services out of London King's Cross and London Moorgate to Hertfordshire, Cambridgeshire and Norfolk. Major destinations served included Cambridge, King's Lynn and Peterborough.

First Capital Connect ceased operations at 02:00 on 14 September 2014, when the franchise was taken over by Govia Thameslink Railway, and became part of the larger Thameslink, Southern and Great Northern franchise.

== History ==
On 8 April 2005, the Strategic Rail Authority announced that Danish State Railways/EWS, FirstGroup, John Laing/MTR, National Express and Stagecoach had been shortlisted for the Thameslink Great Northern franchise. On 13 December 2005, the Department for Transport awarded the new franchise to FirstGroup, with the services operated by Thameslink and West Anglia Great Northern transferring to First Capital Connect on 1 April 2006.

The term of the franchise was originally for nine years, finishing in 2015. This was dependent on performance targets being met at the end of the fourth year, which would trigger an automatic two-year extension, and an extension for up to three years after the sixth year at the discretion of the DfT. It was announced on 5 August 2011 that the franchise would end on 14 September 2013. "This will help to facilitate the continued project delivery of the Thameslink Programme, in particular the introduction of new rolling stock, which will be completed after the expiry date of the existing franchise."

The Thameslink franchise and the Great Northern part of the West Anglia Great Northern franchise were amalgamated in preparation for the Thameslink Programme (formerly Thameslink 2000), designed to increase capacity on the Thameslink route, with trains from King's Lynn, Cambridge and Peterborough. On 24 July 2007 the government announced that it was fully committed to funding the Thameslink Programme, and the project is now largely complete.

In the early part of 2007, First Capital Connect conducted a study and undertook consultation on options for increasing the capacity of services to Peterborough and Cambridge. The final recommendations involved lengthening four peak services from eight to 12 carriages from May 2009, and adding or removing a small number of stops to balance loads between trains. 1,779 more seats have been provided during the morning peak and 2,490 during the evening peak, significantly reducing the number of rush-hour commuters unable to find a seat.

=== Demise ===
In December 2011, the DfT announced that all services operated by First Capital Connect would be included within the new Thameslink, Southern and Great Northern franchise.

On 29 March 2012, the Department for Transport announced that Abellio, FirstGroup, Govia, MTR and Stagecoach had been shortlisted for the new franchise.

The Invitation to Tender was to have been issued in October 2012 and the successful bidder announced in early 2013. But in the wake of the InterCity West Coast re-franchising process collapsing, the government announced in October 2012 that the process would be put on hold pending the results of a review.

In January 2013, the government announced it would be exercising an option to extend the franchise until 31 March 2014.

In March 2013, the Secretary of State for Transport announced plans for a direct award franchise to run until 13 September 2014. On 18 February 2014, the Department for Transport announced it had agreed a new short-term franchise with First Capital Connect, running for six months to September 2014.

On 23 May 2014 the new TSGN franchise was awarded to Govia with services operated by First Capital Connect transferring to Govia Thameslink Railway on 14 September 2014.

== Routes ==
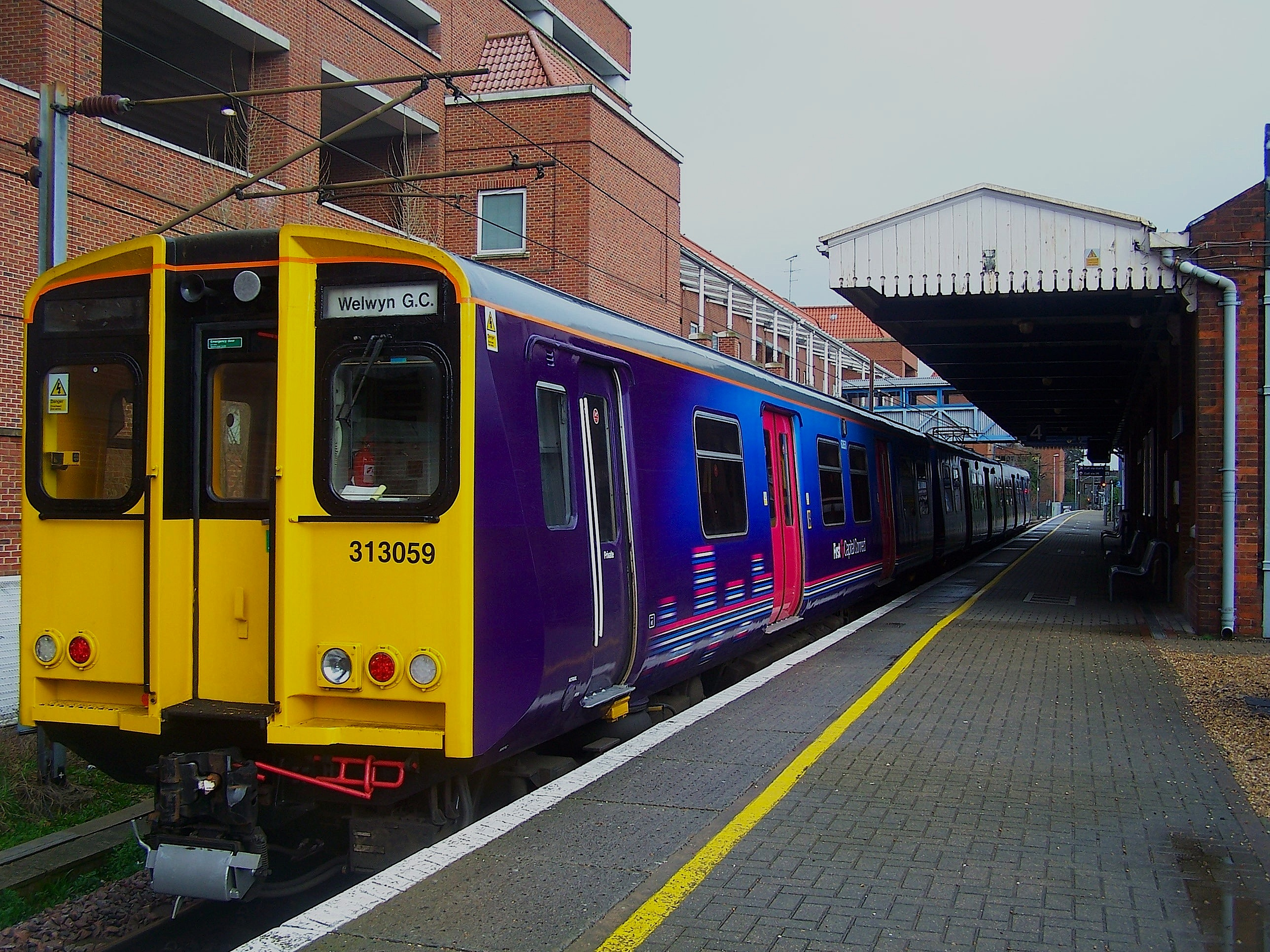
313 at Welwyn Garden City

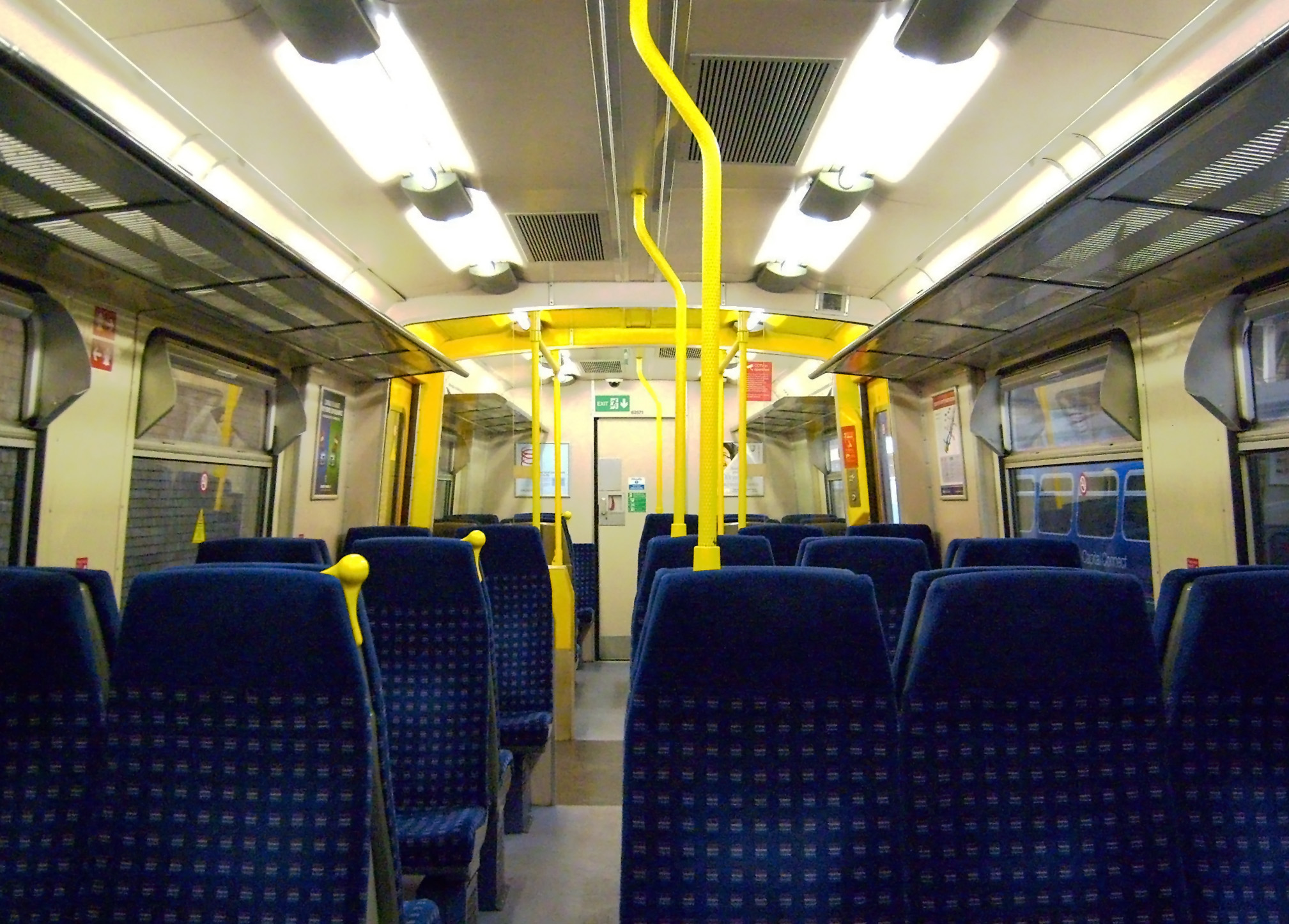
Refreshed interior of a Class 313

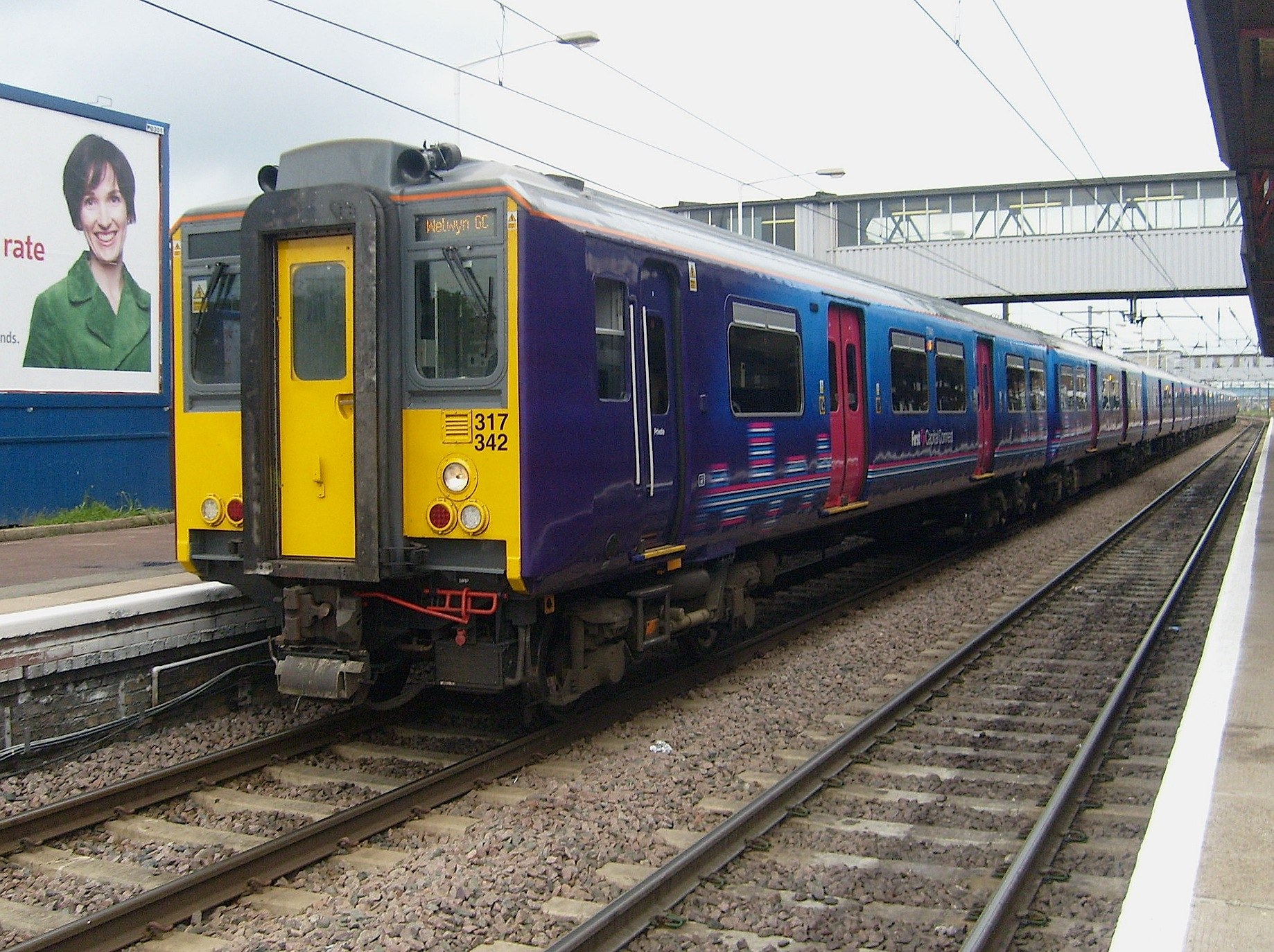
Class 317s at Peterborough

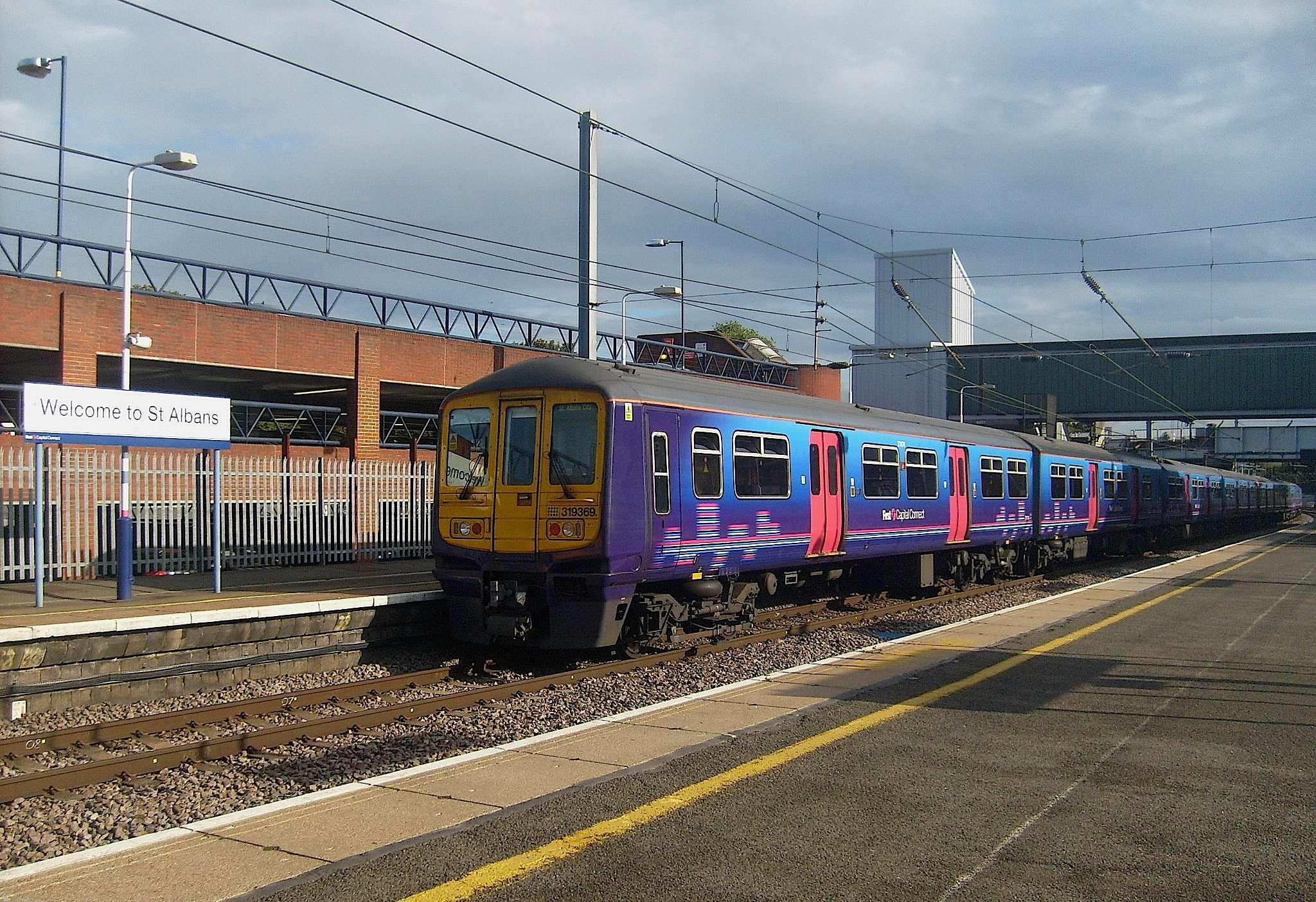
319s at St Albans

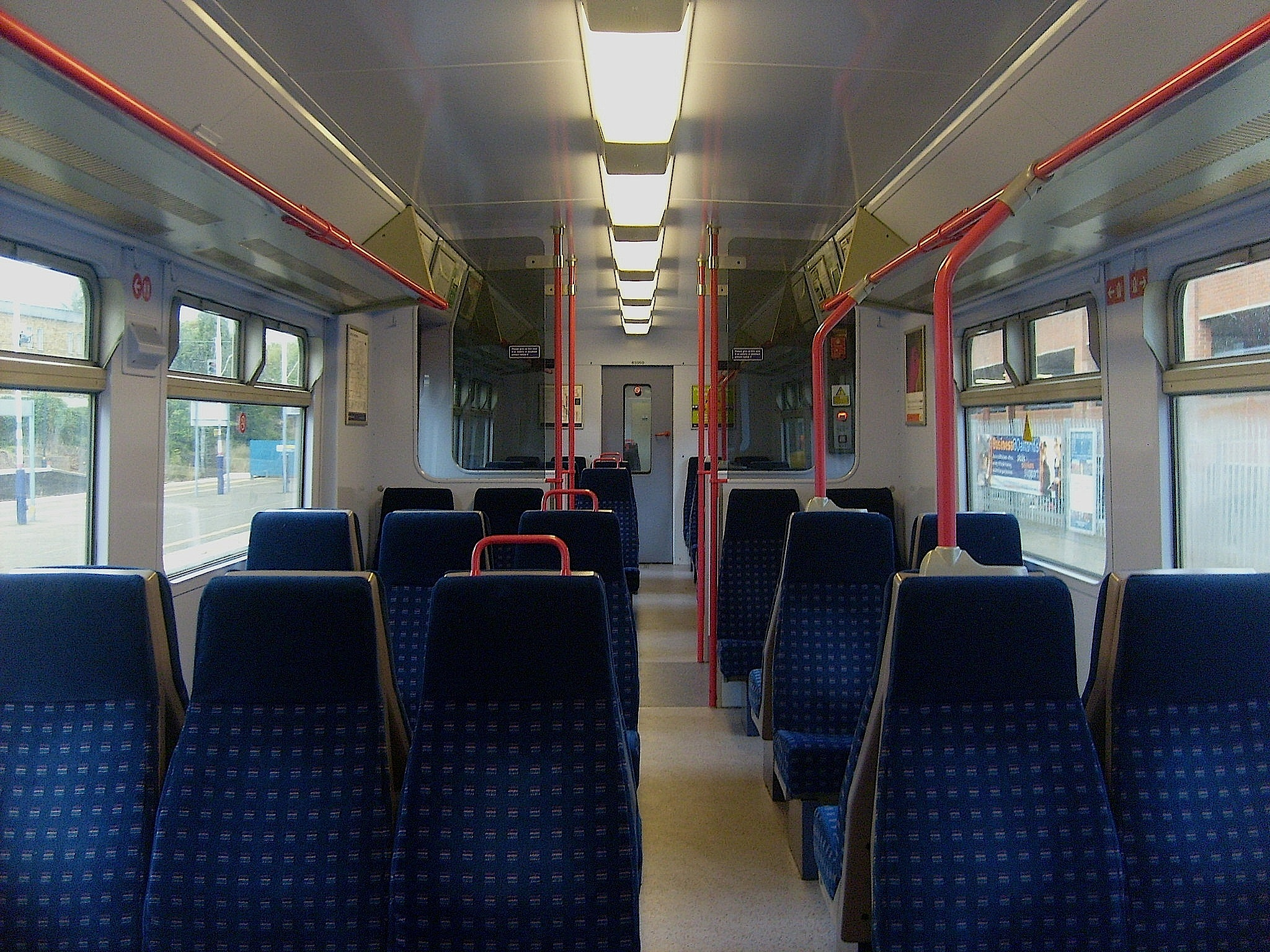
Refreshed interior of a Class 319

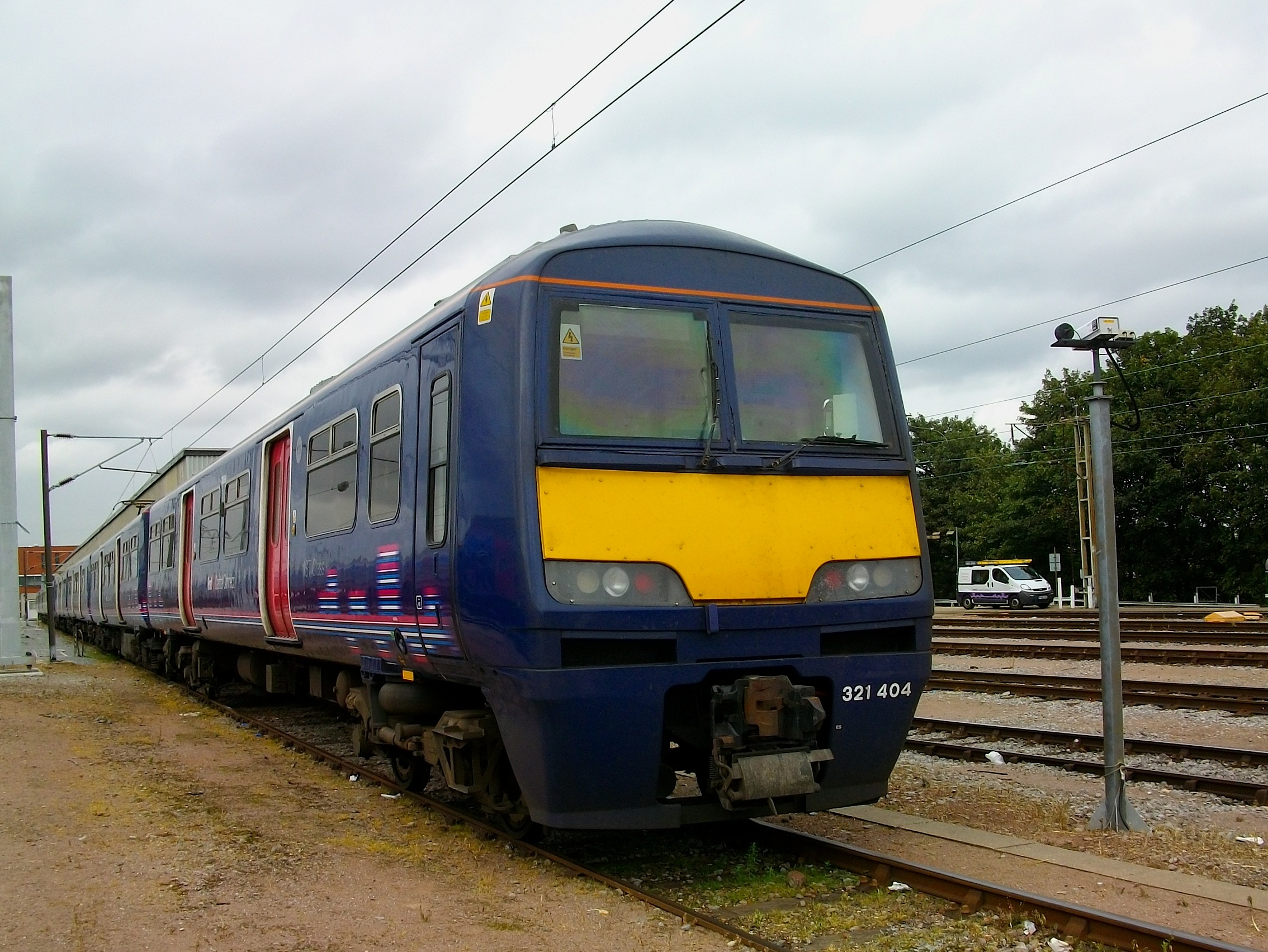
Refreshed Class 321 at Hornsey TMD

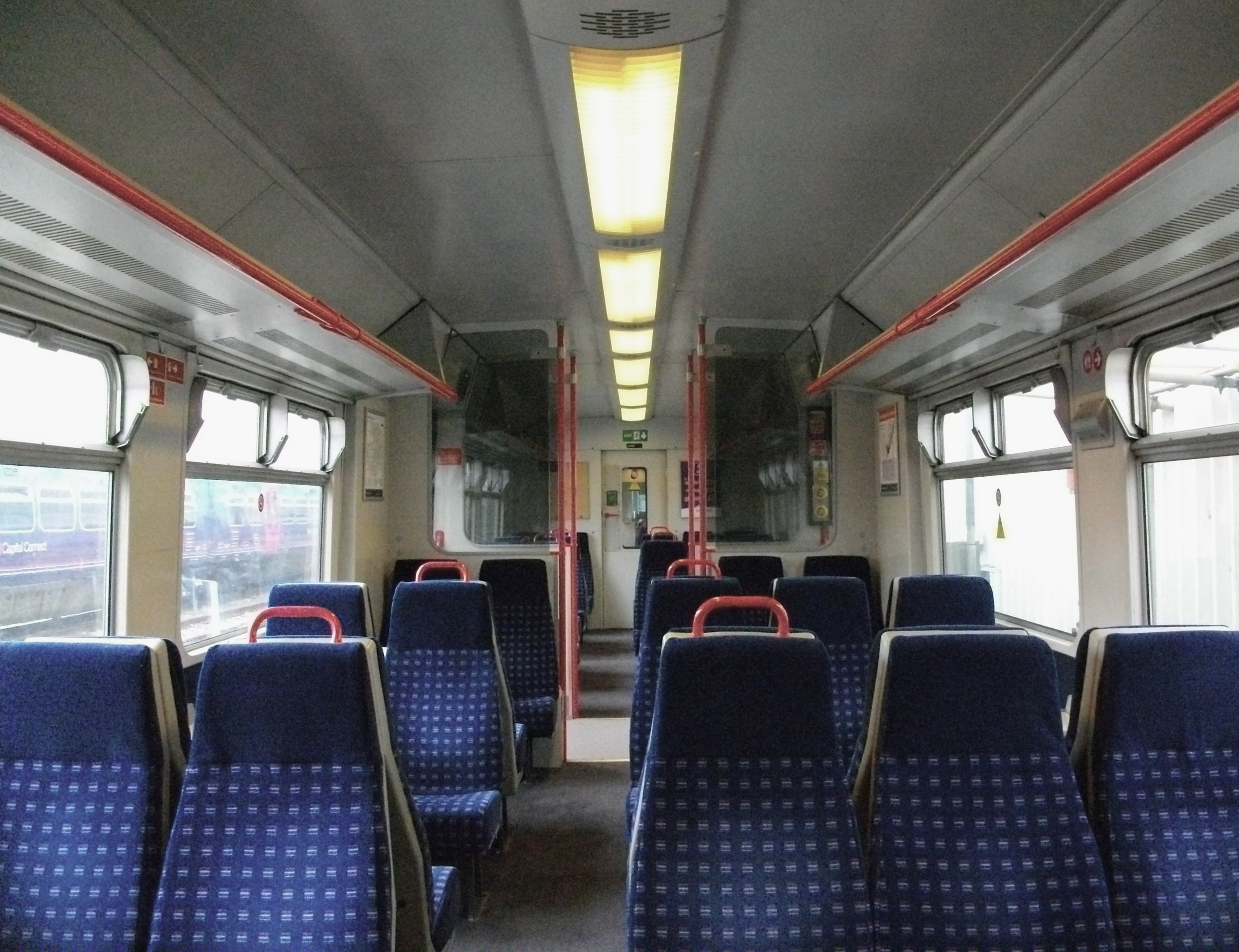
Refreshed Standard Class interior of a Class 321

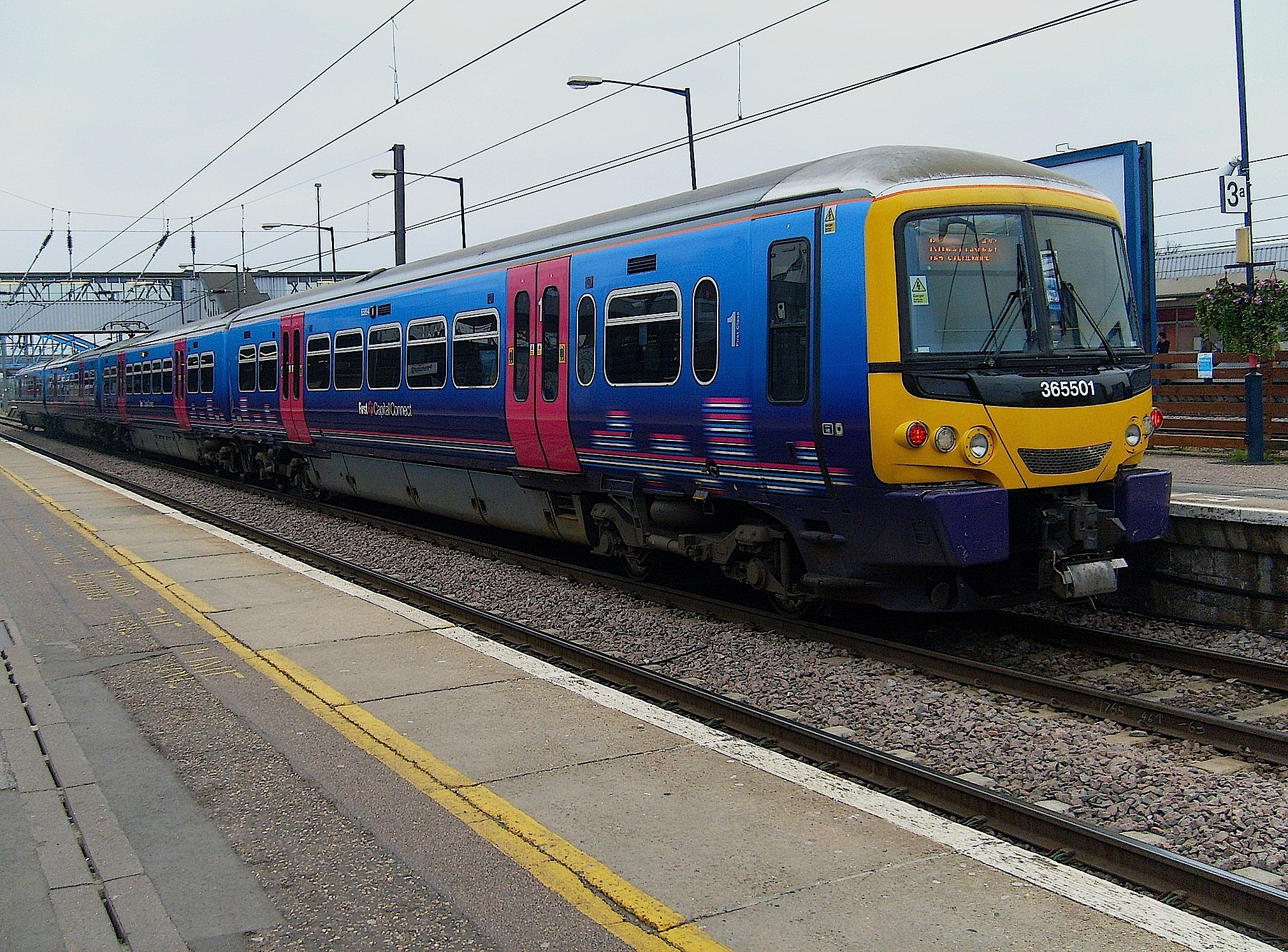
Class 365 at Peterborough

The routes operated by First Capital Connect off-peak Monday to Friday were, with frequencies in trains per hour:

=== Great Northern ===
==== From London King's Cross ====
- to Peterborough – 2 (1 semi-fast, 1 stopping)
- to Cambridge (non-stop) – 2 (1 extended to King's Lynn)
- to Cambridge – 2 (1 semi-fast, 1 stopping)

==== From Moorgate ====
- to Hertford North via Gordon Hill – 3 (1 extended to Letchworth Garden City)
- to Welwyn Garden City – 3

Unlike the Thameslink route, there was only one control centre for FCC services on the Great Northern route, at King's Cross, within the power signal box.

=== Thameslink ===
- Sevenoaks via Catford to Kentish Town (off-peak) or Bedford (peak trains)– 2 (jointly operated with Southeastern)
- Bedford to Brighton– 4 (2 semi-fast, 2 stopping)
- Luton to Sutton (London) via Wimbledon– 2
- St Albans to Sutton (London) via Mitcham Junction– 2

This gave a frequency of 10 trains between London Blackfriars and St Pancras which increased during peak hours.

FCC had two control centres (or 'Service Delivery Centres', SDC) for the Thameslink route. North of Blackfriars was controlled from West Hampstead, within the power signal box; south of Blackfriars from Three Bridges, which was also home to other southern TOC controls.

== Major service disruptions ==
The disruptions were triggered by FCC drivers declining to work overtime or during their allotted rest days, following their rejection of a proposed pay increase of 0% (rising to 3% in 2010). Without access to overtime and rest day work, FCC was unable to provide enough drivers to maintain its standard Thameslink service. Disruption continued into January 2010 as a result of heavy snow in south-east England; although snow was not the only problem, and although significant snowfall ended on 6 January, FCC continued to run emergency timetables through to 11 January.

Trains returned to the normal timetables from 18 January, but delays and cancellations continued as a result of signalling problems. It was revealed that First Capital Connect achieved 60% in its punctuality during the first half of January 2010 on the Thameslink route. First Capital Connect has since offered improved discount and refund packages for customers affected by the disruption.

On 23 December 2010 FCC introduced an emergency timetable on the Great Northern route, reducing the number of rush-hour trains by 75%. This was due to snow which had damaged some of the trains, making them unable to run.

== Customer satisfaction ==
Angry commuters started a petition on the Prime Minister's website to end First Capital Connect's franchise during 2009. Other people have asked for a full enquiry into the service, while Lord Adonis, the former Secretary of State for Transport, described the service offered by FCC on its Thameslink route as "shoddy" and "very substandard", and said that if improvements were not made the company could be stripped of its franchise.

In its Autumn 2009 National Passenger Survey, Passenger Focus said FCC had the lowest overall satisfaction rating of any UK train operator, at 75%.

In early 2013, consumer group Which? carried out a survey which rated First Capital Connect as the worst train operator in the UK.

=== Overcrowding ===
First Capital Connect was criticised for running some of the country's most overcrowded trains; the 07.15 from Cambridge to London King's Cross frequently was reported to have had 76 people standing for every 100 seated. This situation was recognised by FCC itself: "We recognise that overcrowding is the biggest issue affecting our customers. This is at an unacceptable level on some of our services". From 27 May 2009 FCC introduced extra carriages, which meant that this service became a 12-car train rather than an 8-car.

== Pricing ==
=== Fares ===
In mid-2006, First Capital Connect introduced evening peak-time fares for northbound travel out of London as a franchise commitment with the Department for Transport. Previously passengers with an off-peak travelcard could travel on any train after the morning peak had finished at 09:30 however, passengers would no longer be able to use an off-peak ticket for trains leaving London stations between 16:30 and 19:00. Passengers using these peak-hour trains would pay an additional charge to travel. The evening peak restriction does not affect southbound travel. This was introduced due to severe peak-time overcrowding.

Students at some sixth-form colleges were hit by price increases of over £300 per annum when FCC replaced a discount scheme introduced by previous franchise holders WAGN and Thameslink, with its own 'Student Connect' scheme. The level of discount was greatly reduced, and although in theory the scheme is fairer, in practice many students and parents were left out of pocket.

== Incidents ==
In September 2010, First Capital Connect admitted in an email that, despite being trained in first aid, staff were not allowed to offer medical help to members of the public. An incident was reported by the BBC after a passenger collapsed and FCC's station staff would not help.

In October 2010, passengers trapped on a failed train near Cambridge gave up waiting, forced the train doors open and walked up the line to the nearby Foxton station.

On 26 May 2011 at 18:27, passengers were trapped on a failed Class 377 train between St Pancras International (Low Level) and Kentish Town stations, forming the 16:30 Brighton to Bedford service. Another train of the same type was sent to assist the failed train, and was eventually coupled to it at 20:20 but by this time passengers had used the emergency release handles to open the train doors in an attempt to improve ventilation (as the air-conditioning and lighting systems were no longer functioning by this point). The train began to move at 21:03 but this movement was immediately stopped because passengers were egressing onto the track from the carriages within the tunnel. The passengers were escorted back on to the train, which was authorised to move forward again at 21:12. Three sets of doors towards the rear of the train were still fully open while it travelled approximately a mile to Kentish Town, where all passengers then left the train. First Capital Connect admitted a number of failings in the way in which it handled this incident, including a need to improve communications with passengers.

== Rolling stock ==
First Capital Connect inherited a fleet of Class 319 units from the former Thameslink operator. It also inherited a fleet of Class 313, 317 and 365 units from WAGN on the Great Northern routes.

=== Fleet at end of franchise ===
The rolling stock composition is specified by the franchise agreement.

Class	Image	Type	Top speed		Number	Routes operated	Built
Class	Image	Type	mph	km/h	Number	Routes operated	Built
Class 03		Diesel Locomotive	28	46	1	Shunting	1957–1961
Class 313		EMU	75	120	44	Inner suburban Great Northern (Moorgate - Letchworth Garden City/Hertford North/Welwyn Garden City)	1976–1977
Class 317/1		EMU	100	160	12	Fast & Semi Fast Great Northern; London King's Cross to Peterborough & Cambridge	1981–1982
Class 317/7		EMU	100	160	2	Used to provide cover for Class 365 units undergoing refurbishment. Withdrawn at end of franchise.	1981–1982
Class 319		EMU	100	160	84	Thameslink (Brighton - Bedford, Sutton - Luton and Kentish Town - Sevenoaks)	1987–1988; 1990
Class 321		EMU	100	160	13	Fast & Semi Fast Great Northern; London King's Cross to Peterborough & Cambridge	1989–1990
Class 365 Networker Express		EMU	100	160	40	Fast & Semi Fast Great Northern; London King's Cross to Peterborough & King's Lynn via Cambridge	1994–1995
Class 377/2 Electrostar		EMU	100	160	11	Thameslink (Brighton - Bedford and peak services: Bedford - Ashford International/Rochester); Class 377/2s sub-leased from Southern.	2003–2004
Class 377/5 Electrostar		EMU	100	160	23	Thameslink (Brighton - Bedford and peak services: Bedford - Ashford International/Rochester); Class 377/2s sub-leased from Southern.	2008–2009

All Thameslink route rolling stock was electrically powered dual-voltage four-car units using 25 kV AC overhead power north of Farringdon and 750 V DC third rail to the south.

In addition to its EMU fleet, FCC owned the last mainline-registered Class 03 diesel shunter, 03179 Clive.

=== Additional rolling stock ===
An additional four Class 319s were transferred from Southern in March 2009 to expand capacity on the Thameslink route, giving FCC all 86 319s. The DfT ordered 23 new dual-voltage Class 377 units for Southern, which entered service in 2010 and were sublet to FCC until the new Thameslink rolling stock is introduced, to further enhance capacity on the Thameslink services. FCC also gained 13 Class 321s from London Midland: 321401-406 in May 2009, 321407-410 later in 2009, 321418-420 in 2010. These enhanced the capacity on Peterborough / Cambridge - King's Cross services. Three Class 313 units from London Overground moved to the Great Northern route for inner-suburban services, King's Cross/Moorgate - Welwyn Garden City/Hertford North/Letchworth Garden City, once all of London Overground's new Class 378s were delivered.

=== Diagrams ===
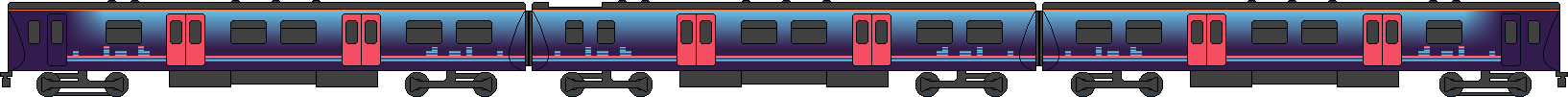

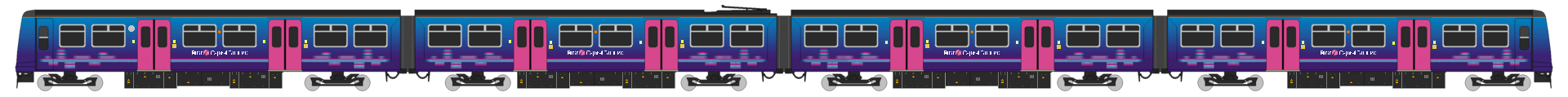

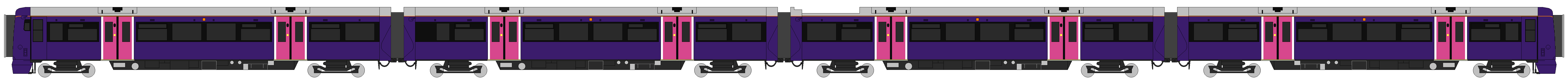

=== Depots ===
FCC operated two depots:

- Bedford Cauldwell - code BF
- Hornsey - code HE

== Refurbishment ==
During its tenure, FCC overhauled all of its rolling stock painting their exteriors in the FCC livery and refreshing the interiors. It had an £8 million programme of upgrades for several major stations.

== See also ==
- Commuter rail in the United Kingdom

Preceded by Thameslink; Thameslink franchise	Operator of Thameslink and Great Northern franchise 2006 – 2014	Succeeded by Govia Thameslink Railway; Thameslink, Southern and Great Northern franchise
Preceded by West Anglia Great Northern; West Anglia Great Northern franchise	Operator of Thameslink and Great Northern franchise 2006 – 2014	Succeeded by Govia Thameslink Railway; Thameslink, Southern and Great Northern franchise
