= Birmingham Snow Hill =

Birmingham Snow Hill may refer to:

- Birmingham Snow Hill railway station, in Birmingham, England
- Snowhill, mixed use development in Birmingham, England
- Snow Hill Tunnel (Birmingham), railway tunnel in Birmingham, England
