= Stourbridge Railway =

English railway company

The Stourbridge Railway (/ˈstaʊərbrɪdʒ/) was a small independent railway company in England which existed between 1860, and 1870 when it was taken over by the Great Western Railway (GWR). The company built a line from the Oxford, Worcester and Wolverhampton Railway (OWWR) at Stourbridge Junction to Smethwick, where it joined the Stour Valley Line at Galton Junction.

== History ==
=== Opening ===
Stourbridge Railway Act 1860
- Act of Parliament
- Parliament of the United Kingdom
- Long title: An Act for making a Railway from Stourbridge in the County of Worcester to Old Hill, with Branches to Cradley Park and Corngreaves Ironworks, and for other Purposes.
- Citation: 23 & 24 Vict. c. xciv
- Territorial extent: United Kingdom

Dates
- Royal assent: 14 June 1860

Stourbridge Railway Extension Act 1861
- Act of Parliament
- Parliament of the United Kingdom
- Long title: An Act for extending the Stourbridge Railway to the Birmingham, Wolverhampton, and Stour Valley Railway at Smethwick, and for making a Branch Railway in connexion with the Stourbridge Railway; for authorizing Arrangements with other Companies; and for other Purposes.
- Citation: 24 & 25 Vict. c. ccxxi
- Territorial extent: United Kingdom

Dates
- Royal assent: 1 August 1861

Other legislation
- Relates to: Wyrley and Essington Canal Navigation Act 1840

The act of Parliament incorporating the company, the Stourbridge Railway Act 1860 (23 & 24 Vict. c. xciv), was passed on 14 June 1860, allowing it to build a three and a half mile long line from Stourbridge Junction to Old Hill, another act of Parliament, the Stourbridge Railway Extension Act 1861 (24 & 25 Vict. c. ccxxi), was passed the following year to allow it to reach the Stour Valley Line at Smethwick. The route was open in full by 1 April 1867.

=== GWR link to Handsworth ===
The OWWR had come under the control of the GWR by this time, and so in order to integrate the Stourbridge Railway with their system, the GWR constructed a link from the Stourbridge Railway at Smethwick to Handsworth Junction, which was opened at the same time, connecting it to the GWR's Birmingham Snow Hill to Wolverhampton Low Level Line, allowing trains to run into Snow Hill station. The running of the line was also taken over by the GWR.

=== Merger with the GWR ===
The Stourbridge Railway was formally merged with the GWR in 1870 by the Great Western Railway Act 1869 (32 & 33 Vict. c. cix), after it emerged that the company's director W. T. Adcock had fraudulently issued stock.

== The route today ==
The line still functions today as part of the Birmingham to Worcester via Kidderminster Line.
