= Smethwick West railway station =

Former railway station in England

Smethwick West
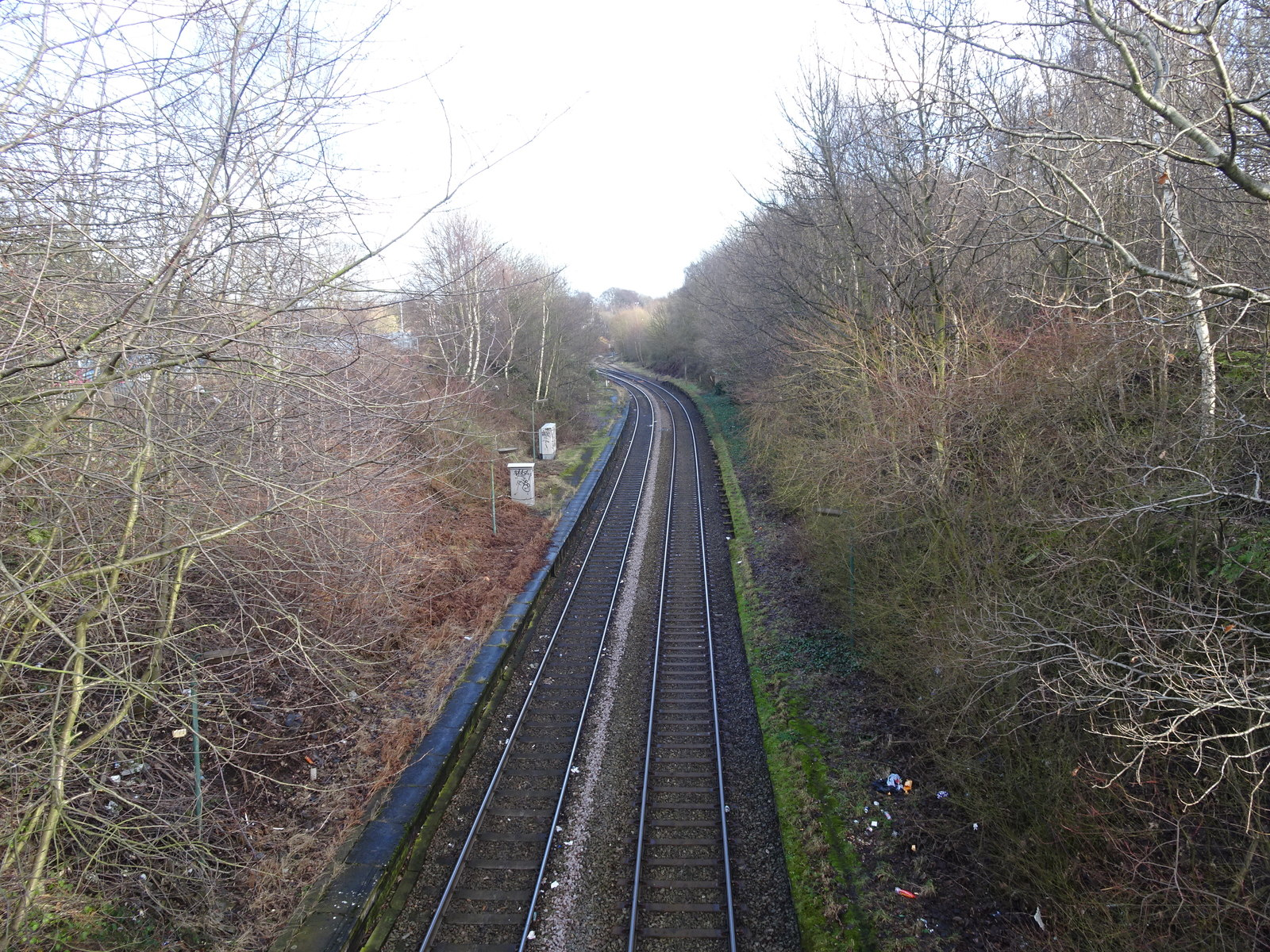
- The site of Smethwick West station in 2018, with overgrown platforms still in situ.

General information
- Location: Smethwick, Metropolitan Borough of Sandwell; England
- Coordinates: 52.5016°N 1.9839°W
- Grid reference: SP011892
- Platforms: 2

Other information
- Status: Disused

History
- Pre-grouping: Great Western Railway

Key dates
- 1 April 1867: Opened as Smethwick Junction
- 17 September 1956: Renamed Smethwick West
- 1996: Closed
Location

Smethwick West was a railway station on the Great Western Railway between Stourbridge Junction station and Smethwick Junction. It was opened as Smethwick Junction railway station in 1867.

It closed in 1996, being replaced by a new railway station, Smethwick Galton Bridge, around 110 yards (100 metres) to the east, which serves two railway lines.

== History ==
Smethwick Junction railway station was opened by the Great Western Railway in 1867. It was located on the Great Western Railway line running between Smethwick Junction and Stourbridge Junction station. The junction connected the Great Western route to the Stour Valley Line, which is now part of the West Coast route. In 1956 the British Transport Commission renamed the station to Smethwick West.

With the run down of Birmingham Snow Hill, passenger services were diverted to Birmingham New Street from 1967; and Smethwick West became a station on the route between Birmingham New Street, Stourbridge Junction and Worcester Foregate Street.

Reduced levels of local services continued from Snow Hill to Wolverhampton Low Level; with four trains per day from Snow Hill to Langley Green, via Smethwick West, using Class 122 units, nicknamed "bubble cars". These services ended in March 1972; and the Great Western route to Birmingham Snow Hill also closed in 1972. A single freight-only line to Coopers Scrap Yard, on the Great Western line in Handsworth was kept in use.

The route to Snow Hill was restored in 1995.

== Closure ==
Smethwick West was replaced by Smethwick Galton Bridge railway station when the Jewellery line opened to Birmingham Snow Hill. Smethwick West was due to close in 1995 upon the opening of Smethwick Galton Bridge railway station, but an administrative error meant that it was unable to be closed until 1996. For this one-year period, Smethwick West was served by one train per week to satisfy the "not closed" criteria. The platforms and station buildings for Smethwick West are still in situ, and trains continue to pass through the site. The station lies adjacent to Smethwick Junction.

Preceding station	Disused railways	Following station
Rood End; Station Closed and Line Open	Great Western Railway; Later British Rail	Handsworth and Smethwick; Station Closed, Line Open
Rood End; Station Closed and Line Open	London and North Western Railway; Later British Rail	via Galton Junction; Smethwick Rolfe Street; Station and Line Open
