= Bordesley railway station =

Railway station in Birmingham, England

Bordesley
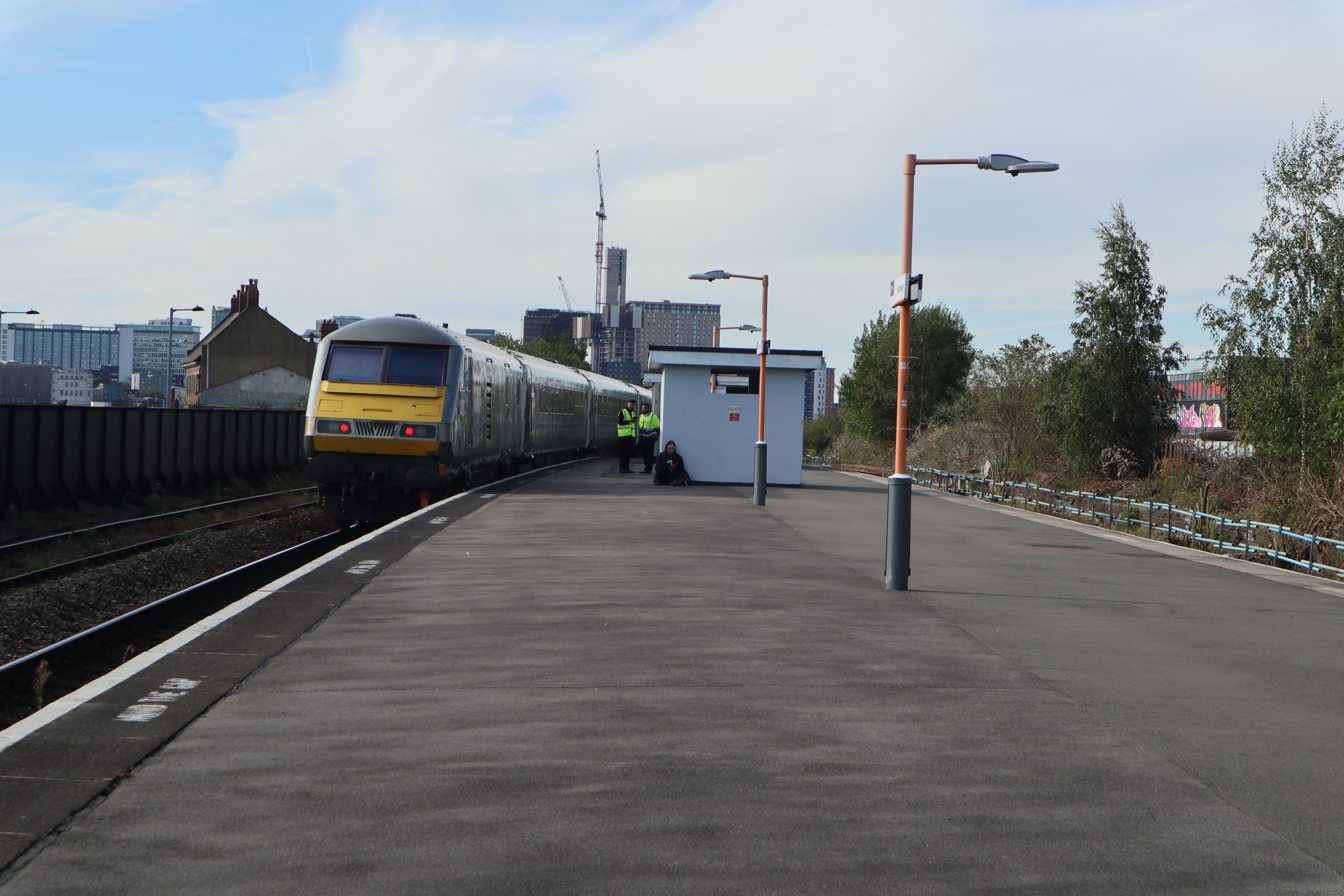
- The station in 2022 preparing for football fans to arrive.

General information
- Location: Bordesley, City of Birmingham; England
- Coordinates: 52.472205°N 1.877595°W
- Grid reference: SP084860
- Manager: West Midlands Railway
- Transit authority: Transport for West Midlands
- Platforms: 2
- Tracks: 3

Other information
- Station code: BBS
- Fare zone: 2
- Classification: DfT category F2

History
- Opened: 1855

Passengers
- 2021/22: ▲10,038
- 2022/23: ▼9,088
- 2023/24: ▲15,116
- 2024/25: ▲29,062
- 2025/26: ▼28,890
Location
Notes
- Passenger statistics from the Office of Rail and Road

Bordesley railway station is a small railway station serving the area of Bordesley in Birmingham, England located between Birmingham Moor Street and Small Heath stations. The current minimal level of service at the station is provided by West Midlands Trains services between Whitlocks End and Kidderminster via Birmingham Snow Hill. The station is the least used in the West Midlands county with 29,000 passengers using it annually.

The station opened in 1855, was resited in 1915, and downgraded in the 1960s.

The surviving single island platform is above street level, as the railway line here is on a viaduct, and lies south of Coventry Road. The only public access is from Coventry Road, directly underneath the railway bridge.

== History ==
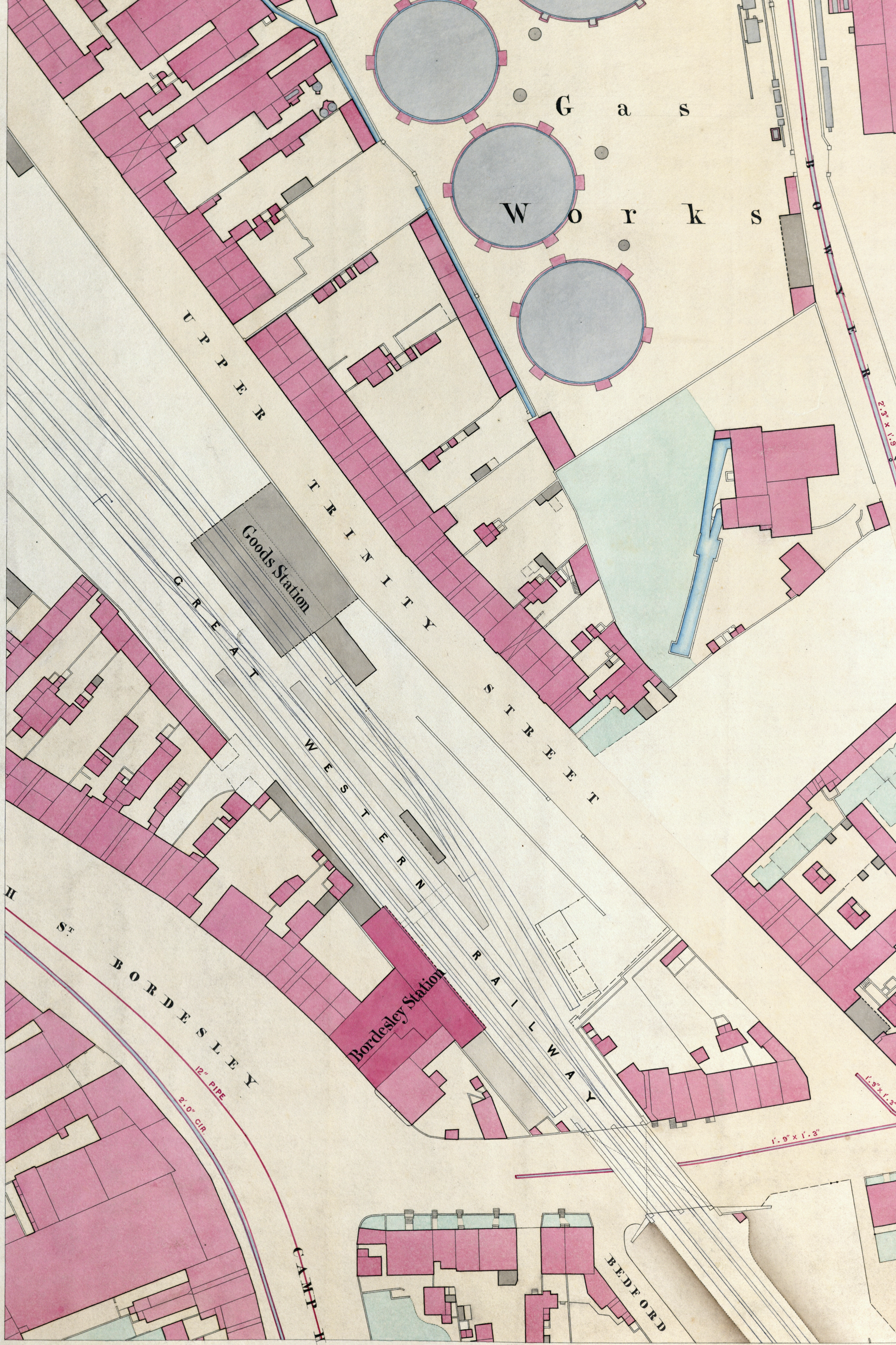
The station in 1855, shown on the New Survey of the Borough of Birmingham fronted onto High Street Bordesley, with the station building and platforms north of Coventry Road

Bordesley station was opened in 1855 by the Great Western Railway on their main line from London (Paddington) to Birkenhead (Woodside). It was originally a two platform station, north of Coventry Road, but was rebuilt south of Coventry Road in 1915 as a four platform station with two island platforms when the line was upgraded to four tracks. The station once had extensive cattle sidings adjacent to and on Duddeston Viaduct. This viaduct was intended to link the line from Bordesley to the Derby Line but was left incomplete when it was realised that trains would be unable to serve Birmingham Curzon Street railway station, where rail services then terminated.

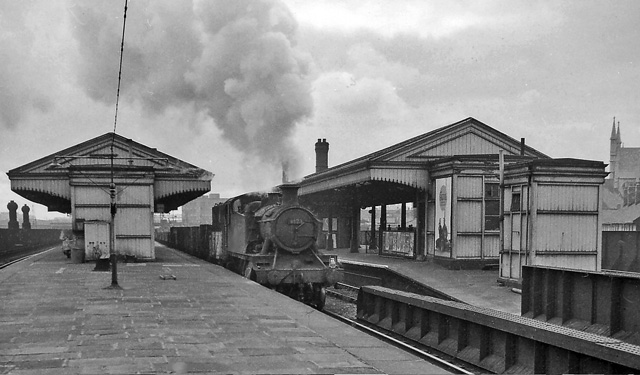
View SE, towards Leamington and the south in 1962

The station still carries the painted lettering "Bordesley Cattle Station GWR" and "BR(W) Bordesley Cattle Station", from the time when, as part of the Great Western Railway and later British Rail's (Western) region, it was used to bring cattle from the countryside to the Bull Ring markets.

The station was downgraded in the 1960s to minimal facilities and services, and one island platform was taken out of use.

== Services ==
Since May 2007, the station has been served by a single weekly parliamentary train in one direction only. Currently this is the 13:47 train from Whitlocks End to Kidderminster which calls at Bordesley at 14:08 on Saturdays only.

The station primarily serves as a match day stop for nearby St Andrew's stadium of Birmingham City Football Club, and additional services stop there when there are home fixtures.

Preceding station	National Rail	Following station
Small Heath	West Midlands Railway North Warwickshire Line; Birmingham to Worcester via Kidderminster line Snow Hill lines Very Limited Service	Birmingham Moor Street

== Planned closure ==
Bordesley station is planned to be closed to construct the Bordesley chords. These chords are planned to connect both the Camp Hill line, and services from the East and East Midlands, to Birmingham Moor Street station, and will pass right over the site of the present station. Network Rail opened a consultation on the station's closure in February 2026, planning to close the station on or after 4th June 2029, coinciding with the nearby planned opening of the new Sports Quarter, matchday traffic instead being moved by the planned West Midlands Metro extension.
