= Rowley Regis railway station =

Railway station in the West Midlands, England

Coordinates: 52.477°N 2.031°W

Rowley Regis
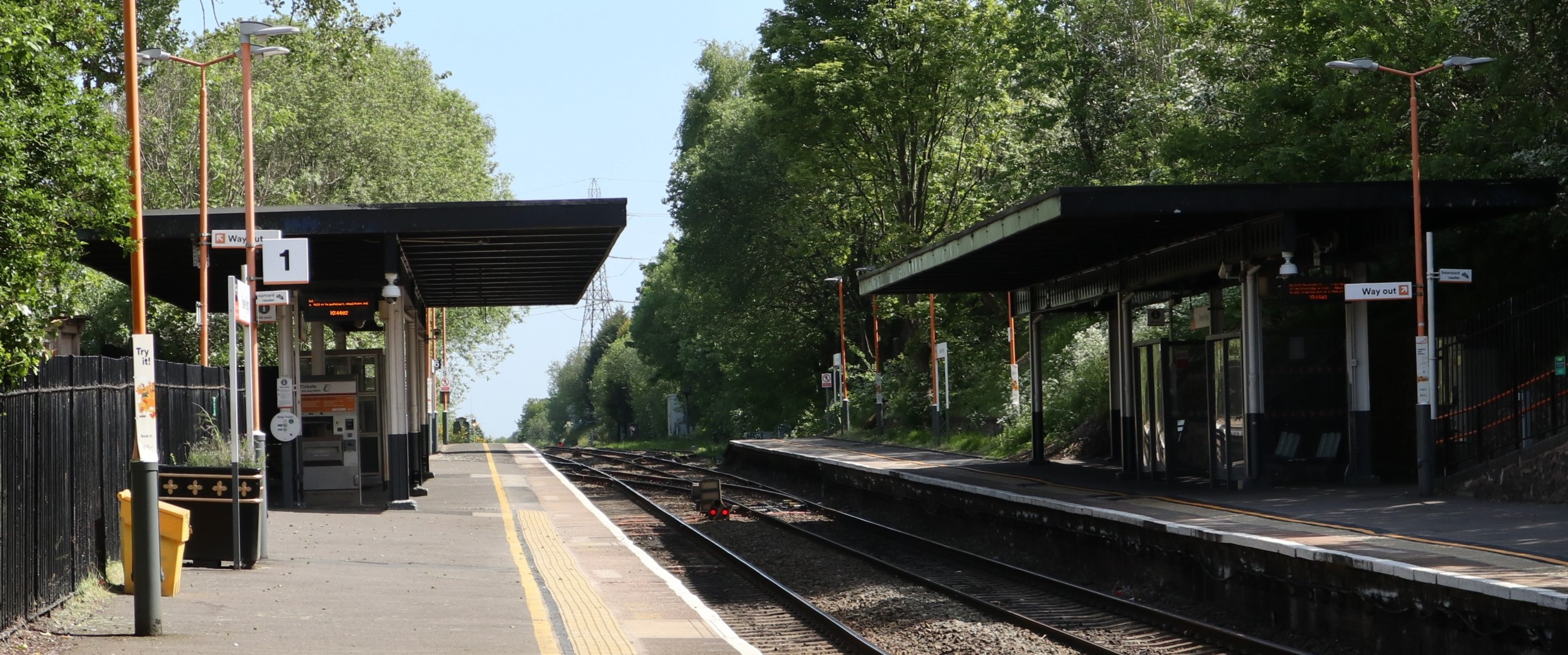
- The platforms at Rowley Regis in 2023

General information
- Location: Rowley Regis, Sandwell; England
- Grid reference: SO980866
- Manager: West Midlands Trains
- Transit authority: Transport for West Midlands
- Platforms: 2

Other information
- Station code: ROW
- Fare zone: 3
- Classification: DfT category E

Key dates
- 1867: Opened as Rowley Regis & Blackheath
- 1968: Renamed Rowley Regis

Passengers
- 2021/22: ▲0.649 million
- 2022/23: ▲0.763 million
- 2023/24: ▲0.886 million
- 2024/25: ▲1.015 million
- 2025/26: ▲1.147 million
Location
Notes
- Passenger statistics from the Office of Rail and Road

Rowley Regis railway station serves the towns of Blackheath and Rowley Regis in the county of West Midlands, England. It is located on the Birmingham to Worcester via Kidderminster Line. The station is managed by West Midlands Railway, who provide the majority of train services; there are also occasional services provided by Chiltern Railways.

== History ==
The station was opened in 1867 by the Great Western Railway on their line from Birmingham to Stourbridge Junction and was known as Rowley Regis & Blackheath until 1968. Goods facilities were withdrawn on 1 July 1963.

== Services ==
During Mondays to Saturdays, there are typically trains around every 15 minutes in each direction, operated by West Midlands Railway, between Kidderminster and Birmingham Snow Hill via Stourbridge Junction. 2tph of these continue beyond Kidderminster to Worcester Foregate Street with some continuing to Worcester Shrub Hill. Services continue beyond Birmingham to Whitlocks End (1tph), Stratford-upon-Avon (2tph), with 1tph via Solihull and Dorridge and 1tph via Whitlocks End, and Dorridge (2tph). Two evening services instead continue to Leamington Spa. On Sundays, there are typically two West Midlands Trains services per hour.

There is also 1 morning train to/from London Marylebone, and 3 evening trains to Stourbridge Junction only operated by Chiltern Railways. This ran to/from Kidderminster from September 2002 to May 2023.

Preceding station	National Rail	Following station
Langley Green	West Midlands Railway; Leamington/Stratford–Birmingham–Worcester	Old Hill
Langley Green	Chiltern Railways; London–Birmingham–Stourbridge	Old Hill
