= Snow Hill tunnel =

Snow Hill Tunnel may refer to:

- Snow Hill tunnel (London), a railway tunnel in central London between Farringdon and City Thameslink stations
- Snow Hill tunnel (Birmingham), a railway tunnel in central Birmingham between Snow Hill and Moor Street stations
