= Langley Green railway station =

Railway station in the West Midlands, England

Coordinates: 52.494°N 2.005°W

Langley Green
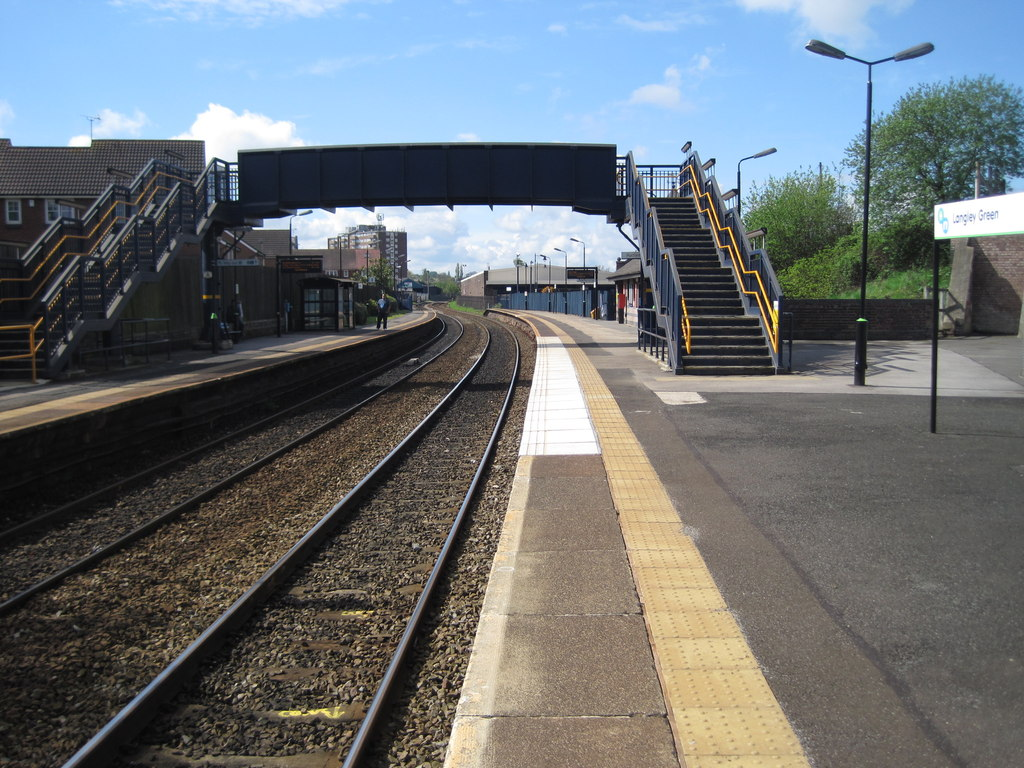
- Langley Green railway station in 2010

General information
- Location: Langley Green, Sandwell; England
- Grid reference: SO997883
- Manager: West Midlands Trains
- Transit authority: Transport for West Midlands
- Platforms: 2

Other information
- Station code: LGG
- Fare zone: 3
- Classification: DfT category E

History
- Opened: 1 May 1885

Passengers
- 2021/22: ▲0.108 million
- 2022/23: ▲0.121 million
- 2023/24: ▲0.151 million
- 2024/25: ▲0.161 million
- 2025/26: ▲0.190 million
Location
Notes
- Passenger statistics from the Office of Rail and Road

Langley Green railway station serves the Langley Green area of the town of Oldbury in Sandwell, in the West Midlands, England. It is located on the Birmingham to Worcester via Kidderminster Line. The station is managed by West Midlands Trains, who provide the majority of train services; there are also occasional services provided by Chiltern Railways.

== History ==
The station was opened on 1 May 1885 by the Great Western Railway on their line from Birmingham Snow Hill to Stourbridge Junction. There was also a Great Western Railway branch from here to Oldbury, a larger town to the north. The Oldbury branch closed to passengers on 3 March 1915; and until recently a short stub of the disused line remained in situ. Its platforms can still be seen at Langley Green station.

The line from Smethwick West through to Snow Hill closed in 1972. In the run up to the closure the sparse service to Snow Hill terminated at Langley Green, with Kidderminster services diverted into Birmingham New Street. This continued until 1995 when the line through Snow Hill to Birmingham Moor Street was restored. Some Hereford and Worcester to New Street trains continued to run via the Smethwick Jcn - Galton Junction curve until May 2004, but the route today is only used for diversions if the normal route to Snow Hill is closed for engineering work.

== Services ==
The typical Monday-Saturday daytime service is every 30 minutes, between Stourbridge Junction and Birmingham Snow Hill, with alternate trains continuing beyond Birmingham to Dorridge or Whitlocks End. Most daytime trains on both routes trains continue through to Stratford-upon-Avon. Most local services are run by Class 172 Diesel Multiple Unit, with the one Chiltern Railways service per day that is run by a Class 168 DMU only.

There are additional services at peak times, though Chiltern Railways services to London Marylebone no longer call. There is one Chiltern Railways service that calls at this station on weekdays only. This is the 21:02 from London Marylebone which departs this station at 23:30 for Stourbridge Junction.

Preceding station	National Rail	Following station
Smethwick Galton Bridge	West Midlands Railway; Stratford–Birmingham–Kidderminster–Worcester	Rowley Regis
Smethwick Galton Bridge	Chiltern Railways; London–Stourbridge; Mondays to Fridays only	Rowley Regis
	Disused railways	
Smethwick Rolfe Street	Central Trains; Birmingham to Worcester via Kidderminster line	Rowley Regis
Rood End; Station Closed, Line Open	Great Western Railway; Later British Rail	Rowley Regis
Oldbury; Station and Line closed	Great Western Railway; Later British Rail; Oldbury Railway	Terminus
