= Rood End railway station =

Former railway station in England

Rood End

General information
- Location: Oldbury, Sandwell; England
- Coordinates: 52.4993°N 1.9993°W
- Grid reference: SP001890

Other information
- Status: Disused

History
- Original company: Great Western Railway
- Pre-grouping: Great Western Railway

Key dates
- 1 April 1867: Opened
- 1 May 1885: Closed
Location

Rood End railway station was on the former Great Western route from Birmingham Snow Hill to Stourbridge Junction. The station opened in 1867 and closed some 18 years later. It was located about one mile north of the current Langley Green railway station. The line is still in use, although there is no sign of the former station.

Preceding station	Disused railways	Following station
Langley Green; Station and Line Open	Great Western Railway	Smethwick West; Station Closed, Line Open
