= Oldbury railway station =

Former railway station in England

Oldbury

General information
- Location: Oldbury, Metropolitan Borough of Sandwell; England
- Coordinates: 52.5012°N 2.0170°W
- Grid reference: SO989892
- Platforms: 2

Other information
- Status: Disused

History
- Pre-grouping: Great Western Railway

Key dates
- 1 May 1885: Opened
- 3 March 1915: Closed
Location

Oldbury was the terminal station on the Great Western Railway's, half mile (0.8 km) long, Oldbury branch running from Langley Green railway station.

== History ==
Oldbury was the second railway station to be opened in the town of Oldbury, in the West Midlands, England. The first railway station was Oldbury and Bromford Lane. This station is still in use and was later renamed to Sandwell and Dudley. However, Oldbury station was nearer to the town centre.

Oldbury station closed on 3 March 1915. The branch line remained open to provide goods facilities to local factories; however, the northern extremity of the line was severed in the late 1960s, by the construction of the M5 Motorway.

Preceding station	Historical railways	Following station
Langley Green; Station open, Line closed	Great Western Railway; Later British Rail; Oldbury Railway	Terminus
