= Smethwick Junction =

Coordinates: 52°30′05″N 1°58′57″W

Smethwick Junction is a junction on the Birmingham to Worcester via Kidderminster Line. With Galton Junction, northbound trains on the West Coast Main Line's Rugby-Birmingham-Stafford Line can join the Birmingham to Worcester via Kidderminster Line in a westbound direction.

Until the re-opening of Birmingham Snow Hill for stations to Kidderminster in 1995, all passenger services routed via Smethwick and Galton Junctions to reach Birmingham New Street. With this re-opening, use of the link between the two junctions has sharply decreased. This was compounded with the removal/re-routing of the Worcester to New Street service in 2004, and now only selected freight services and charter trains use the link. It has also been used as a way to divert trains to Cheltenham Spa via Stourbridge Junction and Worcester Shrub Hill. In addition, the first and last Cardiff Central CrossCountry services of the day, which start and terminate at New Street, use this junction for operational reasons.

On 12 November 2011, London Midland operated a service from Birmingham New Street to Kidderminster as part of a farewell to its Class 150 fleet.
