= Oldbury Railway =

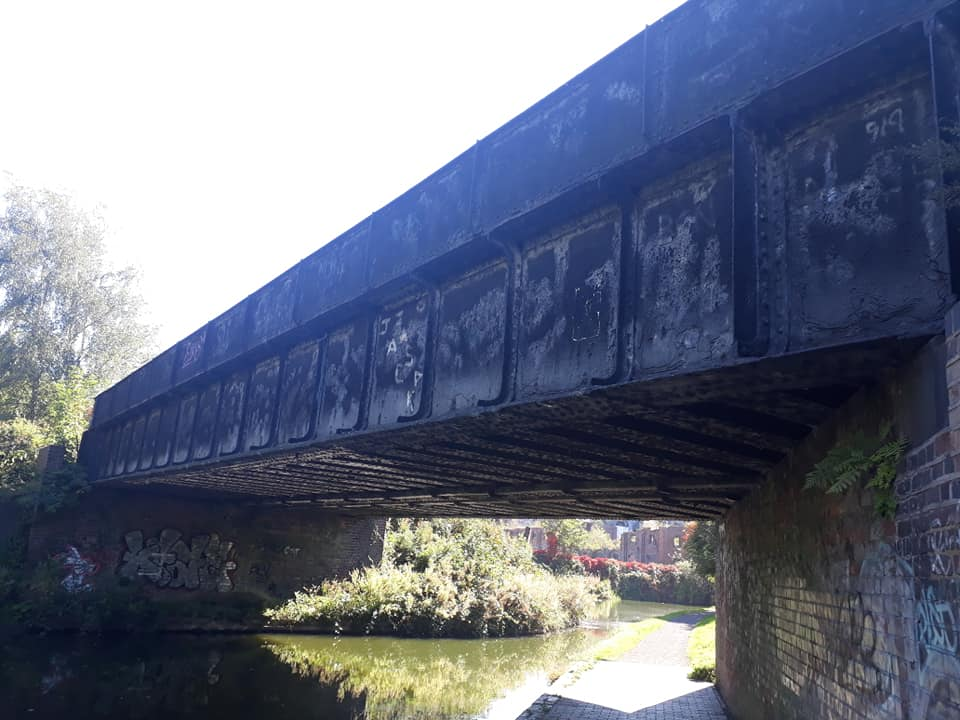
Oldbury branch railway bridge over the Tifford Canal.

The Oldbury Railway was a short branch line which ran from Langley Green on the Birmingham to Worcester via Kidderminster line to the town of Oldbury. It also served the Oldbury Division of the manufacturing company, Albright and Wilson. It was owned and operated by the Great Western Railway.

== Opening ==
Dudley and Oldbury Junction Railway Act 1873
- Act of Parliament
- Parliament of the United Kingdom
- Long title: An Act for incorporating the Dudley and Oldbury Junction Railway Company, and authorising them to make and maintain Railways from Oldbury, in the county of Worcester, communicating with the South Staffordshire and Stour Valley Branches of the Railways of the London and North-western Railway Company; and for other purposes.
- Citation: 36 & 37 Vict. c. cliv

Dates
- Royal assent: 21 July 1873

Text of statute as originally enacted

Oldbury Railway Act 1881
- Act of Parliament
- Parliament of the United Kingdom
- Long title: An Act to change the name of the Dudley and Oldbury Junction Railway Company; to confer further powers on that Company and on the Great Western Railway Company; and for other purposes.
- Citation: 44 & 45 Vict. c. clxxx

Dates
- Royal assent: 11 August 1881

Text of statute as originally enacted

The Dudley and Oldbury Junction Railway was incorporated on 21 July 1873 by the Dudley and Oldbury Junction Railway Act 1873 (36 & 37 Vict. c. cliv) for a line from Langley Green, Dudley to Halesowen; there were also to be two branches. The company entered into a working agreement with the Great Western Railway (GWR) in 1876, and on 11 August 1881 the name was altered by the Oldbury Railway Act 1881 (44 & 45 Vict. c. clxxx) to the Oldbury Railway. The line was opened for goods in 1884, and to passengers the following year; services were operated by the GWR under the working agreement of 1876. The Oldbury Railway was fully absorbed by the GWR following the Great Western Railway (No. 1) Act 1894 (57 & 58 Vict. c. cxliii) of 31 July 1894.

The line was built in 1885 by the Great Western Railway and was built on a short stub of line near the present day, Halesowen Street. There was also a goods yard on an embankment via a bridge on Seven Stars Road, a short distance north of the station.

== Closure ==
The station at Oldbury had a very short lifespan, closing in 1916 as a result of the first world war and never reopened, although the line remained in use for goods traffic to the local factories until 1960s when the section from Albright and Wilson Oldbury Division to the site of Oldbury was severed by the building of the M5 motorway. This meant the stub north had been closed but the section near Langley Green remained open for freight traffic until 1996 when the entire line was put out of use.

== Present day ==
Today, the station site at Oldbury has been redeveloped for both industrial use near the former goods yard and the station site is now a Mecca Bingo hall. The trackbed to Tat Bank Road near the former Albright and Wilson Oldbury Division has been blocked by the M5 viaduct and the section built on by both housing and road realignments. There is still quite a lot of track still in situ around the former sidings at Albright and Wilson Oldbury Division and the bridge over the Titford Canal. The track has been dismantled and fenced off at the former Oldbury Platforms at Langley Green although still extant.

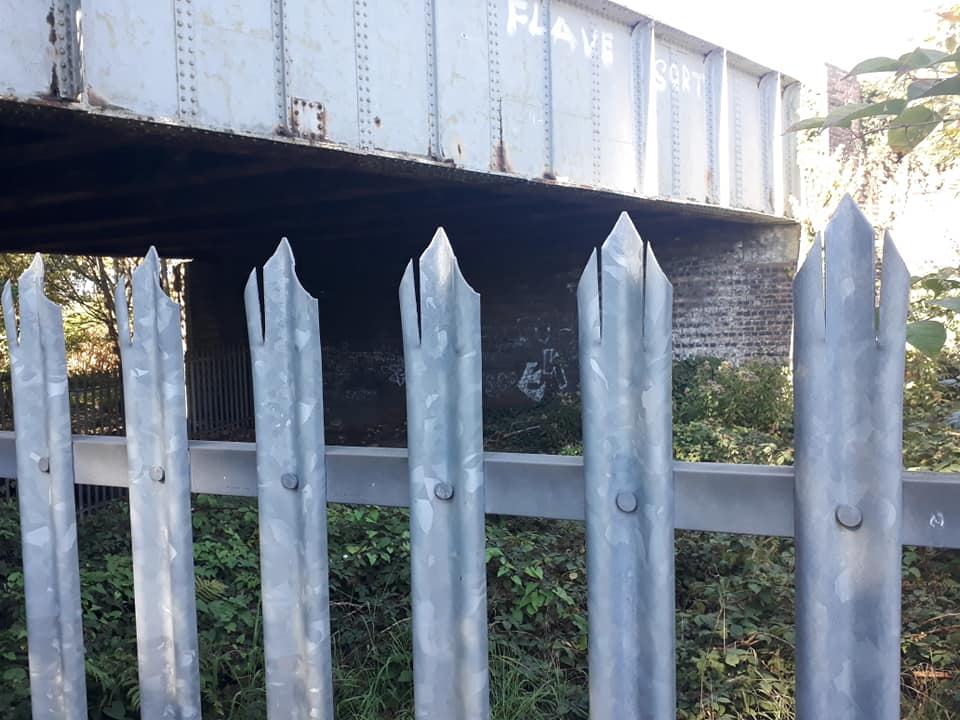
Disused platforms at Langley Green, which were the Oldbury Branch platforms
