= Galton Junction =

Coordinates: 52.5003°N 1.9776°W

Galton Junction is a minor junction on the United Kingdom's West Coast Main Line's Rugby-Birmingham-Stafford Line. With Smethwick Junction, it allows northbound trains from the RBS to join the Birmingham to Worcester via Kidderminster Line in a westbound direction and vice versa.

Until the re-opening of Birmingham Snow Hill for stations to Kidderminster, in 1995, all passenger services routed via Galton and Smethwick Junctions to reach Birmingham New Street. With this re-opening, use of the junction has sharply decreased. This was compounded with the removal of the remaining services between Worcester and New Street in May 2004, and now only selected freight services and charter trains use the junction. It has also been used as a way to divert trains to Cheltenham Spa via Stourbridge Junction and Worcester Shrub Hill. In addition, the first and last CrossCountry services of the day to/from Cardiff Central, which start and terminate at New Street, use this junction for operational reasons.
