= Snow Hill tunnel (Birmingham) =

Railway tunnel underneath Birmingham city-centre, England

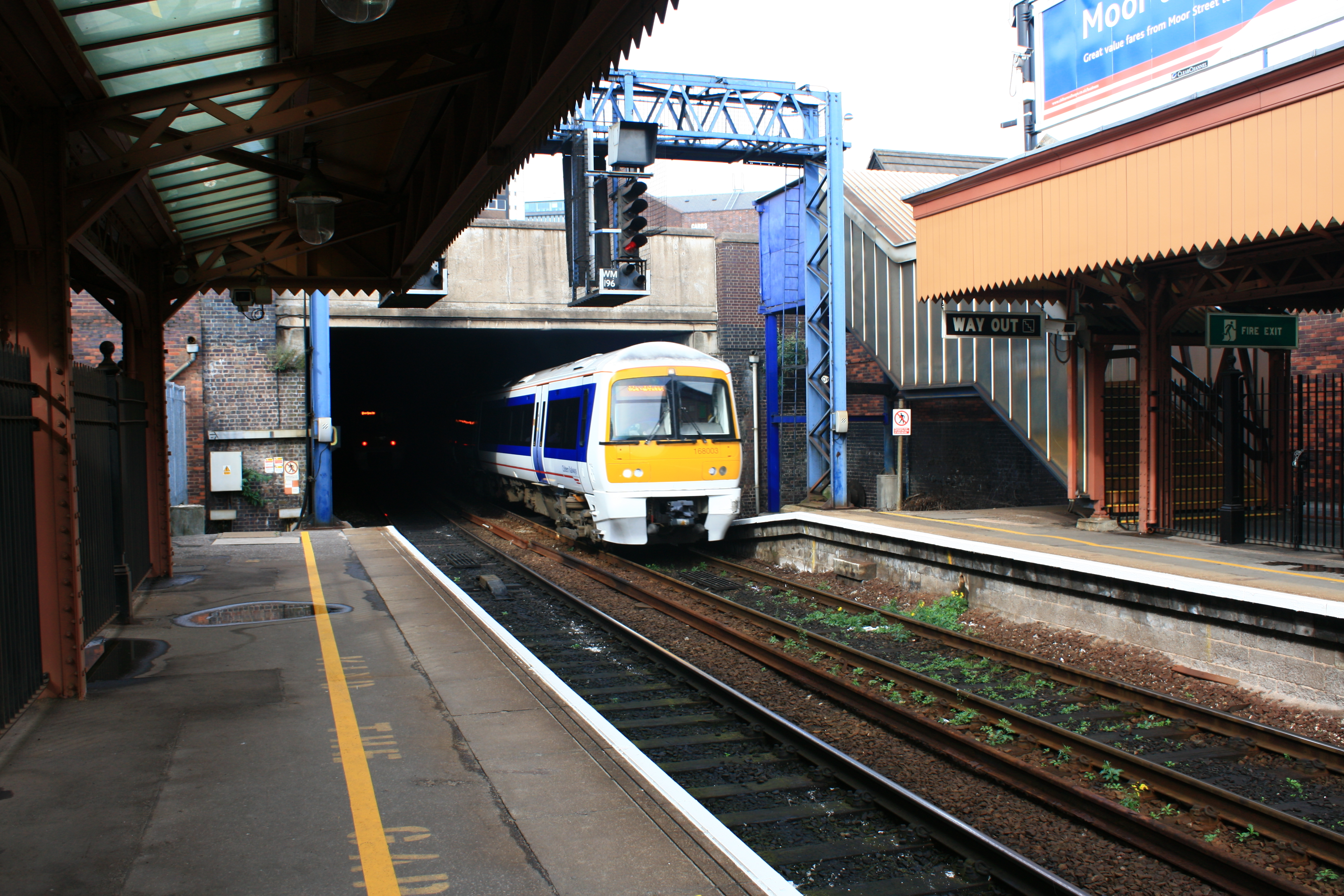
A Chiltern Railways train emerges from the southern portal of Snow Hill Tunnel, and into Moor Street station

Snow Hill Tunnel is a railway tunnel underneath Birmingham city-centre. It runs for 635 yards (580 metres), linking Birmingham Moor Street station at its southern end, with Birmingham Snow Hill station at its northern end. It is a vital link in the cross-city Snow Hill Lines.

== History ==
The tunnel was opened in 1852 by the Great Western Railway as part of its London Paddington to Birkenhead Woodside main line. It was built using the cut and cover method as far as Temple Row, and then a deep cutting to Snow Hill. In 1872 the cutting from Temple Row to Snow Hill was roofed over and the Great Western Arcade built on top.

=== Bank of England siding ===
At the Snow Hill end of the tunnel, a short siding existed within the tunnel, alongside which was an underground entrance to the Birmingham branch of the Bank of England. The siding was used to transport cash and bullion by train to and from the bank, a facility which was last used in the mid-1960s. The bank entrance is now sealed up.

=== Bottleneck ===
As traffic into Snow Hill station grew, the twin tracked tunnel became a capacity bottleneck. This proved to be a problem when Snow Hill station was rebuilt and expanded in the 1900s. It was not economically feasible to widen the tunnel, as this would have required demolition of prime city-centre buildings whose foundations impeded construction. The capacity problem was therefore solved by building Moor Street station as a terminus at the southern end of the tunnel, in order to allow local trains from the south to terminate there instead of Snow Hill.

=== Closure and reopening ===
Snow Hill station was run down and closed under the Beeching axe in the late 1960s and early 1970s. Services south from Snow Hill were ended in 1968, and the tunnel was closed to all traffic. The last train passed through on 2 March 1968. Trains from the north continued into Snow Hill until the station was closed in 1972.

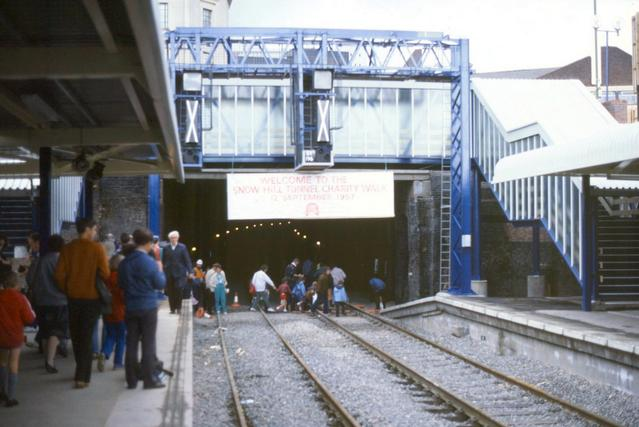
Charity walk through Snow Hill tunnel from Moor Street in September 1987, shortly before it was reopened.

Having been derelict for over 19 years, the tunnel was reopened in 1987, when a new station at Snow Hill was built. Also, Moor Street station at the southern end of the tunnel was re-sited, with two new through platforms built adjacent to the tunnel mouth. These replaced the previous terminus platforms which were then closed once the tunnel was reopened. Shortly before it opened to traffic, a charity walk through the tunnel took place, where members of the public were allowed to walk through the tunnel, from Moor Street to Snow Hill, in return for a donation to charity. The tunnel was officially reopened on 5 October 1987, along with the new Snow Hill and Moor Street stations.

The growth in traffic into Snow Hill meant that the old capacity bottleneck problem resurfaced. This led to the reopening of two of the terminus platforms at Moor Street in 2010, allowing some Chiltern Railways expresses to terminate there instead of Snow Hill.

== Coordinates ==
Point	Coordinates
Northern portal	52.482917°N 1.898458°W
Southern portal	52.479113°N 1.892516°W

== See also ==
- Hockley Tunnels
- Snow Hill Tunnel (London) - unrelated tunnel of the same name in London.
