= Birmingham to Worcester via Kidderminster line =

Railway line in the West Midlands, England

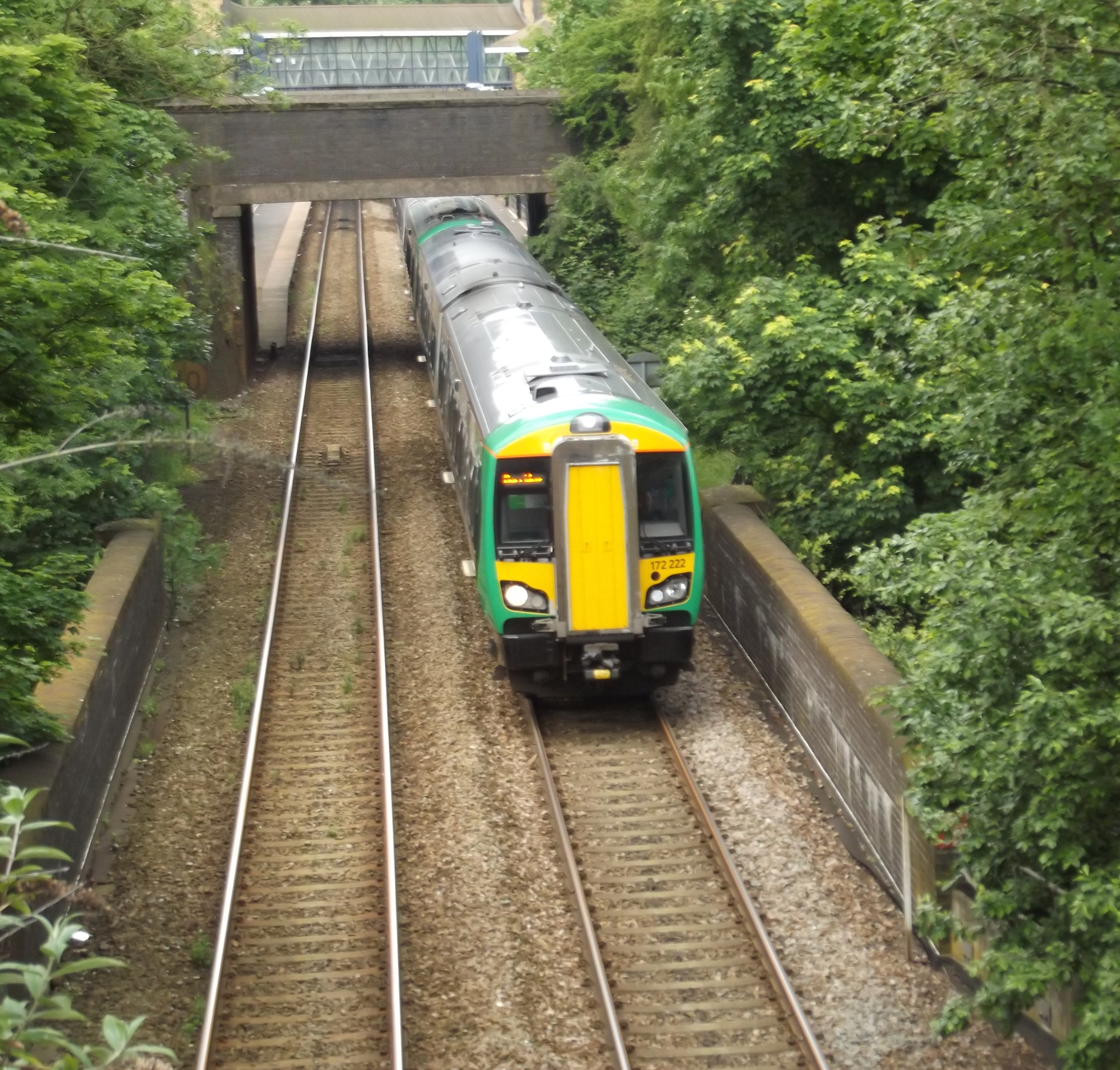
- Class 172 pulls out from Smethwick Galton Bridge.

Overview
- Status: Operational
- Owner: Network Rail
- Locale: Worcestershire; West Midlands; West Midlands (region)
- Termini: Birmingham Snow Hill; Worcester
- Stations: 16

Service
- Type: Suburban rail, Heavy rail
- System: National Rail
- Operator(s): West Midlands Trains; Chiltern Railways; CrossCountry; Great Western Railway
- Rolling stock: Class 168 Clubman; Class 170 Turbostar; Class 172 Turbostar; Class 196 Civity; Class 220 Voyager; Class 221 Super Voyager; Class 800 Intercity Express Train

History
- Opened: 1867

Technical
- Track gauge: 1,435 mm (4 ft 8 1/2 in) standard gauge
Route map
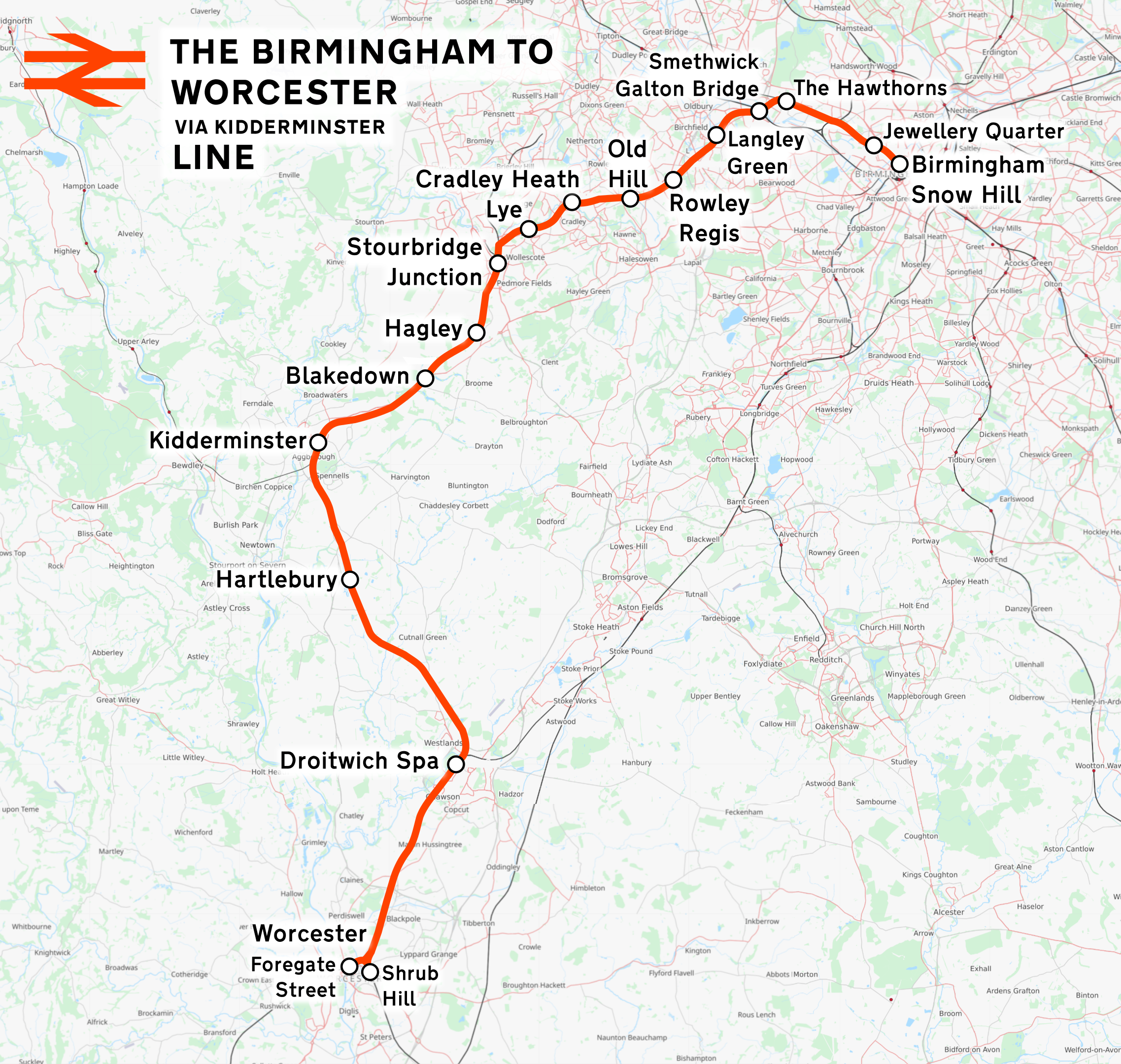
(Click to expand)

The Birmingham to Worcester via Kidderminster line is a railway line which runs from Birmingham Snow Hill to Worcester via Stourbridge and Kidderminster in the West Midlands, England. It is one of the Snow Hill Lines, with trains operated by West Midlands Trains and Chiltern Railways using a variety of rolling stock including Class 172 and Class 168 diesel units. It is a future aspiration of Network Rail to electrify the entire line, as well as the Chiltern Main Line to London Marylebone.

The line is one of two railway routes between Birmingham and Worcester, the other route runs via Bromsgrove.

== History ==
- The line between Worcester and Stourbridge Junction was opened as part of the Oxford, Worcester and Wolverhampton Railway (OWWR), in 1852.
- Opening in 1867, the line between Stourbridge Junction and Smethwick was built by an independent company; the Stourbridge Railway; at Smethwick this line joined the Stour Valley Line at Galton Junction.
- A short link was opened at the same time by the Great Western Railway (GWR) which connected the Stourbridge Railway at Smethwick to the Birmingham Snow Hill to Wolverhampton Line at Handsworth, allowing trains to run into Snow Hill station. By 1870, the OWWR and Stourbridge Railway had been absorbed by the GWR, later passing to British Railways in 1948.

The line was used mostly by GWR trains from Snow Hill, but some London and North Western Railway and Midland Railway trains from Birmingham New Street to Worcester and Hereford via Galton Junction also used the line, until 1917, when all trains on the line ran into Snow Hill.

In the late 1960s, services to Snow Hill were run down. In 1967 most services on the line were diverted to Birmingham New Street. However a skeleton service of four trains per day, was retained between Snow Hill and Langley Green until March 1972, when Snow Hill station, along with the line to Smethwick West was closed to passengers. A single line as far as Handsworth was kept open for freight traffic (cement & scrap metals).

=== Jewellery Line project ===
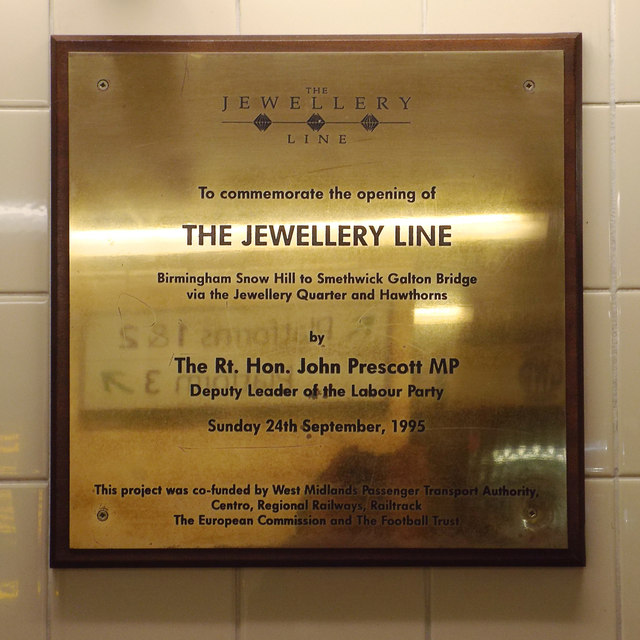
Plaque at Snow Hill station, commemorating the opening of the Jewellery Line in 1995.

Snow Hill station was reopened to services from the south in October 1987. In 1993, as part of the project to restore services through Snow Hill, work began on reopening the 4 miles (6 km) of line between Smethwick and Snow Hill as the "Jewellery Line"; the line was reopened on 24 September 1995.

Three new stations were opened on the restored route: Smethwick Galton Bridge, The Hawthorns and Jewellery Quarter. Smethwick Galton Bridge station was built as a two-level interchange with trains on the Birmingham New Street-Wolverhampton Line, and it replaced the nearby Smethwick West station which closed soon after.

The reopening cost £28.5 million in 1995 prices, with the majority of the funding coming from Centro. It allowed cross-city rail services to operate through Snow Hill, and freed up much needed capacity at New Street station. According to Centro, it created "a third cross city line linking the lines to Worcester and Hereford with those to Stratford-upon-Avon and Leamington Spa".

== Services ==
=== Places served ===
The line serves the following places:

- Birmingham Snow Hill – Colmore Row, City Centre and a short walk to New Street and a direct rail link to Moor Street
- Jewellery Quarter – Hockley, Birmingham
- The Hawthorns – Halfords Lane, Smethwick for the West Bromwich Albion Football Club & Midland Metro
- Galton Bridge – Higher Level Station. Local services to Birmingham New Street
- Langley Green – Langley Green, Oldbury
- Rowley Regis – Blackheath Town Centre and Park & Ride
- Old Hill
- Cradley Heath – bus link to the Merry Hill Shopping Centre
- Lye
- Stourbridge – Junction station for the Town Branch
- Hagley
- Blakedown
- Kidderminster – for Severn Valley Steam Railway
- Hartlebury
- Droitwich Spa
- Worcester – Foregate Street/Shrub Hill

=== Service information ===
Passenger services are provided by West Midlands Trains between Birmingham and Worcester and beyond, and by Chiltern Railways between Birmingham and Stourbridge Junction only.

The local service provided by West Midlands Trains comprises:

- Four trains per hour from Birmingham Snow Hill to Kidderminster;
  - Of which two continue to Worcester.

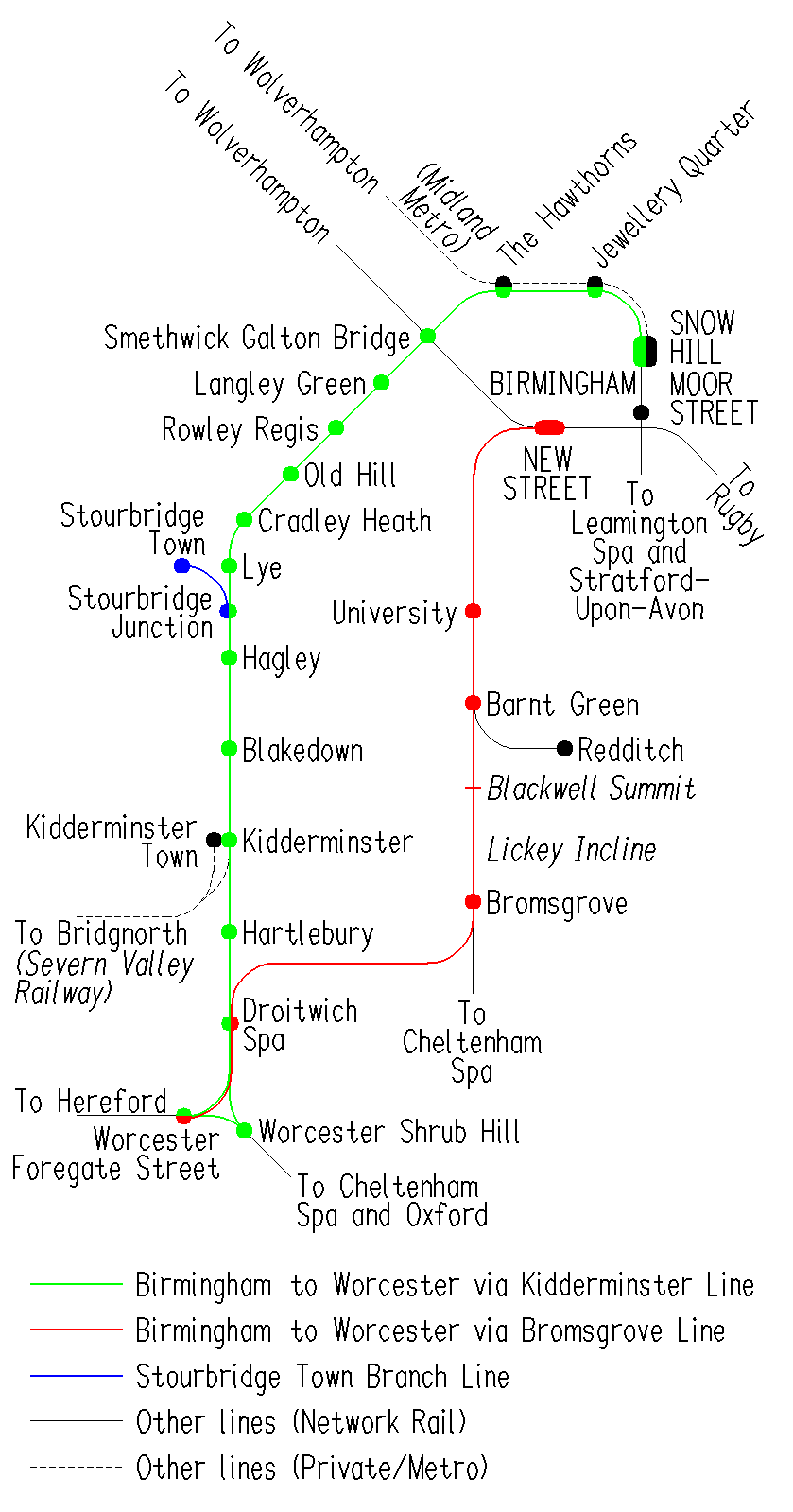
Map of Birmingham to Worcester rail routes

All local services continue beyond Birmingham to either Dorridge, Whitlocks End or Stratford-upon-Avon, with some peak hour trains running to Leamington Spa. A triangular junction at Worcester allows a variety of service patterns (see map). Some trains terminate at Shrub Hill, whereas some reverse there before going to Foregate Street. Other trains take the direct curve to Foregate Street avoiding Shrub Hill. Some trains continue beyond Foregate Street to Malvern Link and Great Malvern.

Chiltern Railways run services to London Marylebone in the morning rush hour, which start from Stourbridge Junction rather than Moor Street, and reverse journeys during the evening.

Before the reopening of Snow Hill, trains along this route ran into Birmingham New Street, where they terminated. Even after the Snow Hill reopening a lower level of service to New Street was maintained, but this link was axed altogether at the May 2004 timetable change, to much local consternation. Passengers for New Street must now either walk between Moor Street and New Street stations, use the Midland Metro between Snow Hill and New Street, or change at Smethwick Galton Bridge. This did however add much needed extra capacity to the Stour Valley Line into Birmingham New Street and free up platform space there. This service took the connection between Galton and Smethwick Junctions near Smethwick West. Services were once hourly from Worcester to Birmingham New Street via Stourbridge.

Two CrossCountry services are timetabled to use the line each day — one service from Birmingham New Street (via Smethwick Junction and Galton Junction) in the early morning and a pair of reverse services in the evening. None of these call at any of the stations along the line and are scheduled to ensure drivers retain knowledge of the route. During congestion or mainly during engineering works, the line sees much more frequent service as a diversionary route. The line from Worcester Shrub Hill continues to Cheltenham Spa railway station, which is the next calling point for most CrossCountry services, and thus offers a convenient alternative when the Lickey Incline is closed.

Several charter trains can often be seen on the line due to the existence of the Severn Valley Railway which has a mainline connection at Kidderminster.

== See also ==
- Birmingham to Worcester via Bromsgrove line
- Snow Hill lines
- Stourbridge Town branch line

== Bibliography ==
- Boynton, John (1997). Rails Through The Hills: Birmingham-Stourbridge-Worcester-Malvern-Hereford. Mid England Books. ISBN 0-9522248-2-8.
