= Langley Green, West Midlands =

Suburb in Sandwell, West Midlands, England

Coordinates: 52.48798°N 2.00509°W

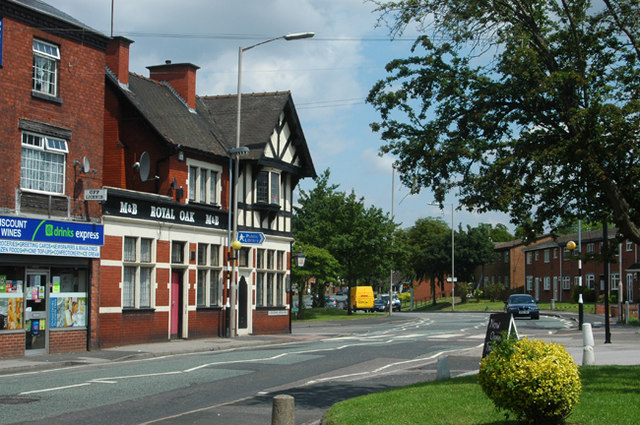
The B4169: Causeway Green Road (in foreground) and New Henry Street, Langley Green

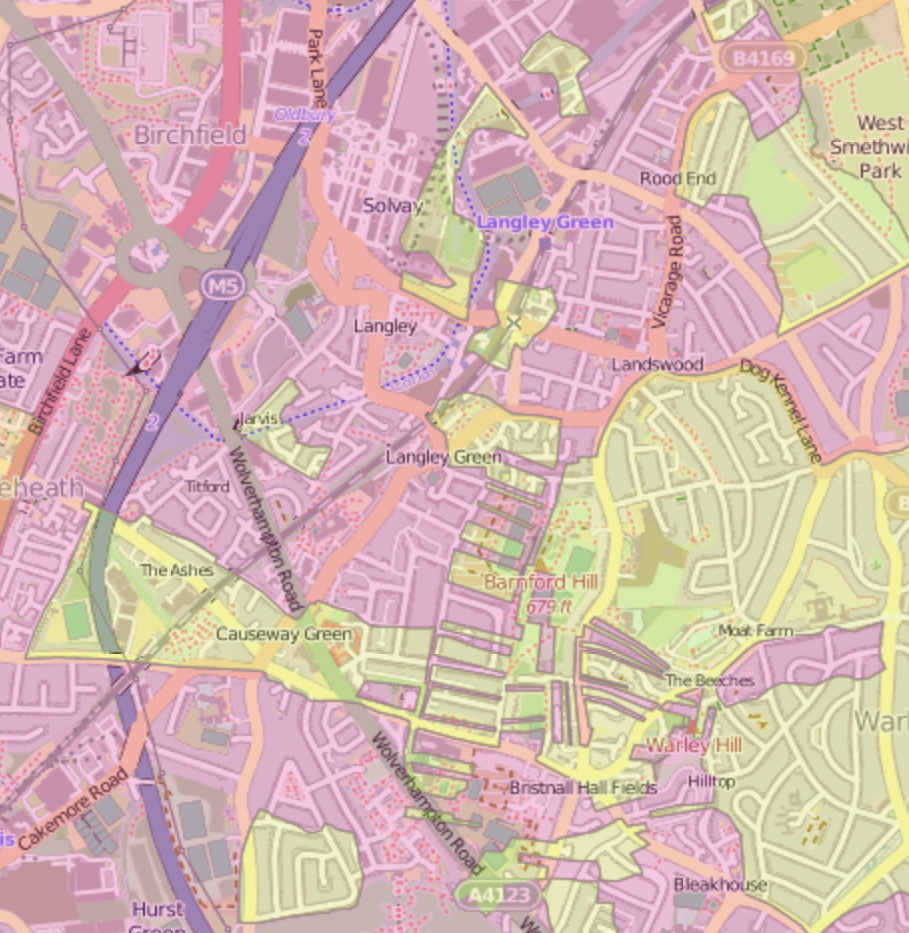
Before 1844, Langley Green was shared out between Shropshire (pink) and Worcestershire (green), including separate field strips. (Historic County Borders Project)

Langley Green is an area of the town of Oldbury, in the Metropolitan Borough of Sandwell, in the West Midlands County, England. The ward is simply called Langley. The population at the 2011 census was 12,969.

Langley Green has a library, a theatre and a railway station called Langley Green railway station. The Oldbury Rep Theatre, which had its first production in 1944, moved to its current location in 1956. The theatre is Sandwell's only purpose-built theatre. It hosts a variety of productions and has established itself as a community theatre providing a venue for local organisations and schools.

Before 1844, the locality was shared between the counties of Shropshire and Worcestershire in an extremely complicated manner.

Langley Green is the birthplace of footballer Fred Wheldon who played for local clubs Rood End White Star and Langley Green Victoria in the mid-to-late 1880s before moving on to Small Heath in 1890, Aston Villa in 1896 and West Bromwich Albion in 1900. He was capped four times for England. In the summer months he played cricket for Worcestershire.

== See also ==
- Q3 Academy Langley
