= Great Western Arcade =

Victorian shopping arcade in Birmingham, England

Coordinates: 52°28′54.78″N 1°53′49.75″W

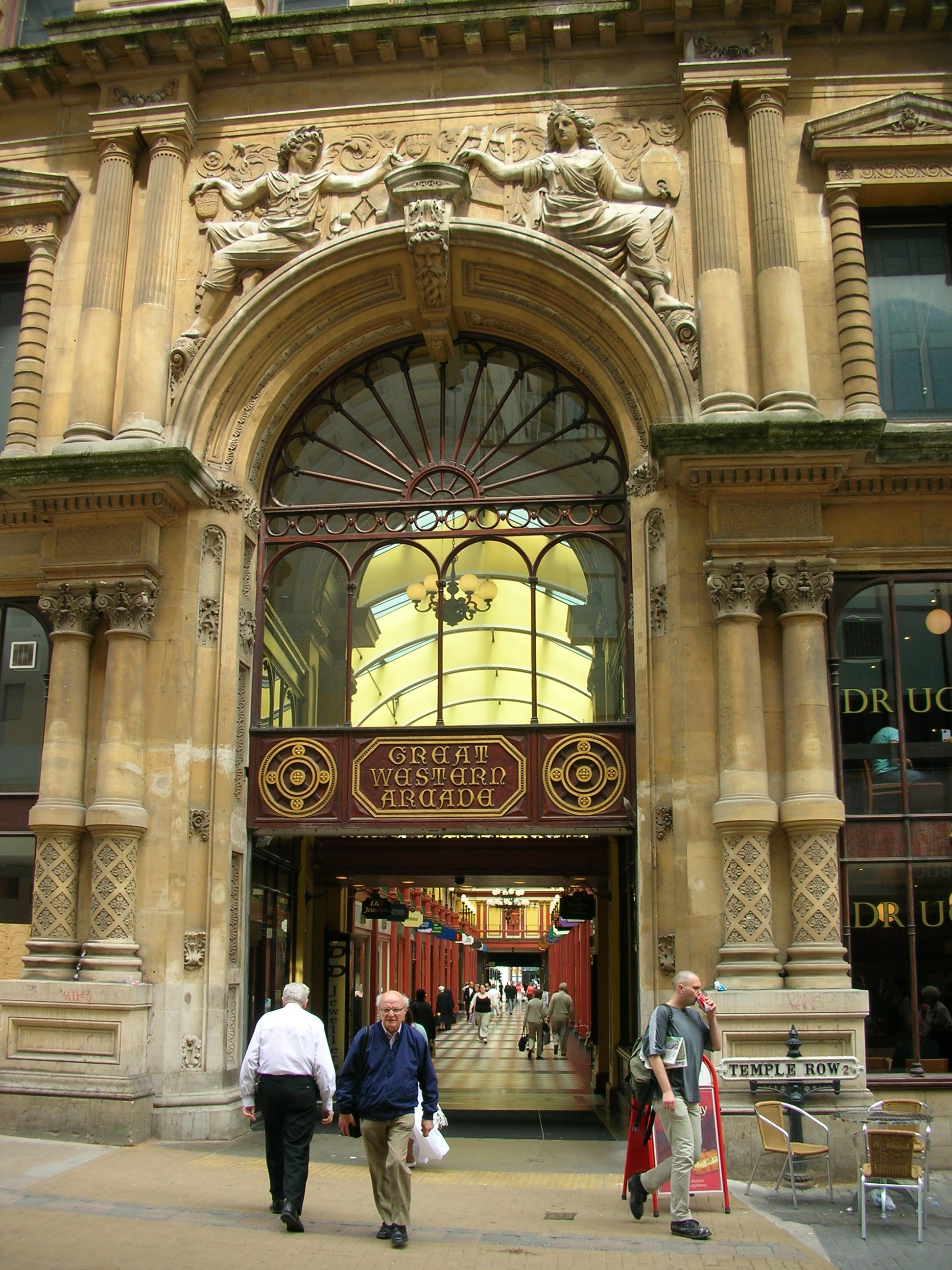
Great Western Arcade, Temple Row entrance

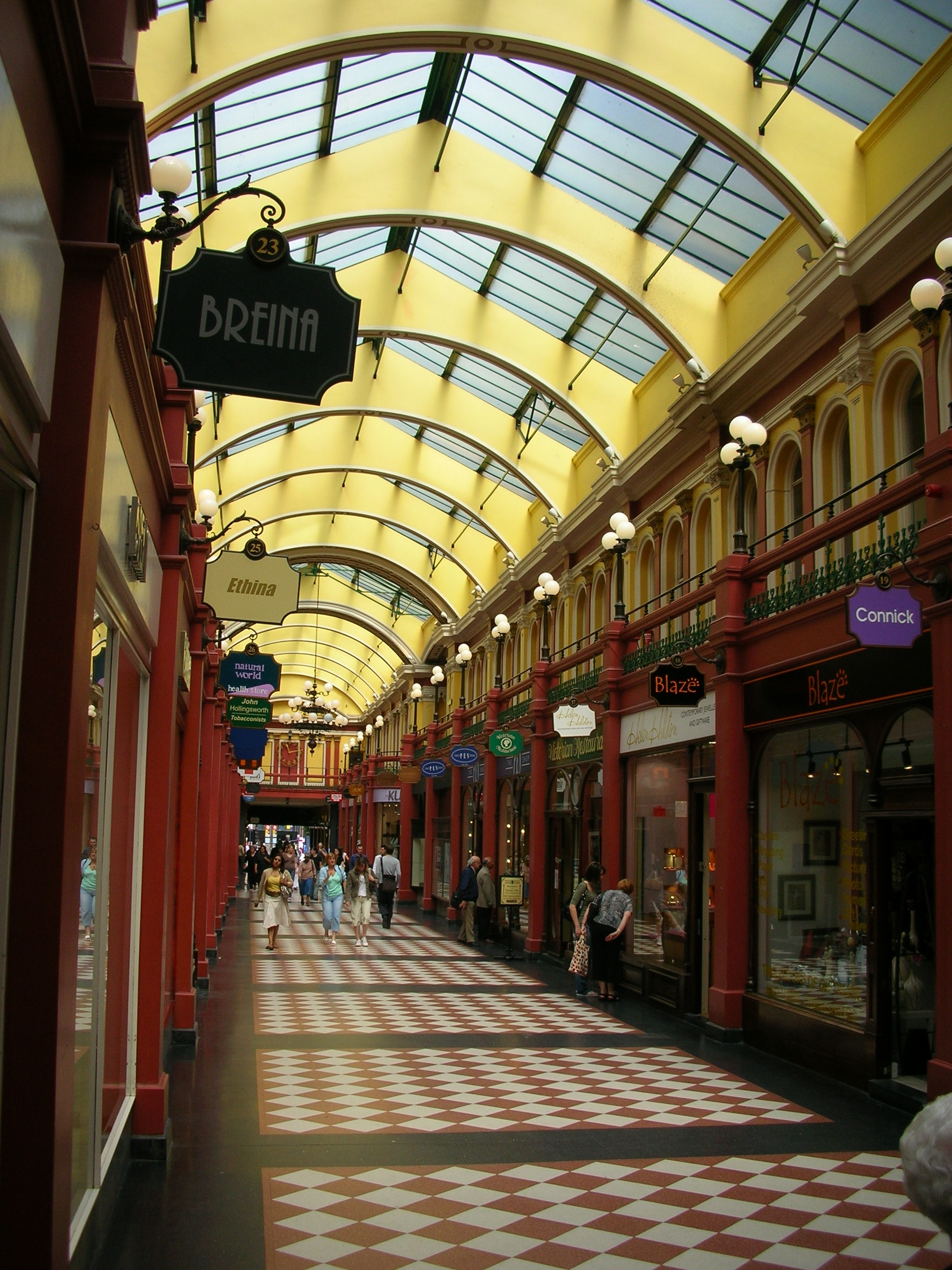
Great Western Arcade

The Great Western Arcade (grid reference SP070871) is a covered Grade II listed Victorian shopping arcade lying between Colmore Row and Temple Row in Birmingham City Centre, England.

It was built (1875-6) over the Great Western Railway line cutting at the London end of Snow Hill station. The cutting was covered in 1874. Originally the broad gauge Paddington line ran through a tunnel which stopped at Temple Row and then an open cutting to Snow Hill station. The cutting was roofed over in 1874 and the Great Western Arcade built on top, the line of the new 'tunnel' being offset slightly to the north of the centre of the arcade. The extended tunnel has a length of 596 yards (545 m). The arcade was designed by W. H. Ward of Paradise Street, Birmingham.

The arcade has entrances at each end: the one at Temple Row is ornate, unlike the modern reworking at Colmore Row, opposite the entrance to the station. The arcade's roof was originally a glazed semi-circular barrel vault with a glazed central dome, similar to that of the Gallerio Vittoria Emmanuele in Milan which was constructed at the same time. It was destroyed during World War II and has been replaced. The arcade, containing shops on both sides, has a clock which strikes the quarters on a set of five exposed bells.

== Sources ==
- Pevsner Architectural Guides - Birmingham, Andy Foster, 2005, ISBN 0-300-10731-5
- Birmingham (City Building Series), Douglas Hickman, 1970, Studio Vista Limited
- Salute to Snow Hill: The Rise and Fall of Birmingham's Snow Hill Railway Station 1852 - 1977, Harrison, Derek, 1978, 1983, Birmingham: Barbryn Press, ISBN 0-906160-00-6
