= Birmingham Snow Hill railway station =

Railway station in Birmingham, England

Birmingham Snow Hill
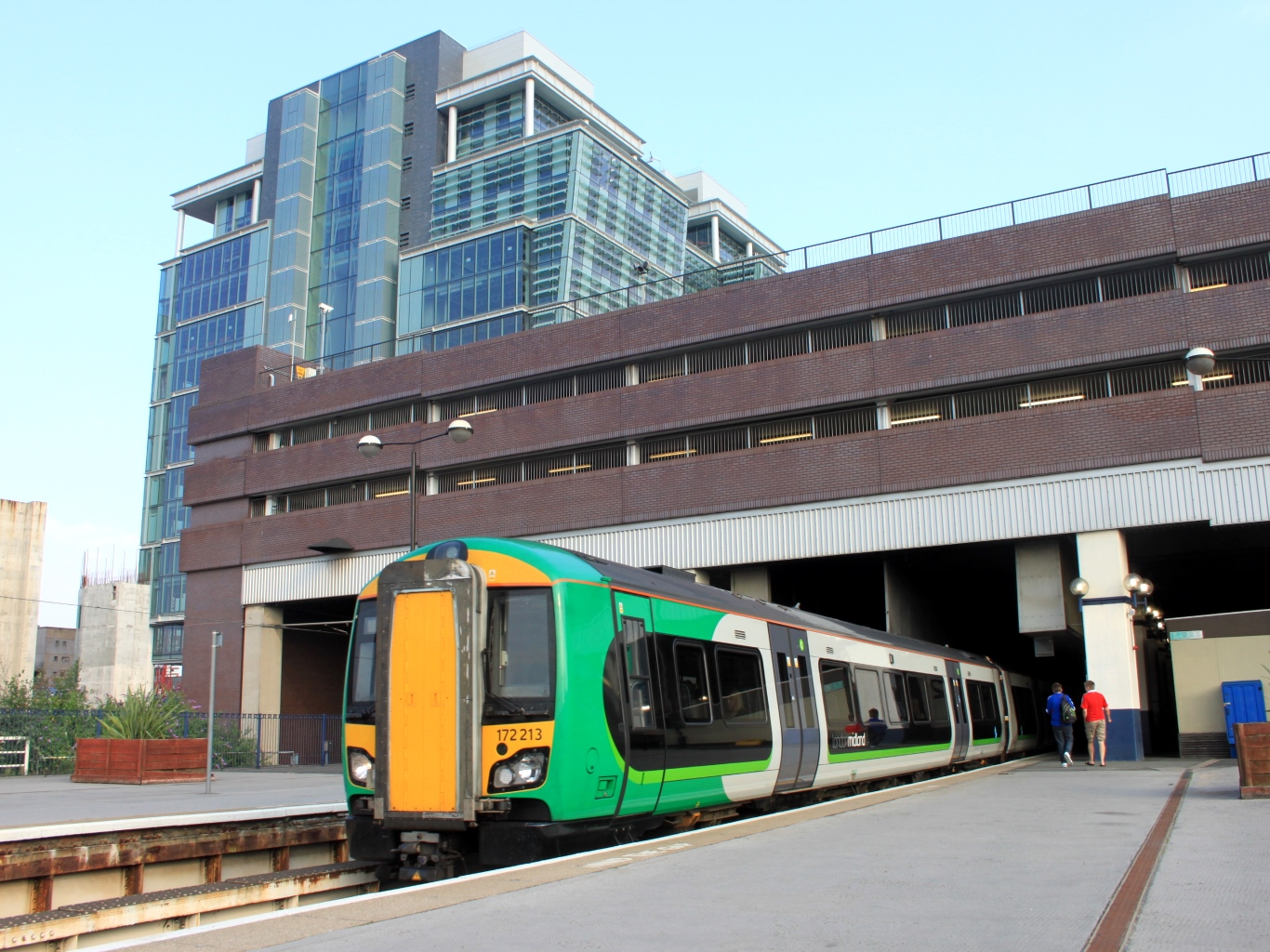
- Birmingham Snow Hill station

General information
- Location: Colmore Row, Birmingham; England
- Coordinates: 52.483°N 1.899°W
- Grid reference: SP069873
- Manager: West Midlands Trains
- Transit authority: Transport for West Midlands
- Platforms: 3 (4th under construction)

Other information
- Station code: BSW
- Fare zone: 1
- Classification: DfT category C1

History
- Original company: Birmingham and Oxford Junction Railway
- Pre-grouping: Great Western Railway
- Post-grouping: Great Western Railway

Key dates
- 1 October 1852: Opened as Birmingham
- February 1858: Renamed Birmingham Snow Hill
- 1871: Rebuilt
- 1906–1912: Rebuilt
- 6 March 1972: Closed
- 5 October 1987: Rebuilt and reopened
- 31 May 1999: Midland Metro stop opened
- 24 October 2015: Midland Metro stop closed

Passengers
- 2021/22: ▲2.311 million
- Interchange: ▲91,146
- 2022/23: ▲2.718 million
- Interchange: ▲0.176 million
- 2023/24: ▲2.851 million
- Interchange: ▲0.269 million
- 2024/25: ▲3.154 million
- Interchange: ▲0.301 million
- 2024/25: ▲3.541 million
- Interchange: ▲0.327 million
Location
Notes
- Passenger statistics from the Office of Rail and Road

Birmingham Snow Hill, also known as Snow Hill station, is a railway station in Birmingham City Centre, England. It is one of the three main city-centre stations in Birmingham, along with Birmingham New Street and Birmingham Moor Street.

Snow Hill was once the main Birmingham station of the Great Western Railway, at its height, it rivalled New Street station with services to destinations including London Paddington, Wolverhampton Low Level, Birkenhead Woodside, Wales and South West England. The station has been rebuilt several times since the first version, a temporary wooden structure, was opened in 1852; it was rebuilt as a permanent station in 1871 and then rebuilt again on a much grander scale during 1906–1912. The electrification of the main line from London to New Street in the 1960s saw New Street favoured over Snow Hill, most of whose services were withdrawn in the late 1960s. This led to the station's eventual closure in 1972 and its demolition five years later. After fifteen years of the site's use as a car park, a new Snow Hill station, the present incarnation, opened in 1987.

Today, most of the trains using Snow Hill are local services on the Snow Hill Lines, operated by West Midlands Railway, serving Worcester Shrub Hill, Kidderminster, Stourbridge Junction, Stratford-upon-Avon and Solihull. The only long-distance service using Snow Hill, operated by Chiltern Railways via the Chiltern Main Line, serves London Marylebone.

The present station has three platforms for National Rail trains. When it reopened in 1987, it had four, but one was converted in 1999 for use as a terminus for Midland Metro trams from Wolverhampton. This terminus closed in October 2015, in order for the extension of the metro through Birmingham city centre via a dedicated embankment alongside the station, which included a new through stop serving Snow Hill. The fourth platform is due to be returned to heavy rail use in 2026.

== History ==
=== Early history ===
The site of the station was formerly occupied by Oppenheim's Glassworks. This was demolished, but many parts of the building and machinery are believed to be buried underneath the station and car park, and during recent development work alongside the station the area was designated as a site of archaeological importance by Birmingham City Council.

The station was authorised by the Great Western Railway, Birmingham Station, Act 1851 (14 & 15 Vict. c. lxxxi) and opened in 1852 on the Great Western Railway (GWR) main line from London Paddington to Wolverhampton Low Level and Birkenhead Woodside. Originally called Birmingham Station, its name was changed to Great Charles Street station, and then Livery Street Station. It was finally renamed Snow Hill in 1858, and the Great Western Hotel was added in 1863.

Great Western Railway, Birmingham Station, Act 1851
- Act of Parliament
- Parliament of the United Kingdom
- Long title: An Act for enabling the Great Western Railway Company to construct a Station and Works at Aston-Juxta-Birmingham.
- Citation: 14 & 15 Vict. c. lxxxi

Dates
- Royal assent: 24 July 1851

Text of statute as originally enacted

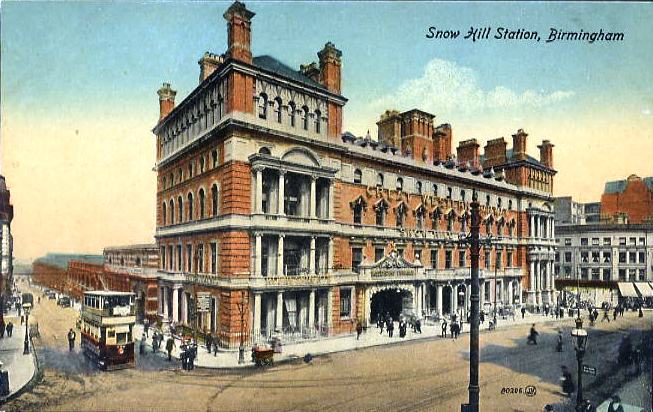
The facade of the original Snow Hill on Colmore Row

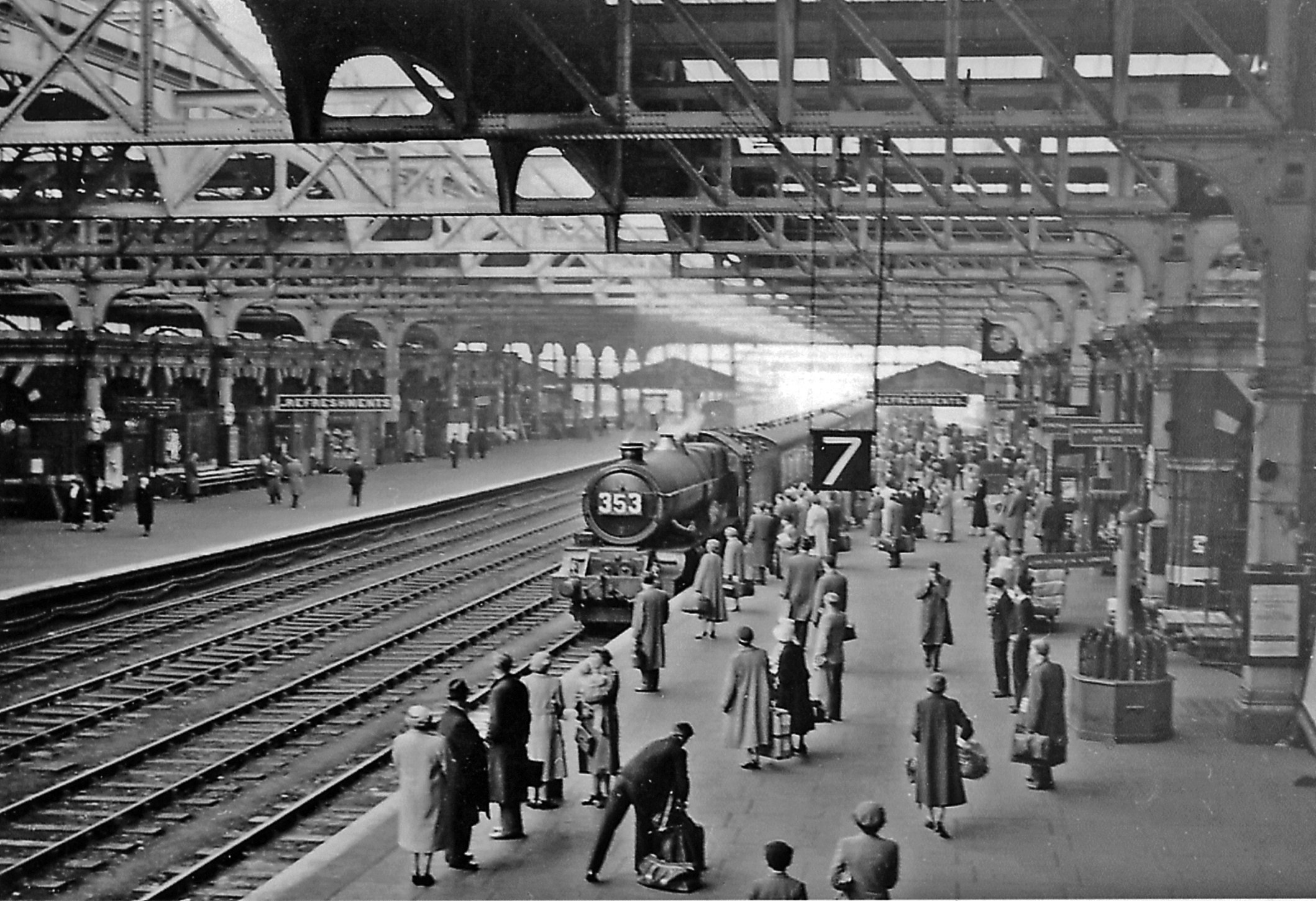
Old Snow Hill station in 1957.

It was not originally intended to be the main station, but the railway was prevented from reaching its preferred terminus at Curzon Street; London and North Western Railway's engineer Robert Stephenson and solicitor Samuel Carter argued in Parliament that there would be safety risks in rival companies sharing the congested connection into their station. The original station at Snow Hill was a simple temporary wooden structure, consisting of a large wooden shed covering the platforms. In 1871 it was rebuilt, and replaced with a permanent structure. The 1871 station had two through platforms, and bay platforms at the Wolverhampton end, covered by an arched roof. Access to the station was from the side, in Livery Street. Trains from the south arrived through Snow Hill Tunnel, built by the cut-and-cover method, and in a cutting from Temple Row to Snow Hill. The cutting was roofed over in 1872 and the Great Western Arcade built on top.

To cope with expanding traffic, Snow Hill station was again rebuilt, on a much larger scale, between 1906 and 1912. This building was intended to compete with New Street, containing facilities, such as a large booking hall with an arched glass roof, and lavish waiting rooms with oak bars. The main platform area was covered by a glass and steel overall roof. It consisted of two large Island platforms, giving four through platform faces, and four bay platforms for terminating trains at the northern end. The through platforms were long enough to accommodate two trains at a time, and scissors crossings allowed trains to pull in front, or out from behind of other trains stood in a platform, effectively creating a 12 platform station. The line north from Snow Hill towards Hockley was quadrupled at the same time, however the cost of widening the twin track Snow Hill tunnel at the southern end was considered prohibitive. There was not enough capacity through the tunnel to accommodate all of the services, and so, as a solution, Birmingham Moor Street was built as an "overflow" station at the opposite end of the tunnel to take terminating local trains from Leamington Spa and Stratford-upon-Avon. The Great Western Hotel was closed at the same time (as hotel guests complained of being kept awake by goods trains running underneath) and converted into railway offices, and a passenger entrance was provided on Colmore Row, which became the station's main entrance.

==== Historic services ====
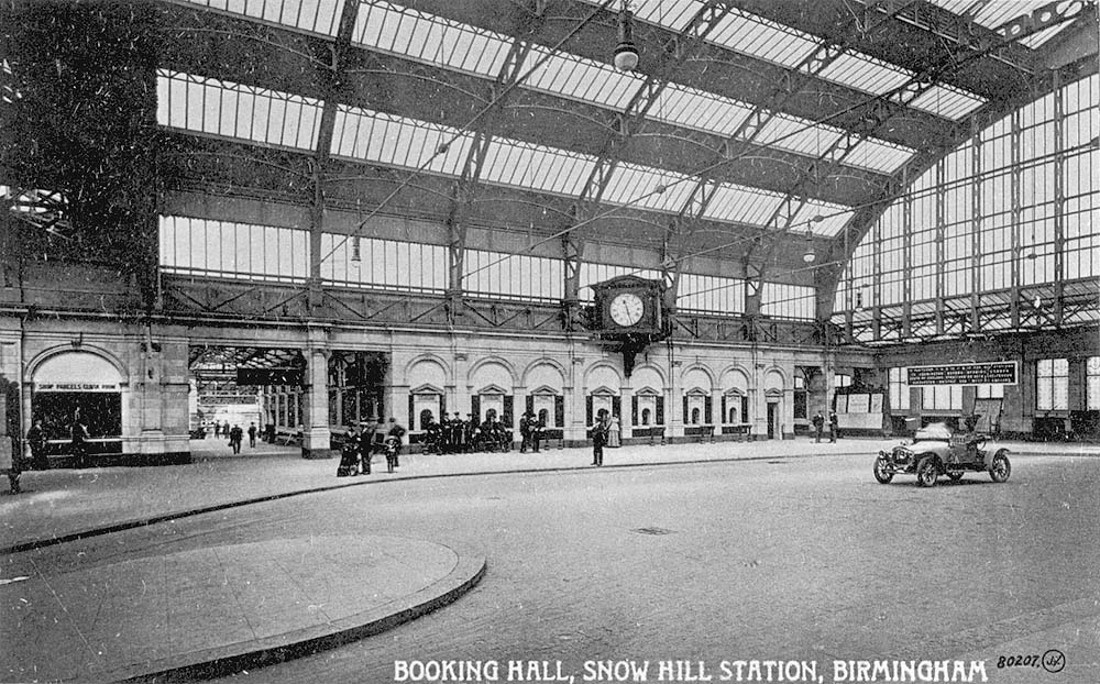
The old station's arched glass booking hall in 1914.

At its height, many services that now run into New Street station ran into Snow Hill, along with some that no longer operate. They included:

- London Paddington – service transferred to New Street in 1967, and later abandoned altogether. The London service was restored in the early 1990s, but now to London Marylebone - making this Snow Hill's only long-distance service.
- Wolverhampton Low Level, and Dudley – The branch from Snow Hill to Dudley was closed in 1964, and the service to Wolverhampton Low Level was one of the last to survive, ending in 1972. A Snow Hill-Wolverhampton service was resumed in 1999, when the Midland Metro tram line, which now runs along the former trackbed to Wolverhampton, was opened, although this does not serve the former Low Level station, instead running on-street to a terminus at Wolverhampton St George's.
- Birkenhead Woodside via Wolverhampton, Shrewsbury, Wrexham and Chester – this was on the old GWR route from London Paddington. British Railways ended this service before closing Snow Hill in 1967.
- Mid Wales via Shrewsbury – these trains now run into New Street (although it is now possible to join a train to Smethwick Galton Bridge and change onto a Transport for Wales service to these destinations).
- Hereford via Stourbridge Junction and Worcester Foregate Street; - the Snow Hill-Worcester-Hereford services were diverted to New Street in 1967, in 1995 services were resumed between Snow Hill, Stourbridge and Worcester.
- Cardiff via Stratford upon Avon – In 1908 the North Warwickshire Line route via Stratford and Cheltenham Spa Malvern Road was opened, and became the principal GWR route between Birmingham and the South West and South Wales. A pioneering diesel railcar service with a buffet commenced running in July 1934 between Snow Hill and Cardiff, running non-stop through Stratford, with only two stops at Gloucester and Newport. This was the first long-distance diesel express service in Britain. The railcar service ran until 1946, when it was replaced with a conventional steam service, which continued until it was diverted via New Street in 1962.
- Bristol Temple Meads, Exeter St Davids, Plymouth and Penzance via Stratford-upon-Avon – These services were diverted via New Street and Bromsgrove in 1962. British Railways closed the line between Stratford and Cheltenham in 1976.
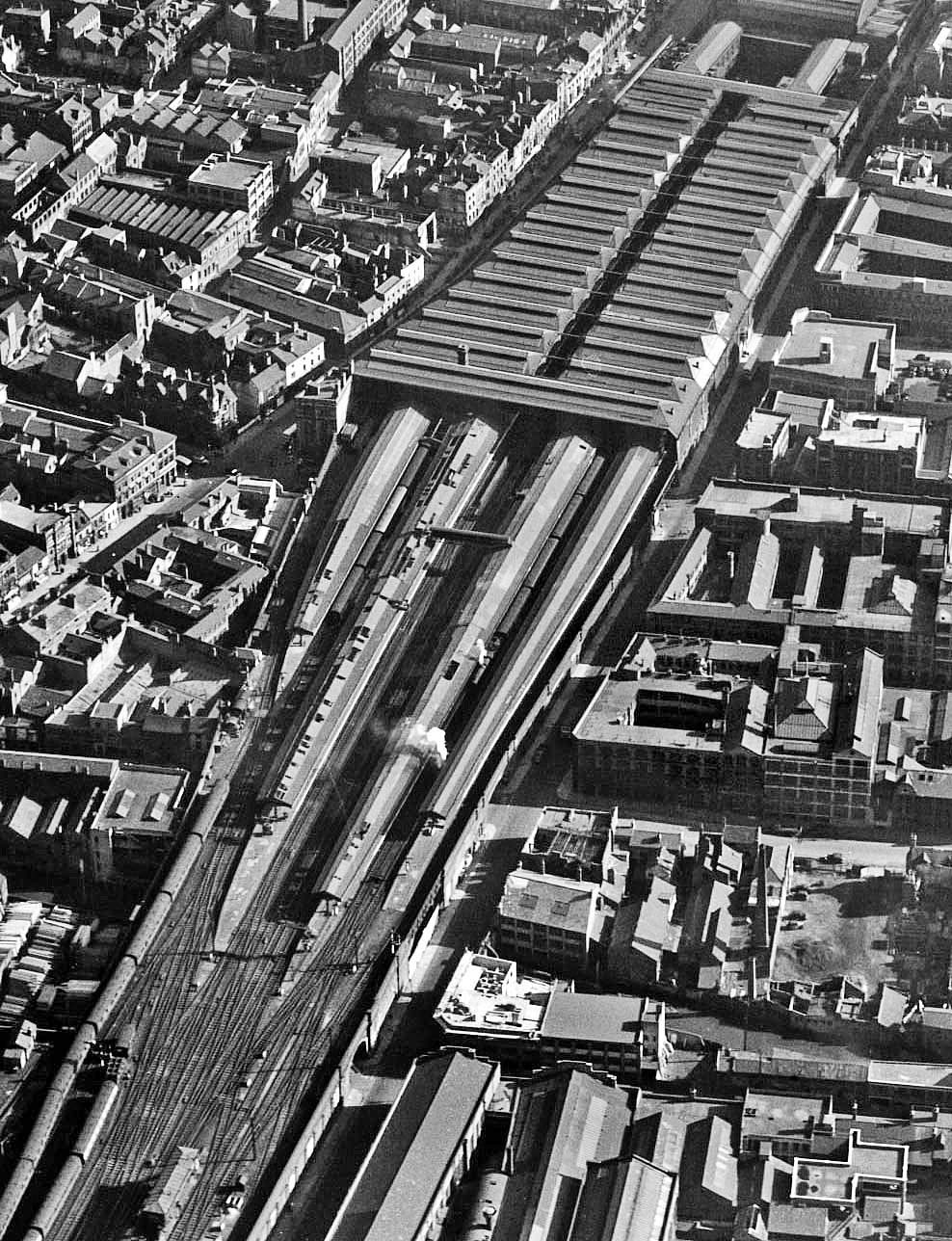
Aerial photograph of Snow Hill station from 1948

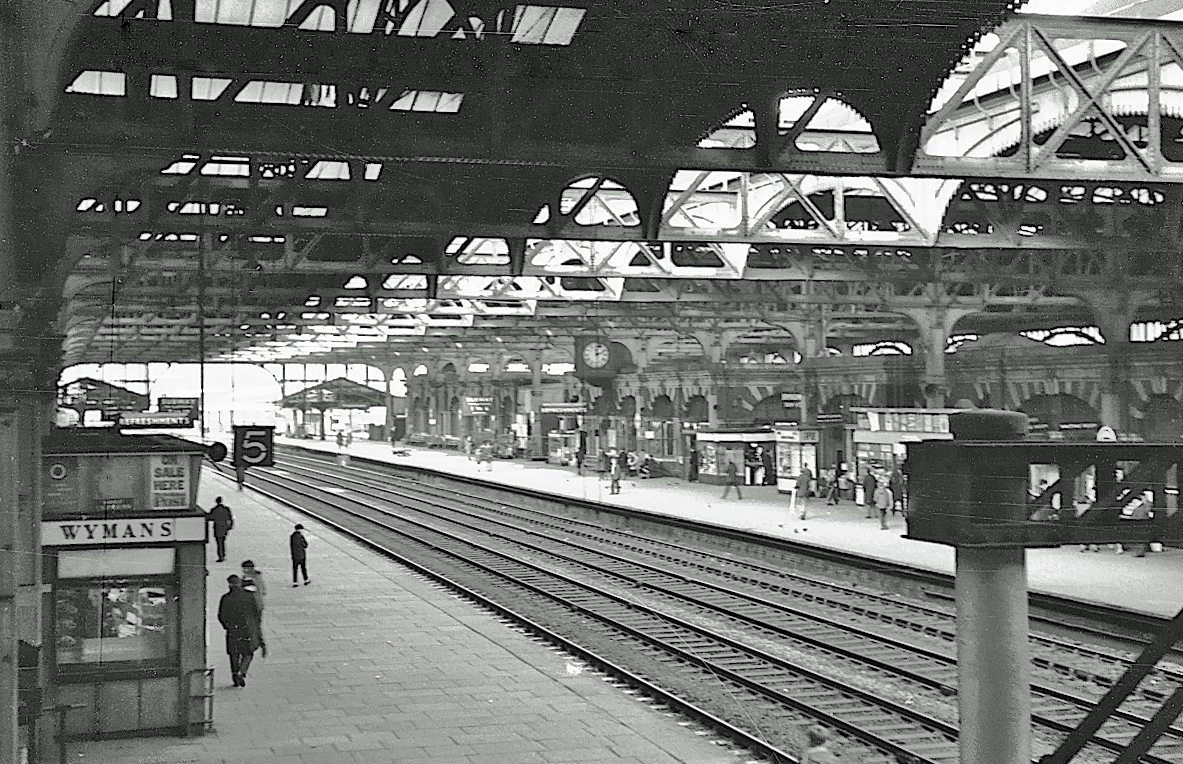
Main through platforms, looking north at Snow Hill in 1967.

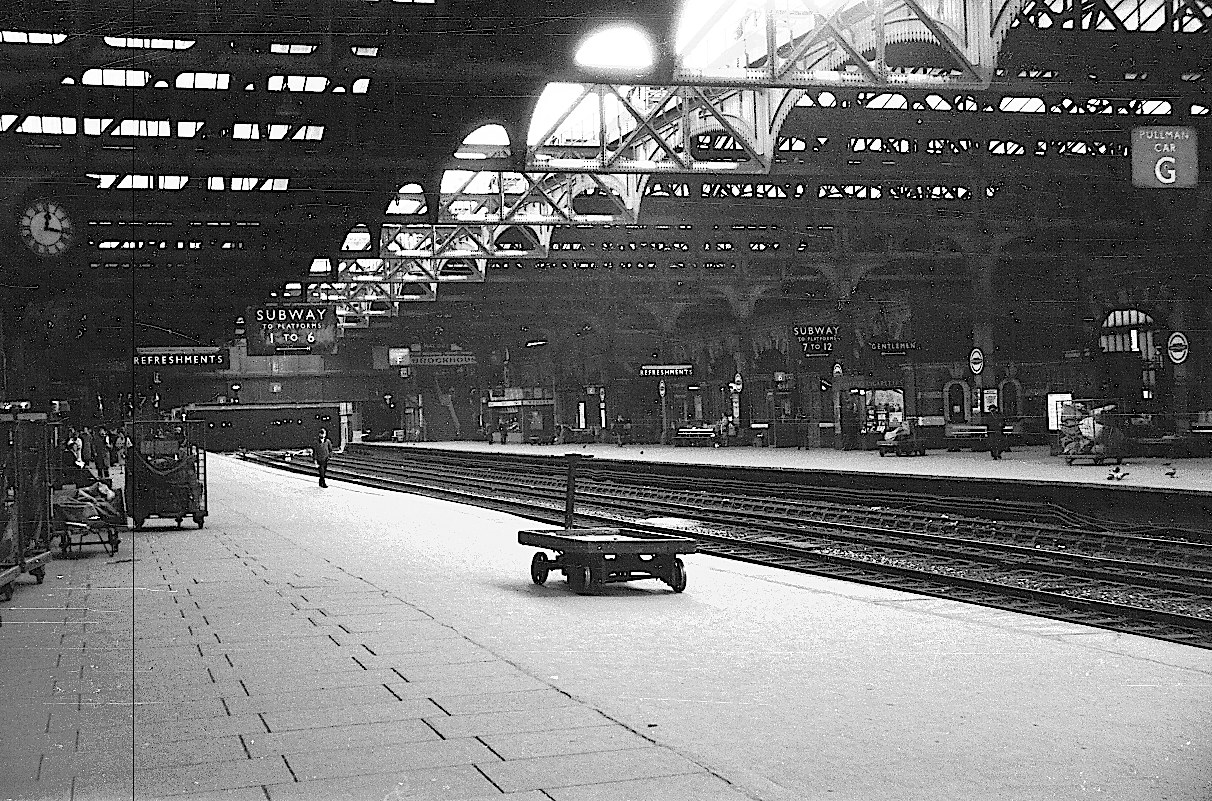
Main through platforms, looking south towards Snow Hill tunnel in 1967.

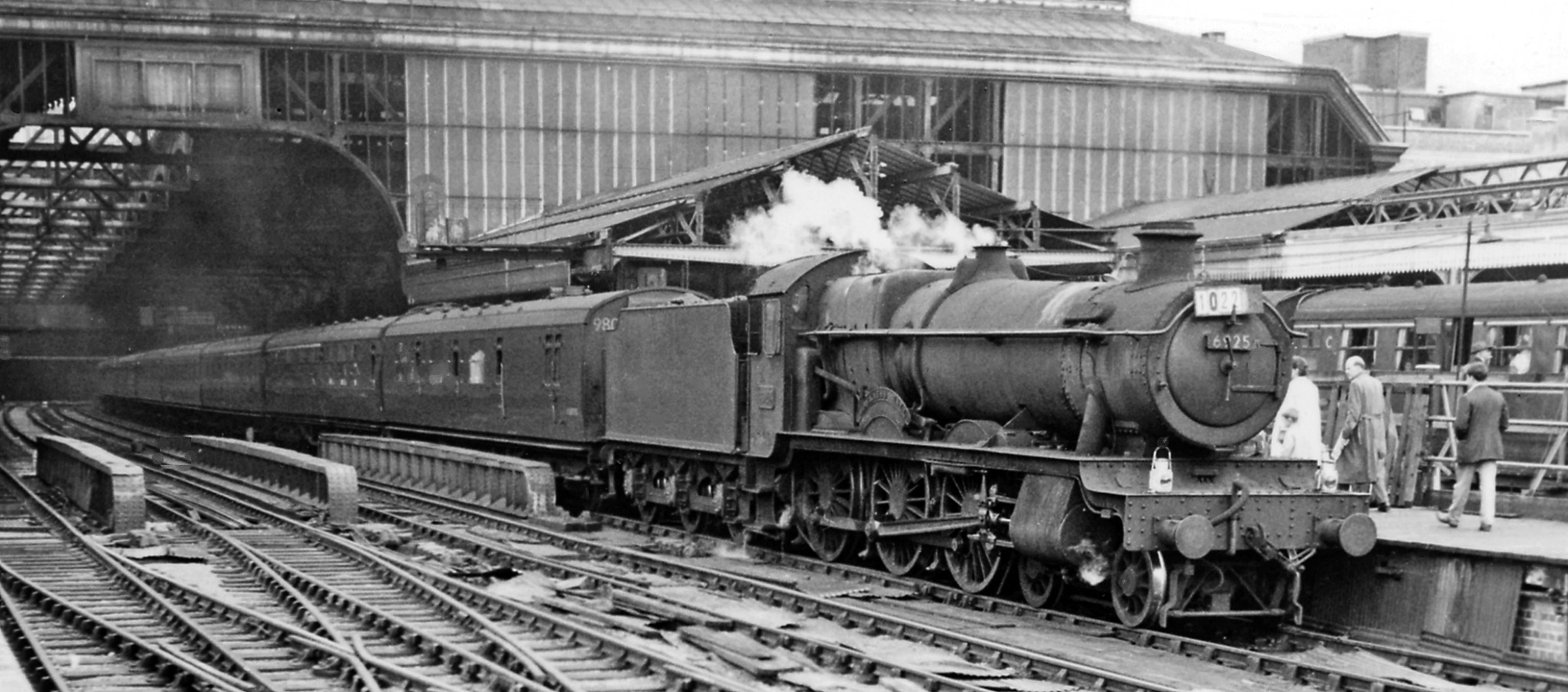
An express calling at Snow Hill in 1964.

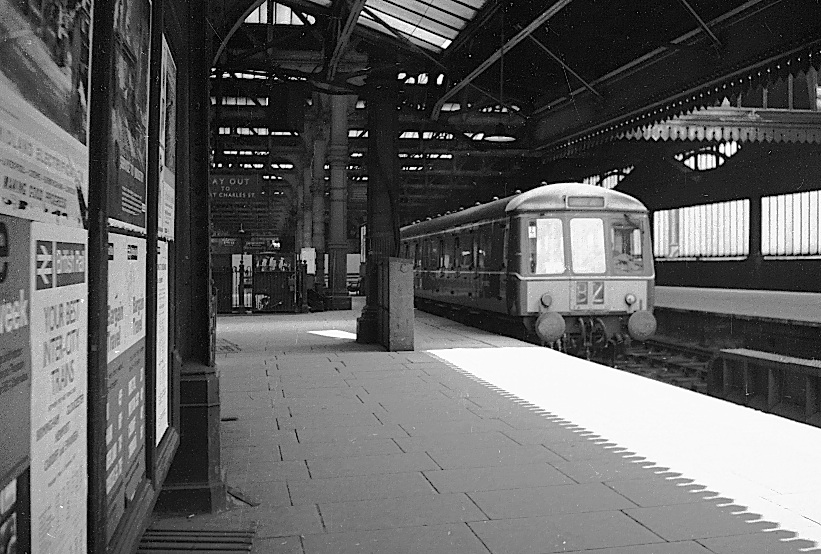
A DMU at one of the station's northern bay platforms (the last platforms to be used) in c. 1967.

=== Closure ===
As late as the mid-1960s Snow Hill was still a major station; in 1964 it handled 7.5 million passengers, compared to 10.2 million at New Street. However the electrification of the rival West Coast Main Line into New Street, meant that British Railways decided to concentrate all services into Birmingham into one station, and Snow Hill was seen as being an unnecessary duplication. In 1966 the decision was taken to end main line services through Snow Hill once electrification of the WCML was complete, and divert most of its remaining services through New Street.

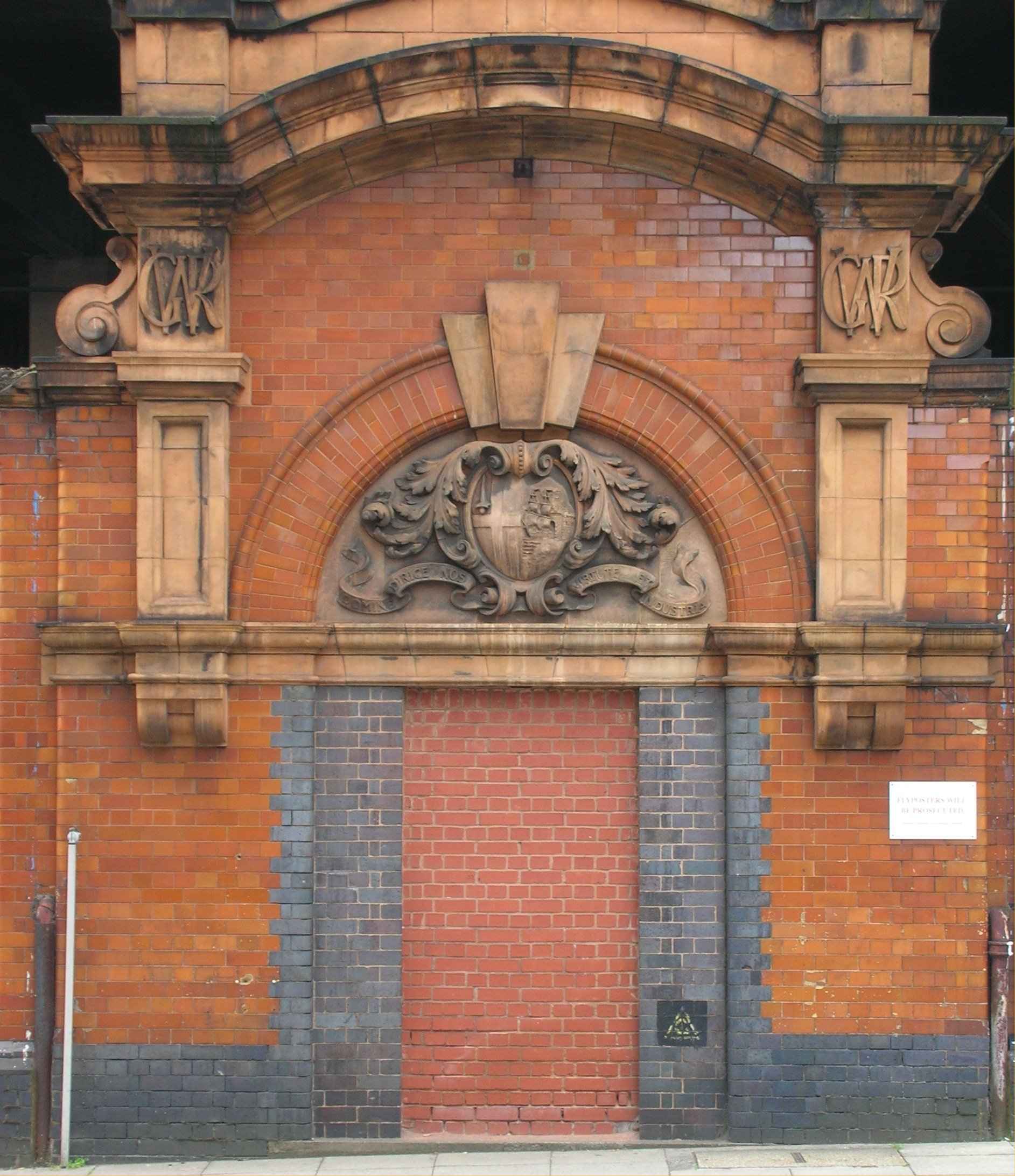
An original entrance in Livery Street

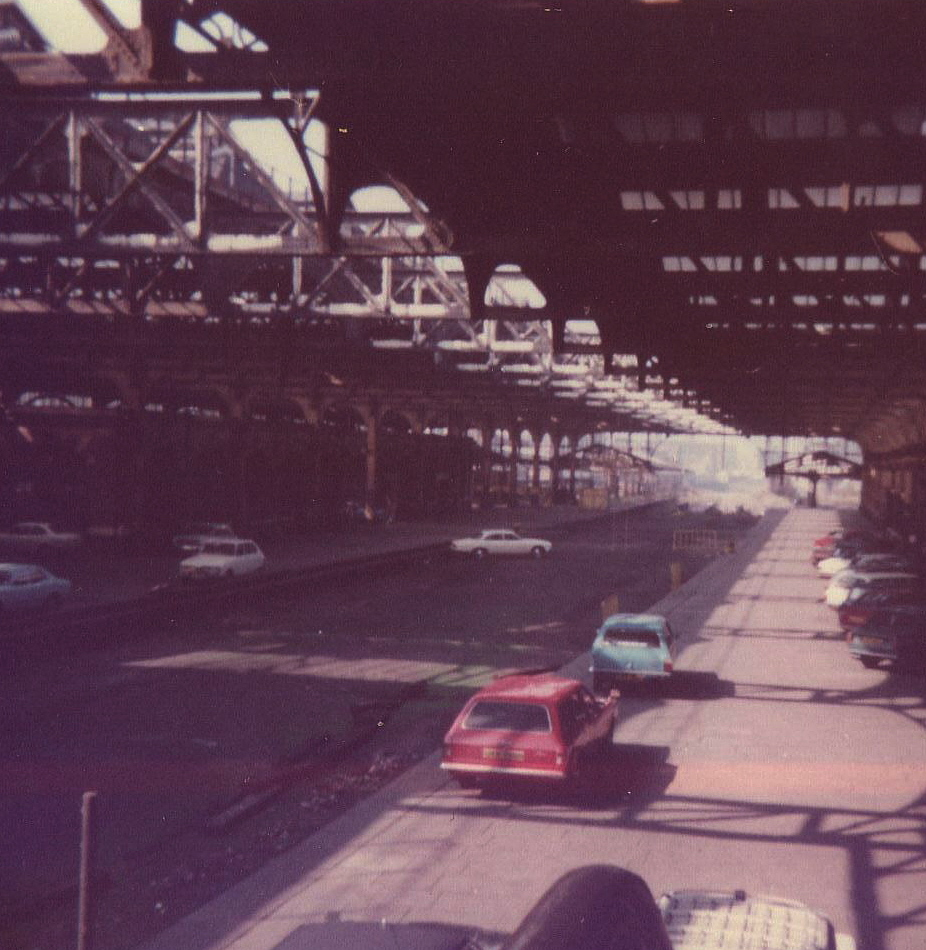
Snow Hill in derelict condition being used as a car park in 1977, shortly before demolition.

Long-distance services through Snow Hill ceased in March 1967. Snow Hill tunnel closed to all traffic the following year, with the last train running on 2 March 1968. Local trains from Leamington Spa and Stratford upon Avon were then terminated at Moor Street. Services to London, the West Country, Stourbridge and Shrewsbury were diverted to New Street, and the branch to Dudley was closed. All that was left was a shuttle service of four trains per day using Class 122 railcars to Langley Green, along with six daily stopping services to Wolverhampton Low Level. With this, as most passenger facilities in the station were withdrawn and virtually the entire site became disused save for one bay platform, Snow Hill then became known as "the largest unstaffed railway halt in the country". In March 1972 these last services were withdrawn and the station closed entirely, along with the lines through to Smethwick and Wolverhampton, with the exception of a single line from Smethwick West for Coopers Scrap Metal Works in Handsworth (the works is still in operation to this day).

Following closure, the derelict station was used for several years as a car park. It enjoyed a brief moment of fame in 1976 when it was the setting for a fight scene in the locally set BBC TV drama series Gangsters. However, despite a public outcry, the Snow Hill building was not preserved. The Colmore Row façade was demolished in 1969, and the rest of the station largely demolished in 1977, when the dangerous state of the building was revealed. The ironwork of the station roof was badly corroded in several places, and the unstable ground and foundations on which the station had been built were causing it to slide downhill. A few items, including the original gates and booking hall sign, were saved and later used in the Moor Street restoration.

The closure was decided by the London Midland region of British Railways, to whom the station and lines had been transferred to from the Western Region in 1963. The decision was actually against the recommendation of the Beeching report, which highlighted the route through Snow Hill and Wolverhampton Low Level as an important one to stay open, however the London Midland region did not want to have a line duplicate to their own from New Street to Wolverhampton High Level. The reason the station was re-opened so soon after its closure was because the West Midlands Passenger Transport Executive (now Transport for West Midlands) had been formed a few years earlier, but it did not have the necessary powers to prevent the station's closure. As soon as the WMPTE gained these powers, they set to work re-opening Snow Hill and managed to safeguard the trackbed to Wolverhampton Low Level for a possible future re-opening: this would become the West Midlands Metro line in 1999.

=== Rebirth ===
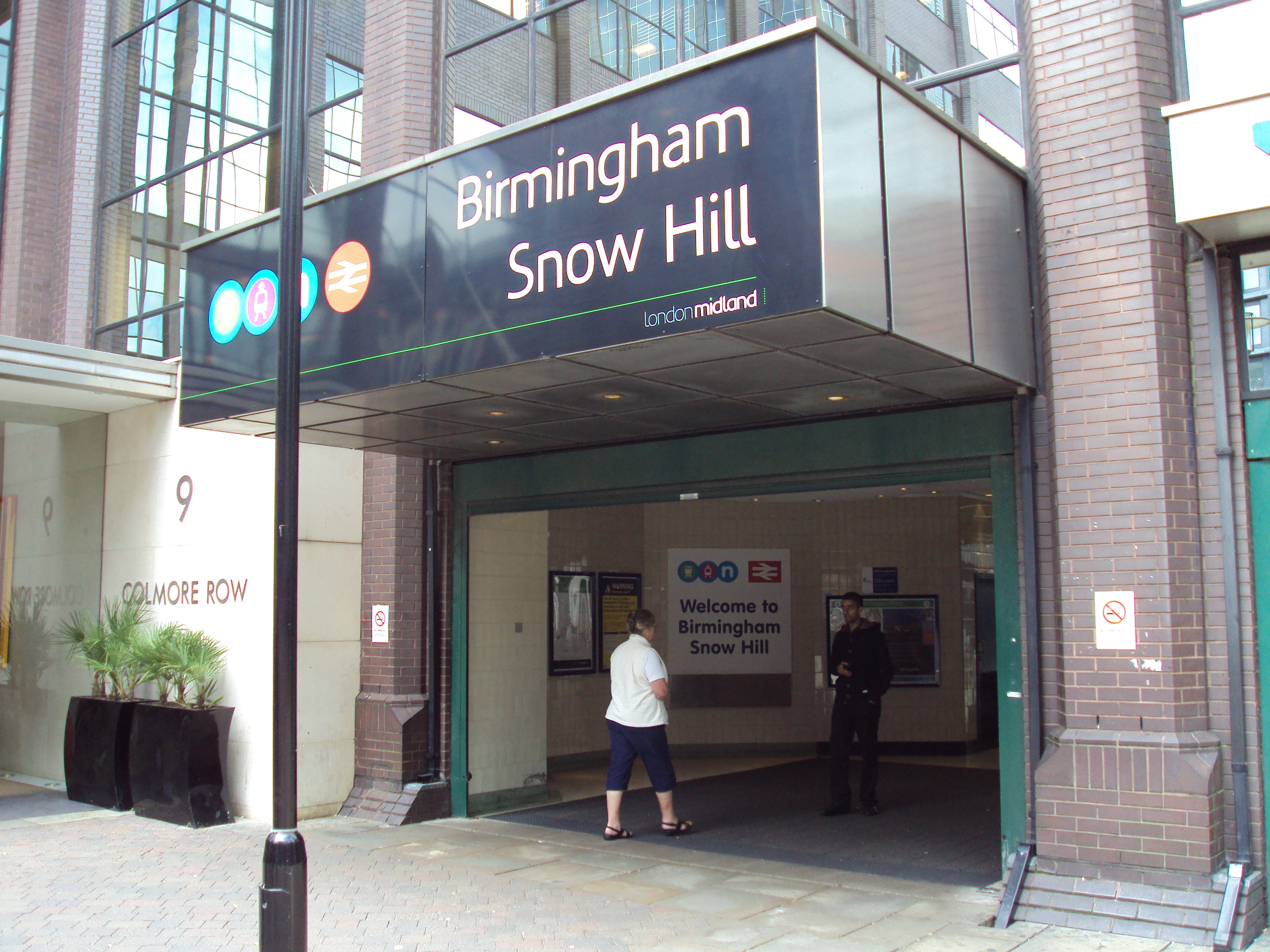
Colmore Row entrance

The West Midlands Passenger Transport Authority had adopted a policy to restore cross-city rail services through Snow Hill since the 1970s, a project which was completed in two phases.

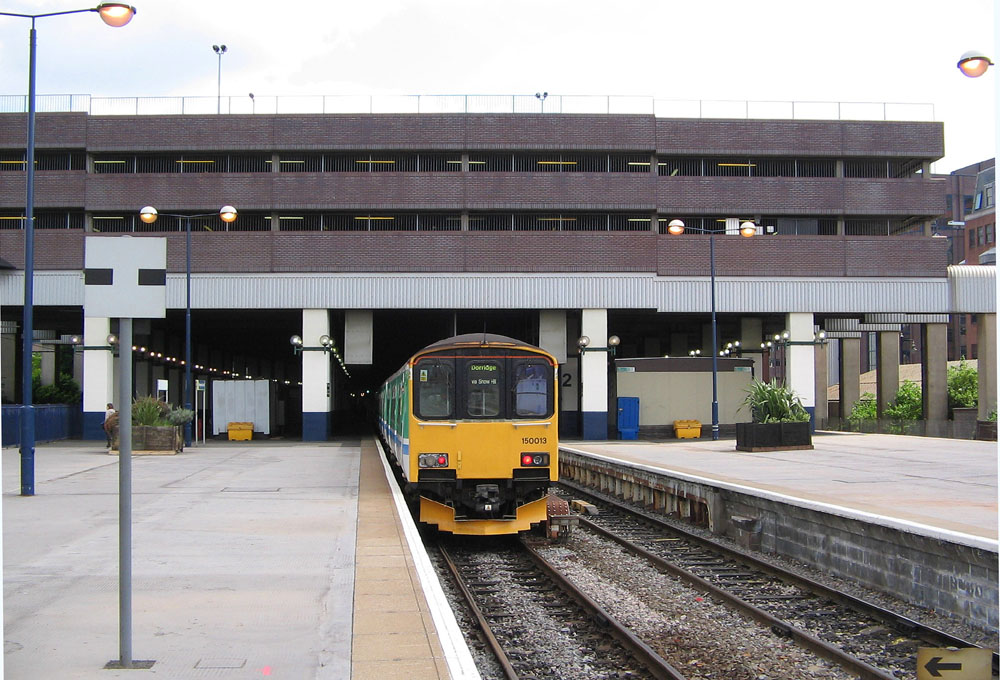
A Class 150 entering the rebuilt Snow Hill from the north in 2006.

The first phase was completed on 5 October 1987, when the newly rebuilt station opened for services to the south, along with Snow Hill tunnel. The new station is on a smaller scale than its Edwardian predecessor, with just two island platforms, giving four platform faces. The station's architecture is functional rather than ornate. A multi-storey car park stands over the main platform area, meaning artificial lighting is required on the platforms. Like its predecessor, the main entrance is on Colmore Row. Some parts of the original station are still visible (notably the now-sealed entrance, with GWR crest, in Livery Street).

Initially only local stopping services to Leamington Spa and Stratford-upon-Avon used the new station. Services at Moor Street, where these services had previously terminated, were switched from the former terminal platforms, which then closed, on to two newly built through platforms, at the southern mouth of Snow Hill tunnel, making it a through station for the first time.

In May 1993 Network SouthEast reintroduced limited-stop services to London, initially on a two-hourly frequency, routed to Marylebone instead of the pre-closure destination of Paddington. The service proved popular and was increased to an hourly frequency the following year. Chiltern Railways took over the service after privatisation.

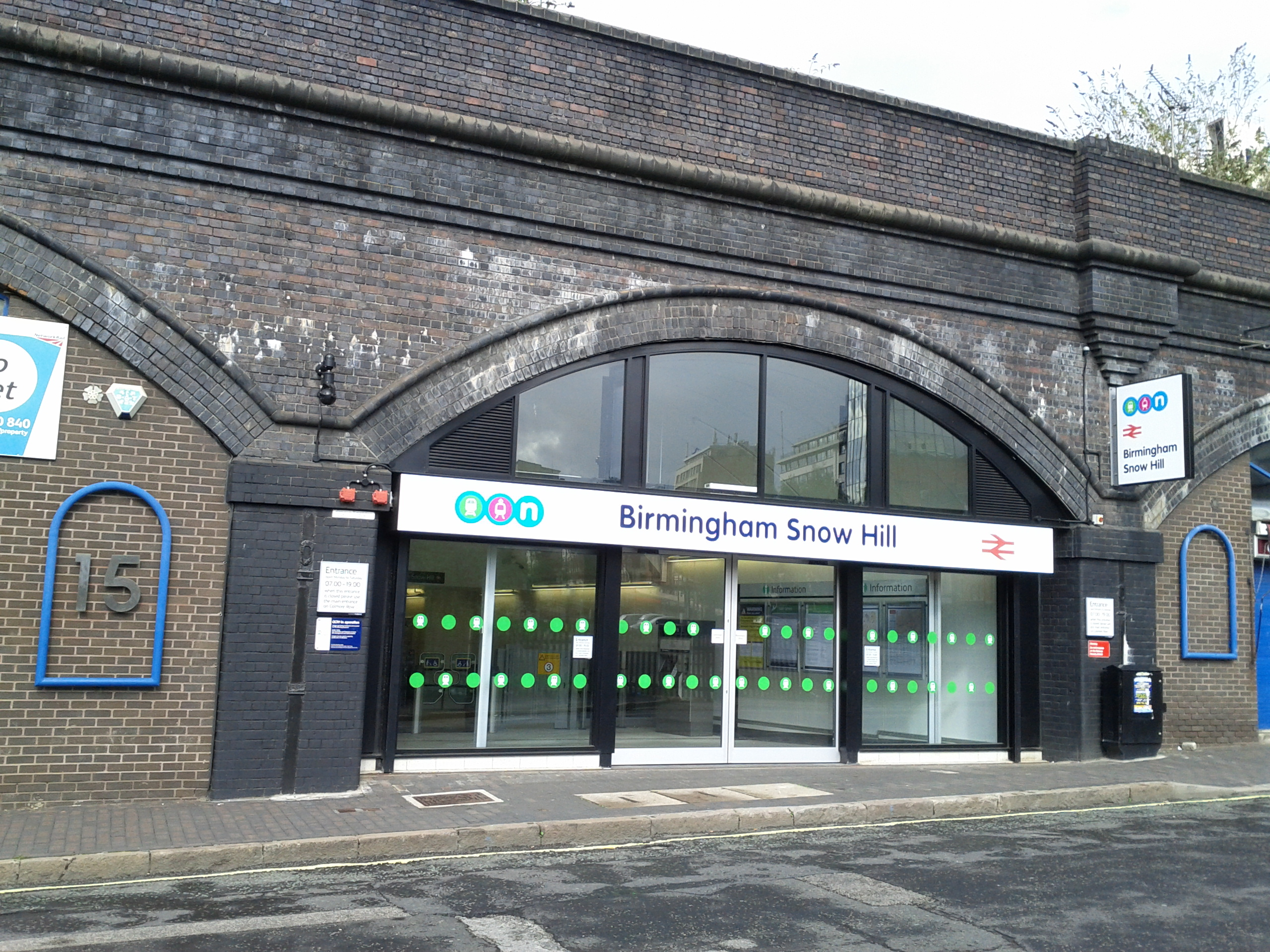
Livery Street entrance

The second phase of the Snow Hill reopening project was completed on 24 September 1995, when the Birmingham to Worcester via Kidderminster Line was reopened to Snow Hill. This allowed the resumption of services to Worcester Shrub Hill via Stourbridge Junction and Kidderminster. The "Jewellery Line" project involved reopening the line between Smethwick West and Snow Hill, along with three new stations (Jewellery Quarter, The Hawthorns and Smethwick Galton Bridge).

In 1999, the line to Wolverhampton was reopened as a light rail (tram) line, the Midland Metro.

Work began on a new entrance on Livery Street in 2005, to serve the lower Snow Hill and Jewellery Quarter part of the city centre, but it did not open until March 2011. It had a projected cost of £9.94 million, but due to Centro's failure to apply for planning permission, and severe technical difficulties, the cost rose to at least £17 million. Although construction and interior finishing were largely complete by December 2010, legal disputes between London Midland, Network Rail and Centro caused delay to the opening of the entrance by over a year.

The former tram terminus platform is intended to be returned for use for mainline trains as a fourth platform. However as of September 2020, little work had been conducted other than disconnecting and partial lifting of the former tram line. The fourth platform is now expected to be completed during 2026.

==== Station cat memorial ====
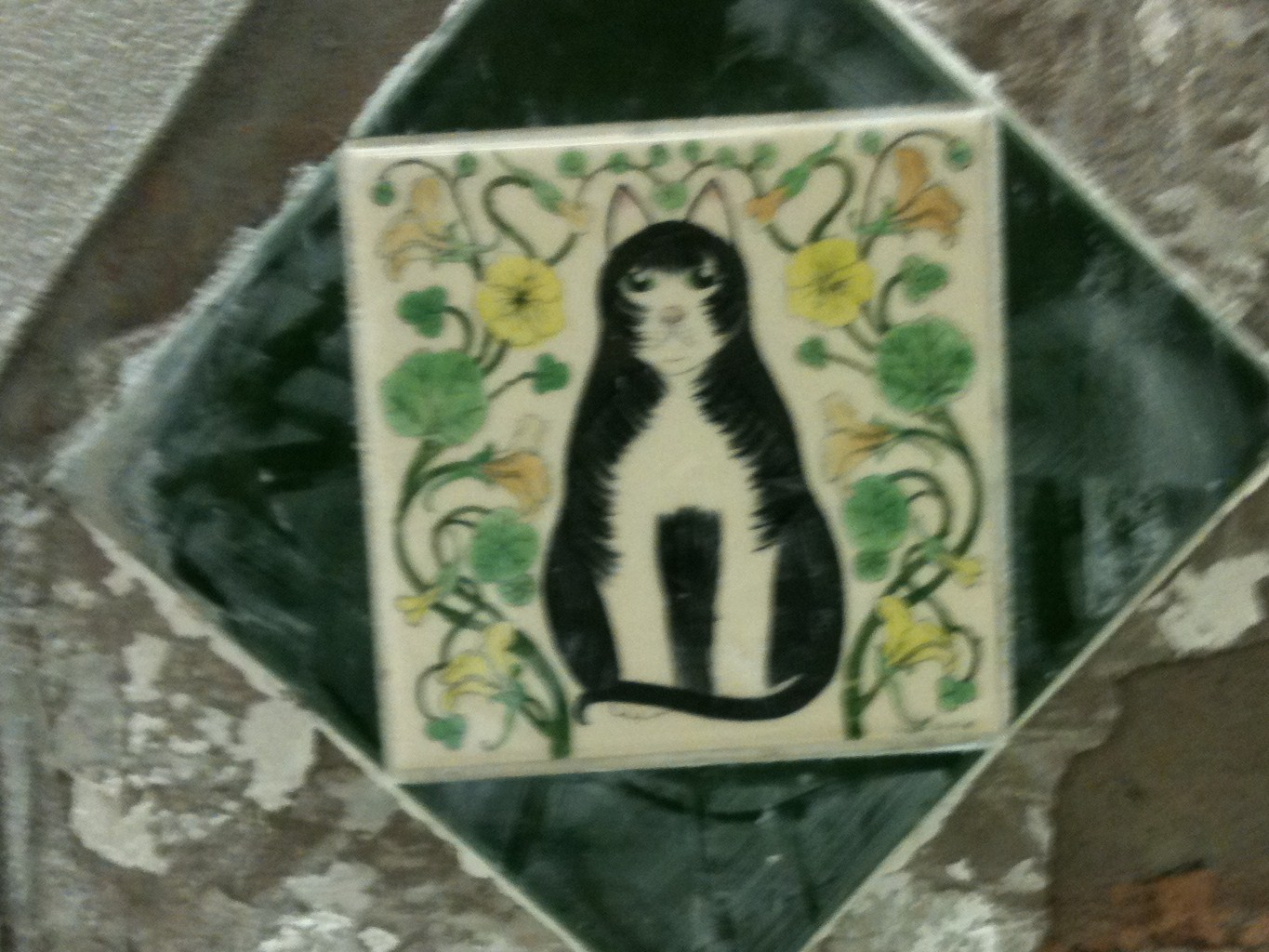
Station Cat Memorial tile

In remembrance of a cat kept at the station before its closure, a memorial tile was installed during the works for the reopening. During later refurbishment works in 2014 care was taken to protect it.

== Services ==
The station is managed by West Midlands Trains and services are provided by West Midlands Trains and Chiltern Railways. There is a small set of sidings at the Hockley end of the station, which can be reached from Platform 1 only. All platforms can be used in either direction; generally platforms 1 or 2 are used for trains heading north, platform 2 is used for trains terminating at the station and platform 3 is used for trains going south.

Occasional steam-hauled special trains use the station.

=== Chiltern Railways ===
Snow Hill is served by Chiltern Railway services to and from London Marylebone, and is the northern terminus of the Chiltern Mainline from London Marylebone.

The typical Chiltern service pattern is as follows:

- 1 tp2h off-peak/ 1 train per hour (tph) in peak periods to London Marylebone via Solihull, Dorridge, Warwick, Leamington Spa, Banbury and High Wycombe.
- The first London-bound service begins at Stourbridge Junction.
- 3 tpd extend northwards in the evening peak to Stourbridge Junction, via Smethwick Galton Bridge and Rowley Regis.
- 1 tpd terminates short of London Marylebone at Leamington Spa.
- The last two London-bound services of the day terminate at Banbury.

=== West Midlands Railway ===
Local services from Snow Hill, like most local services in the West Midlands, are supported by Transport for West Midlands. They are operated by West Midlands Trains using the West Midlands Railway brand.

There are four West Midlands Railway trains per hour (tph) serving Snow Hill in each direction, running as follows:

Eastbound:

- 2 trains per hour to Whitlocks End via Shirley
  - of which one continues to Stratford-upon-Avon via the North Warwickshire Line.
- 2 trains per hour to Dorridge via Solihull
  - of which one continues to Stratford-upon-Avon via Lapworth
  - Two evening weekday West Midlands Railway services continue to Leamington Spa.

Westbound:

- 4 trains per hour to Kidderminster via Smethwick Galton Bridge and Stourbridge Junction:
  - of which two continue to Worcester Foregate Street via Droitwich Spa
  - Some services reverse or terminate at Worcester Shrub Hill.

Preceding station	National Rail	Following station
Jewellery Quarter	West Midlands Railway; Birmingham to Worcester via Kidderminster line Snow Hill lines	Birmingham Moor Street
Terminus	Chiltern Railways; London-Birmingham-Stourbridge	Birmingham Moor Street
Jewellery Quarter	Chiltern Railways; London-Birmingham-Stourbridge	Birmingham Moor Street
	Heritage railways	
Terminus	Vintage Trains; The Shakespeare Express; July–September	Birmingham Moor Street
	Historical railways	
Hockley	Great Western Railway; Various Routes (1854–1972)	Bordesley
St Paul's	West Midlands Metro (1999–2015)	Terminus

== Tram stops ==
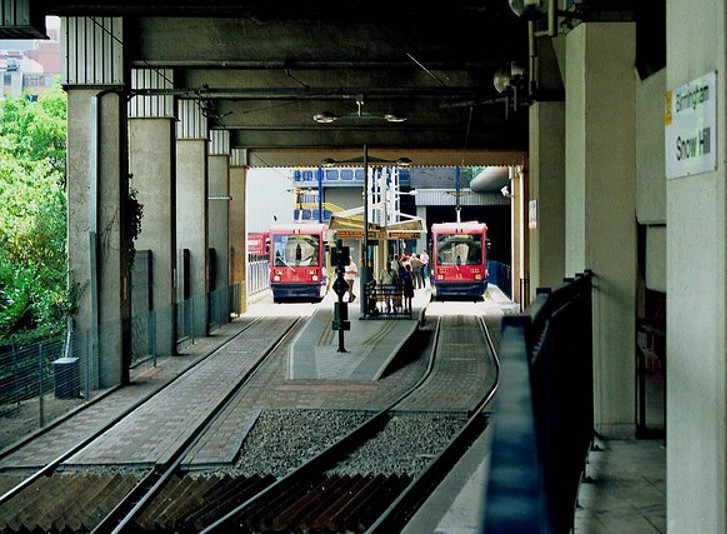
Former Snow Hill terminus stop (1999–2015)

=== Former terminus ===
From 1999 until 2015, Snow Hill was the terminus of the Midland Metro Line 1 from Wolverhampton. Opening on 31 May 1999, it occupied the space previously used by platform 4 of the main line station. The stop had two platforms, and was approached by a short section of single track.

The Snow Hill terminus was officially closed on 24 October 2015, and the approach line disconnected, in order to allow the new extension into Birmingham City Centre to be connected to the existing line. It is therefore the only Midland Metro stop so far to have been permanently closed. Trams terminated at St Paul's until the first part of the extension was brought into service as far as Bull Street on 6 December 2015.

=== Current through stop ===
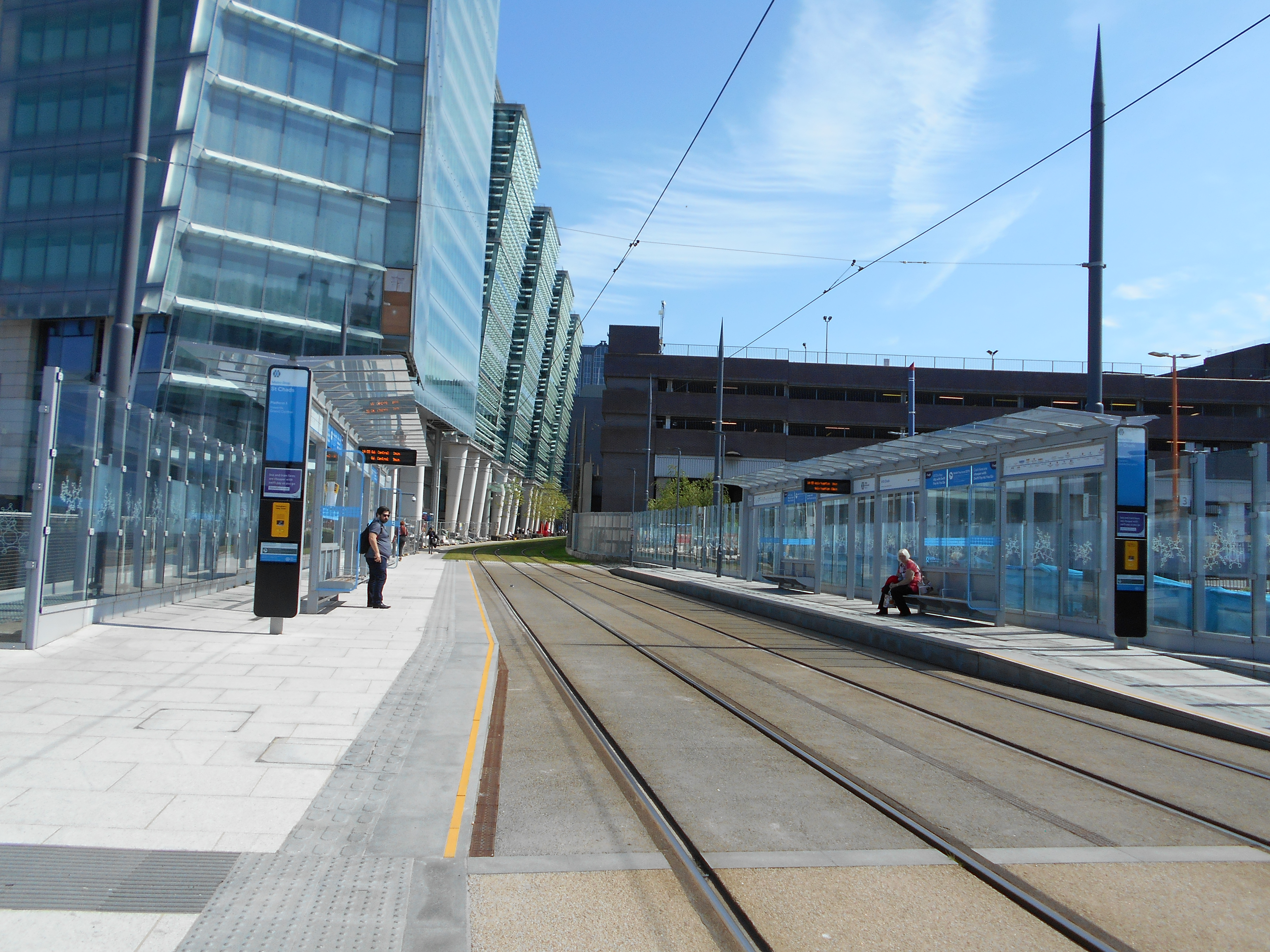
St Chads stop, alongside Snow Hill the replacement for the former terminus.

As part of the extension, a new through stop serving Snow Hill opened outside the station and further west, on the tram viaduct near the Livery Street entrance. Funding for this was confirmed in the October 2010 Comprehensive Spending Review. A new viaduct was built alongside the station as part of the Snowhill development to carry the tram lines into the city centre. This allows platform 4 to be returned to main line use in the future.

The new Snow Hill through stop was opened on 2 June 2016, two days after the full opening of the city-centre extension to New Street. However, the necessary works to allow passenger access to the stop from the street or adjacent railway station had not at the time been completed, meaning passengers could only access the stop by a walkway alongside the tracks from the city centre. Stairs and a lift connecting the stop to the street below were completed in September 2017.

In January 2017, the stop was renamed St Chads as the name Snow Hill was considered misleading for passengers using the mainline station due to the new stop's lack of direct interchange with the railway station, and the latter's closer proximity to the Bull Street stop. The stop is now advertised as an alternate interchange to the mainline station, with Bull Street being the main interchange.

In December 2018 it was announced that a new entrance would be constructed at Snow Hill station, by opening up an arch in the railway viaduct. This allows direct interchange between St Chads tram stop and the railway station.

== Accidents and incidents ==
In October 1854, a derailed engine fell into Great Charles Street, below the station.

== See also ==
- Birmingham International railway station
- List of Midland Metro stations
- Transport in Birmingham

== Bibliography ==
- Boynton, John (2001). Main Line to Metro: Train and tram on the Great Western route: Birmingham Snow Hill – Wolverhampton. Kidderminster: Mid England Books. ISBN 978-0-9522248-9-1.
- Harrison, Derek (1978). Salute to Snow Hill: The Rise and Fall of Birmingham's Snow Hill Railway Station 1852–1977. Birmingham: Barbryn Press. ISBN 978-0-906160-00-8.
- Birmingham Snow Hill - A Great Station : Ian Baxter and Richard Harper (Published by the authors in conjunction with Kidderminster Railway Museum) : 2002 ISBN 0 9534775 1 7
