= Walsall–Wolverhampton line =

Railway line in the UK

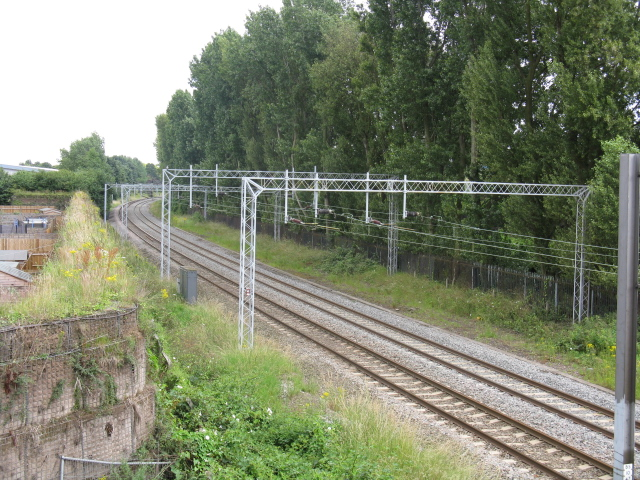
- View of the line at Bentley Road South

Overview
- Owner: Network Rail
- Locale: Wolverhampton; Walsall; West Midlands (region)
- Termini: Walsall; Wolverhampton
- Stations: 4

Service
- Operator: West Midlands Railway
- Depot: Bescot

Technical
- Track gauge: 1,435 mm (4 ft 8 1/2 in) standard gauge
- Electrification: Overhead line, 25 kV 50 Hz AC
Route map
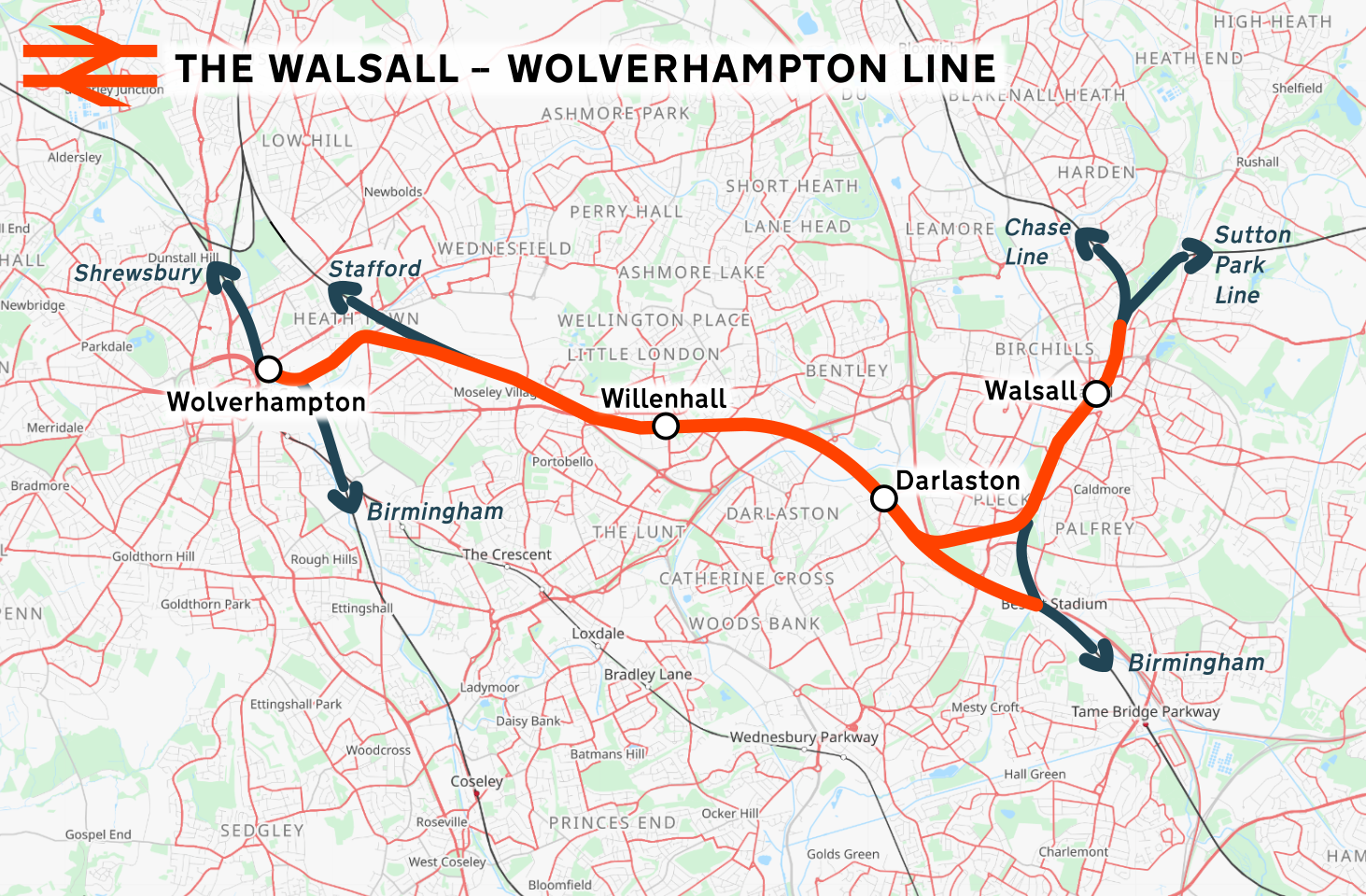
(Click to expand)

The Walsall–Wolverhampton line is a railway line in the West Midlands, England, connecting the town of Walsall to the city of Wolverhampton. It was opened in 1837 by the Grand Junction Railway. Passenger services operated until 1965, when they with withdrawn alongside the closure of the intermediate stations on the line. Direct passenger services between Walsall and Wolverhampton resumed in 1998, but were withdrawn in 2008 due to low passenger numbers.

In 2017, the West Midlands Combined Authority announced that they would restore passenger services to the line over the following decade, with new stations at Willenhall and Darlaston. In March 2026, stopping passenger services on the line resumed, operating between Birmingham New Street and Shrewsbury. No passenger service currently operates from Walsall along the line.

Alongside the stopping passenger service, the line is used heavily by freight trains. It is also used as a diversionary route when engineering works are carried out on the West Coast Main Line.

== History ==
=== Early history ===
Most of the present route was opened in 1837 by the Grand Junction Railway (GJR). Built as a long-distance trunk route connecting the Liverpool and Manchester Railway with Birmingham, the original GJR line did not directly serve either Walsall or Wolverhampton, instead running around the outskirts of both settlements.

A station on the original line called Wolverhampton was opened in 1837, a mile east of the town centre. This station was renamed Wednesfield Heath in 1855 after the centrally located Wolverhampton (High level) station on the Stour Valley Line was opened. Wednesfield Heath was then closed in 1873.

A station called Walsall (also known as Bescot Bridge) was also opened in 1837, located some distance from the town. This station was closed in 1850, shortly after the present Walsall station opened on the South Staffordshire Line. It was reopened as Wood Green in 1881 and closed again in 1941.

The GJR amalgamated with other railways to form the London and North Western Railway (LNWR) in 1846. The present line was completed in 1881, when the LNWR constructed two spurs from the GJR at Wolverhampton and Walsall. The Wolverhampton spur diverged south from the original line and linked to Wolverhampton (High Level) station. The spur at the Walsall end diverged north from the GJR and linked to the South Staffordshire Line at Pleck Junction, where it gave access to Walsall station. Pleck station was opened on the Walsall spur and closed in 1958.

After grouping in 1923, the line came under the control of the London, Midland and Scottish Railway. After nationalisation, control passed to British Rail in 1948.

The line's strategic use as a freight and diversionary route led to it being electrified with overhead wires in the 1960s, along with the connecting Walsall Line, as an offshoot of the West Coast Main Line electrification. However, the local passenger service was withdrawn in 1965 as part of the Beeching Axe, and the line's remaining intermediate stations at Darlaston James Bridge and Willenhall Bilston Street were closed.

=== Post-privatisation history ===
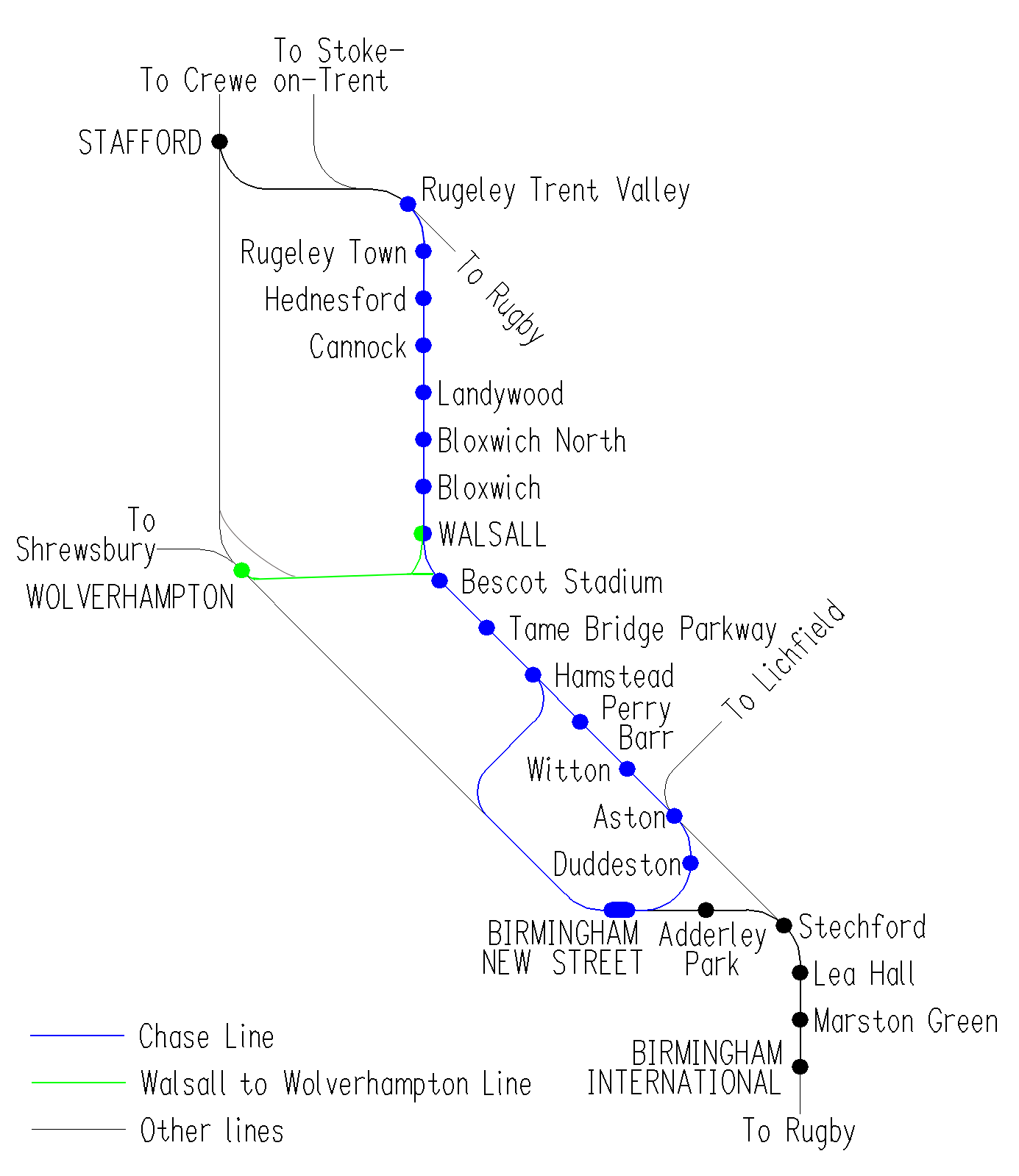
Diagram of the line (in green) in relation to the other railways in the area

Direct passenger service between Walsall and Wolverhampton resumed on 24 May 1998. The hourly service was funded by Centro and operated by Central Trains (later London Midland). However, in 2005 the Strategic Rail Authority proposed the withdrawal of the service, citing low passenger numbers and a lack of rolling stock. Centro opposed this, arguing that the bus service between Walsall and Wolverhampton was a poor replacement, as it took 40 minutes compared to 15 minutes by train, and the service was given a temporary reprieve. There were also proposals to reopen the stations at Willenhall Bilston Street and Portobello to increase passenger numbers and the viability of the service. During the early-mid 2000s, the line was used as part of an hourly service between Walsall and Wellington. But these services were withdrawn in 2006 and the service was reduced to an hourly service between Walsall and Wolverhampton, with only one or two trains per day in each direction extending to Wellington in the early morning and late at night.

It was announced in July 2008 that the government was withdrawing funding for this service, and as a result the local service was mainly withdrawn as of December 2008. However, the line remained open for freight trains, and the section between Wolverhampton and Darlaston Junction continued to be used by certain trains between Birmingham and Wolverhampton and as a diversionary route when the West Coast Main Line was closed for engineering works. Between 2008 and 2011 this section was also used by the now defunct Wrexham & Shropshire passenger services to London.

The full service was withdrawn on 13 December 2008, although there was still a 'Parliamentary train' – initially, one train per day ran directly from Walsall to Wolverhampton on weekdays, leaving Walsall at 19:36, but this was replaced in the 19 May 2013 timetable by a Saturdays-only train from Wolverhampton to Walsall leaving Wolverhampton at 05:42 (in the December 2019 timetable). Although Centro retained ambitions to reinstate the service and reopen stations at Willenhall Bilston Street and Portobello, its plans were put on hold in 2012 pending the next West Midlands franchise award in 2016.

A service calling at all stations via Birmingham New street then took over, taking over 1 hour, compared with 15 minutes for the direct service, and London Midland advised passengers to use the National Express West Midlands 529 bus instead.

=== Recent history ===
The West Midlands Combined Authority announced their intention to restore a passenger service to the line, along with new stations at Willenhall and Darlaston in 2017. As part of these proposals, the two local stations were to drop their original suffixes of Bilston Street and James Bridge respectively.

In August 2018, land was secured for the proposed station at Darlaston. The proposed timetable for the line at the time included an hourly Wolverhampton to Walsall service as well as an hourly Wolverhampton to Birmingham service calling at Willenhall, Darlaston and Tame Bridge Parkway. The line was also identified by the Campaign for Better Transport as a priority 1 candidate for reopening.

Planning applications for the two intermediate stations were formally submitted in March 2020. Construction began in autumn 2021, with a month-long pause in September 2023 due to a contractor takeover.

From the timetable change in May 2022, London Northwestern Railway services between Crewe and Birmingham New Street via Stoke-on-Trent began running on the line again, in preparation for the opening of the two new stations.

Willenhall and Darlaston stations reopened to the public on Thursday 19 March 2026, with an hourly service in each direction between Birmingham New Street and Shrewsbury via Tame Bridge Parkway and Wolverhampton six days a week.

== Future plans ==
As part of the Destination Manchester programme, London Northwestern Railway aims to introduce a stopping service between Manchester Airport and Birmingham New Street along the line, with a proposed start time of December 2026.

A stopping service from Wolverhampton to Walsall is also proposed.

Proposed open-access operator Wrexham, Shropshire & Midlands Railway have also applied to the Office of Rail & Road for a service from Wrexham to London Euston that would use the line, including station calls at Wolverhampton and Darlaston.
