= Portobello railway station (Wolverhampton) =

Former railway station in England

Portobello

General information
- Location: Portobello, Willenhall, Wolverhampton; England
- Coordinates: 52.5852°N 2.0747°W
- Grid reference: SO950985
- Platforms: 2

Other information
- Status: Disused

History
- Original company: Grand Junction Railway
- Pre-grouping: London and North Western Railway

Key dates
- 1837: Opened
- 1873: Closed to passenger traffic
Location

Portobello railway station was a station built on the Grand Junction Railway in 1837. It served the Portobello area of Willenhall, and was located near to the level crossing on Noose Lane

The station closed in 1873 due to being unprofitable. The lines through the station are in use today as part of the Walsall to Wolverhampton Line.

There have been recent proposals to examine reopening of the station.

Preceding station	Disused railways	Following station
Wolverhampton High Level	London and North Western Railway; Walsall to Wolverhampton Line	Willenhall Bilston Street
Wednesfield Heath	Grand Junction Railway	Willenhall Bilston Street
