= Pleck railway station =

Railway station in Walsall, England

Pleck
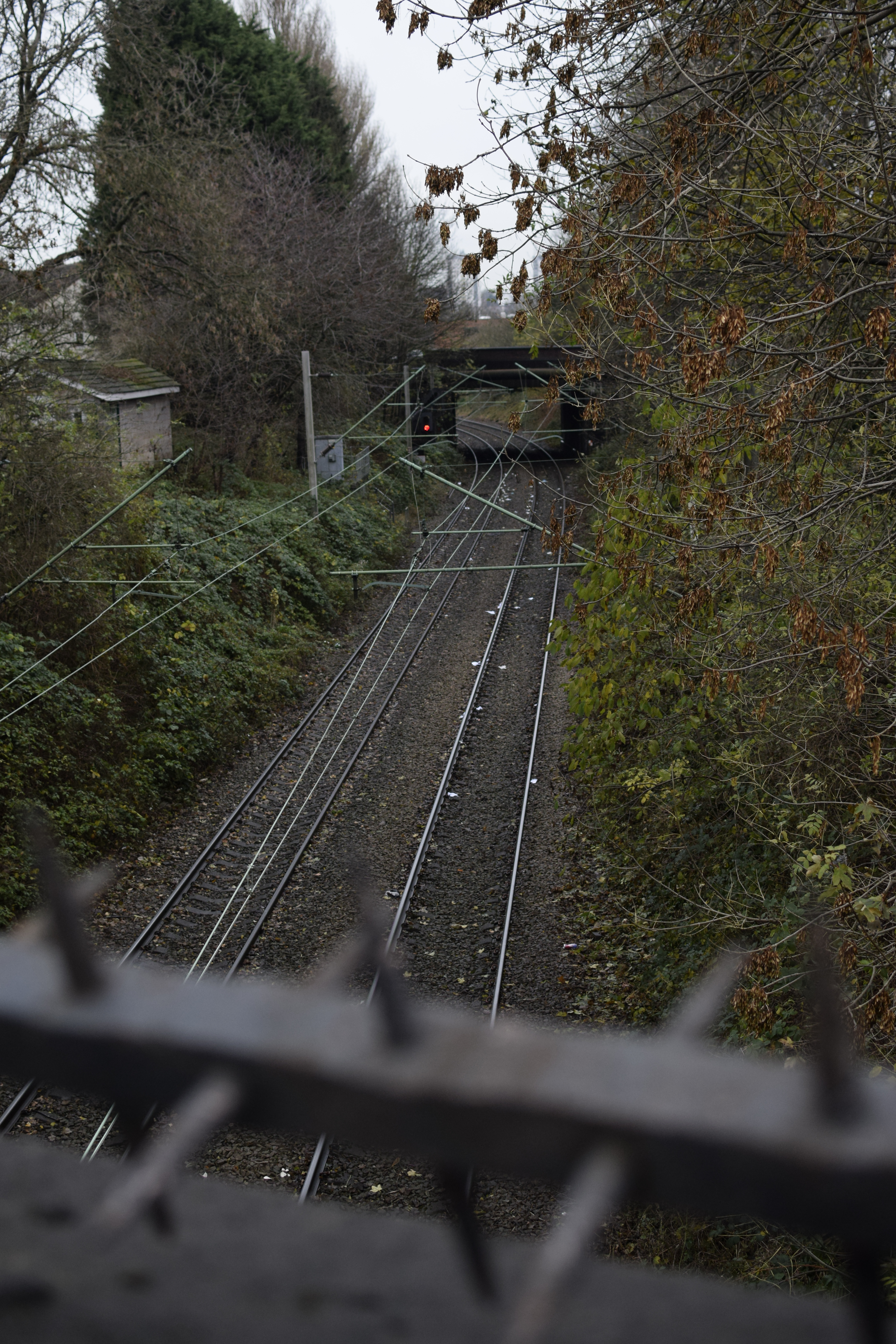
- Pleck railway station

General information
- Location: Pleck, Metropolitan Borough of Walsall; England
- Coordinates: 52.5715°N 2.0023°W
- Grid reference: SO999970
- Platforms: 2

Other information
- Status: Disused

History
- Pre-grouping: London and North Western Railway
- Post-grouping: London, Midland and Scottish Railway

Key dates
- 1 October 1881: Opened
- 1 January 1917: Closed
- 1 May 1924: Re-opened
- 17 November 1958: Closed
Location

Pleck railway station was a station built on the London and North Western Railway in 1881, on the connecting line between the Grand Junction Railway and the South Staffordshire Line. It served the Pleck area of Walsall, and was located just off Bescot Road, between the Slaney Road and Slaters Lane junctions.

The station closed in 1917, only to reopen in 1924. It was closed permanently in 1958. The lines through the station are in use today as part of the Walsall-Wolverhampton Line for freight only.

Preceding station	Disused railways	Following station
Darlaston James Bridge	Walsall to Wolverhampton Line earlier Grand Junction Railway	Walsall
