= Bushbury railway station =

Disused railway station in Wolverhampton in the West Midlands, England

Bushbury

General information
- Location: Bushbury, Wolverhampton; England
- Coordinates: 52.6081°N 2.1240°W
- Grid reference: SJ916011
- Platforms: 4

Other information
- Status: Disused

History
- Pre-grouping: London and North Western Railway

Key dates
- 1852: Opened
- 1912: Closed to passenger traffic
Location

Bushbury railway station was a railway station opened by the London and North Western Railway on 2 August 1852. It served the Bushbury area of Wolverhampton, and near to the junction of Showell Road and Bushbury Lane.

The station was located within the Bushbury Junction complex, and was between the Grand Junction line to Wednesfield Heath and the later Stour Valley Line to Wolverhampton High Level; and just to the north of the connecting line to Wolverhampton Low Level.

The station closed in 1912.

Preceding station	Disused railways	Following station
Wednesfield Heath	London and North Western Railway former Grand Junction Railway	Four Ashes
Wolverhampton High Level	London and North Western Railway former Stour Valley Line	Four Ashes
