= Wrexham, Shropshire & Midlands Railway =

Proposed UK open-access train operator

Overview
- Franchise: Open-access operator
- Main regions: North East Wales; West Midlands; South East England; Greater London
- Stations called at: December 2025 proposed route: Wrexham General; Gobowen; Shrewsbury; Wellington (since Dec 2025); Telford Central; Wolverhampton; Darlaston; Walsall; Coleshill Parkway; Nuneaton; Milton Keynes Central; London Euston
- Parent company: Alstom
- Dates of operation: TBA–

Other
- Website: www.wsmr.co.uk

The Wrexham, Shropshire & Midlands Railway (WSMR) is a proposed open-access train operator in the United Kingdom.

In March 2024, it submitted an application to operate passenger train services between Wrexham General and London Euston via Shrewsbury, Wolverhampton, Nuneaton and Milton Keynes Central, with services first proposed to start in 2025. However, on 3 July 2025, the Office of Rail and Road (ORR) rejected its initial application, with Network Rail also expressing its opposition to the initial proposed route over concerns of a lack of capacity on parts of the West Coast Main Line.

In December 2025, it submitted another application, that requests fewer train paths for services and adds Wellington as a stop. The company then set the end of 2026 as a possible service start date. The ORR rejected the revised application in October 2026.

The proposed operator was Alstom, its first in the United Kingdom, with SLC Rail as consultants. It would also re-introduce a Shropshire–London direct service, last operated in 2024, as Shropshire is the only English county without a direct train service to London.

== History and description ==
The proposed service was officially announced on 14 March 2024, following the operator submitting its formal application to operate, to the Office of Rail and Road (ORR). If approved, it had initially hoped to operate services from May 2025 and creating a possible 50 new jobs, mainly in North Wales and the English Midlands. WSMR estimates its proposed service would have 1.5 million people in their catchment area outside London. The plans received support from Huw Merriman, Minister of State for Transport.

Had the route been approved, it would have reinstated a Shropshire–London direct service, following Avanti West Coast's Shrewsbury–London Euston service being terminated on 2 June 2024. Shropshire is the only county in England that no longer has a direct train service to London.

The open-access operator would be operated by Alstom, and it would be its first passenger rail operating service in the United Kingdom if approved. The Birmingham-based consultancy firm SLC Rail would advise Alstom in the development of the project.

The proposed operator was compared to a previous train operating company, Wrexham & Shropshire, which also operated Wrexham to London services via Shropshire between 2008 and 2011. Although Wrexham & Shropshire operated along the Chiltern Main Line to London Marylebone. while WSMR proposes to use the West Coast Main Line to Euston. WSMR has no links to Wrexham & Shropshire.

=== Initial bid ===
The initial plan was for a daily, Monday to Saturday service between Wrexham General and London Euston of five trains in each direction, reduced to four on Sundays. Trains were planned to call at Gobowen, Shrewsbury, Telford Central, Wolverhampton, Darlaston (when re-opened), Walsall, Coleshill Parkway, Nuneaton and Milton Keynes. It would use the current freight-only (since 1965) Sutton Park line to bypass Birmingham, particularly the Wolverhampton–Birmingham New Street–Rugby corridor. The service would allow direct trains between Wolverhampton and Walsall to Nuneaton for the first time.

The estimated travel time between Wrexham and London was stated three hours, while between Shrewsbury and London was two hours.

Telford and Wrekin Council had requested that trains also call at Wellington. A new station at Aldridge may be opened; the line passes through the site of the former Aldridge railway station. Members of Parliament in Shropshire and Wrexham, stated their support for the proposal following its announcement.

In March 2024, Alstom stated that details on the operator's fleet, branding and service timetable would be announced at a later date. Although it was later reported that the operator's train fleet would have "infrastructure monitoring equipment", and are planned to have first and standard class seating. The company's mobilisation director, Darren Horley, stated WSMR is planning to have features such as "instant delay repay" if any of their trains are delayed, a "seat selection facility", and possibly an "advance ordering" system for food and drinks before passengers travel on their trains. The company also stated they aspired to invest in infrastructure, such as funding enhancements at stations, and possibly a new parkway station near Shrewsbury to ease congestion.

In June 2025, Network Rail said it could not support the Alstom/SLC Rail application for open-access due to congestion on infrastructure, lack of timetable capacity, current passenger traffic and how the service would increase such traffic. On 3 July 2025, the ORR rejected WSMR's application reiterating concerns of insufficient capacity and the subsequent impact on existing services, particularly along the southern end of the West Coast Main Line (WCML) between Rugby and Euston. Two other open-access operator proposals by Lumo and Virgin Trains, using the same southern section of the WCML, were also rejected on the same day. Following the rejection, WSMR stated they intend to "reengage" with the ORR and determine what "next steps" the company should take. Julia Buckley, Labour MP for Shrewsbury, voiced her continued efforts for the service and stated she would work with Alstom to create an revised bid "as soon as possible", as did Andrew Ranger, Labour MP for Wrexham in working with WSMR in developing a revised bid. Shaun Davies, Labour MP for Telford and the Telford and Wrekin Council also expressed their disappointment in the decision.

=== Second bid ===
On 1 December 2025, they submitted another bid, requesting fewer train paths, with three (and later a fourth in the future or as a contingent) daily services rather than five, and the addition of Wellington as a stop. With an estimated four-hour journey time between Wrexham and London. In the application, they mentioned that they will use the Class 221 or Class 222, although the 222s are instead being split between Lumo and ScotRail. While six 221 Derby-based units from Avanti West Coast were also being requested by CrossCountry. The company hoped to begin services towards the end of 2026. The ORR was expected to make a decision on the seven-year track access agreement in spring 2026.

On 2 March 2026, WSMR ran a charter train, along the route to London Euston, making calls at the proposed stations it would serve. The service was proposed by Julia Buckley, MP for Shrewsbury, and other MPs in the Midlands, with the service carrying more than 120 passengers, including MPs, councillors, business leaders, and other dignitaries. With Buckley, leading the delegation, to deliver a collection of letters and petitions to 10 Downing Street. The train service used GB Railfreight 57303 and 57306, and WSMR-branded carriages from Eastern Rail Services. By March 2026, 5,500 people had signed a petition backing the proposal.

On 26 March 2026, the operator said, that if their application is successful, they would invest £6.5 million to upgrade an existing diesel multiple unit fleet in the short-term, and in the long-term, invest in Alstom's new battery-electric bi-mode trains. The new trains, the Alstom Adessia class, are a UK-specific type train based on the previous Alstom Aventra class, and are hoping for them to be introduced for the company's "long-distance, high-speed derivative" services from 2030.

The ORR rejected the revised application, against citing the lack of capacity along the West Coast Main Line.
