= Wednesfield Heath railway station =

Former railway station in England

Wednesfield Heath

General information
- Location: Heath Town, Wolverhampton; England
- Coordinates: 52.5952°N 2.1083°W
- Grid reference: SO927997
- Platforms: 2

Other information
- Status: Disused

History
- Original company: Grand Junction Railway
- Pre-grouping: London and North Western Railway
- Post-grouping: London, Midland and Scottish Railway

Key dates
- 1837: Opened as Wolverhampton
- 1853: Closed
- 1855: Reopened as Wednesfield Heath
- 1873: Closed to passenger traffic
- 1965: Closed to goods traffic
Location

Wednesfield Heath railway station was a station built on the Grand Junction Railway and opened on 4 July 1837 as Wolverhampton (often signposted as Wednesfield Heath for Wolverhampton). It was the first railway station serving the town (now city) of Wolverhampton, and was located around a mile to the east of the city centre within the suburb of Heath Town, on Station Road (also known as Powell Street). It was designated as a First Class station.

The station was closed in 1853, when it was replaced by a more centrally located station on the nearby Stour Valley Line. It reopened two years later, renamed Wednesfield Heath.

The station was closed to passengers by the London and North Western Railway on 1 January 1873. The station remained open for goods traffic until 1965 when it was demolished - leaving only part of the northbound platform extant. Part of the area is now a nature reserve, called Station Fields.

The lines through the station are in use today as a bypass for Wolverhampton.

Preceding station	Disused railways	Following station
Bushbury	Grand Junction Railway	Portobello

== See also ==
- Walsall to Wolverhampton Line
