= Darlaston railway station =

Railway station in Darlaston, Walsall

Darlaston
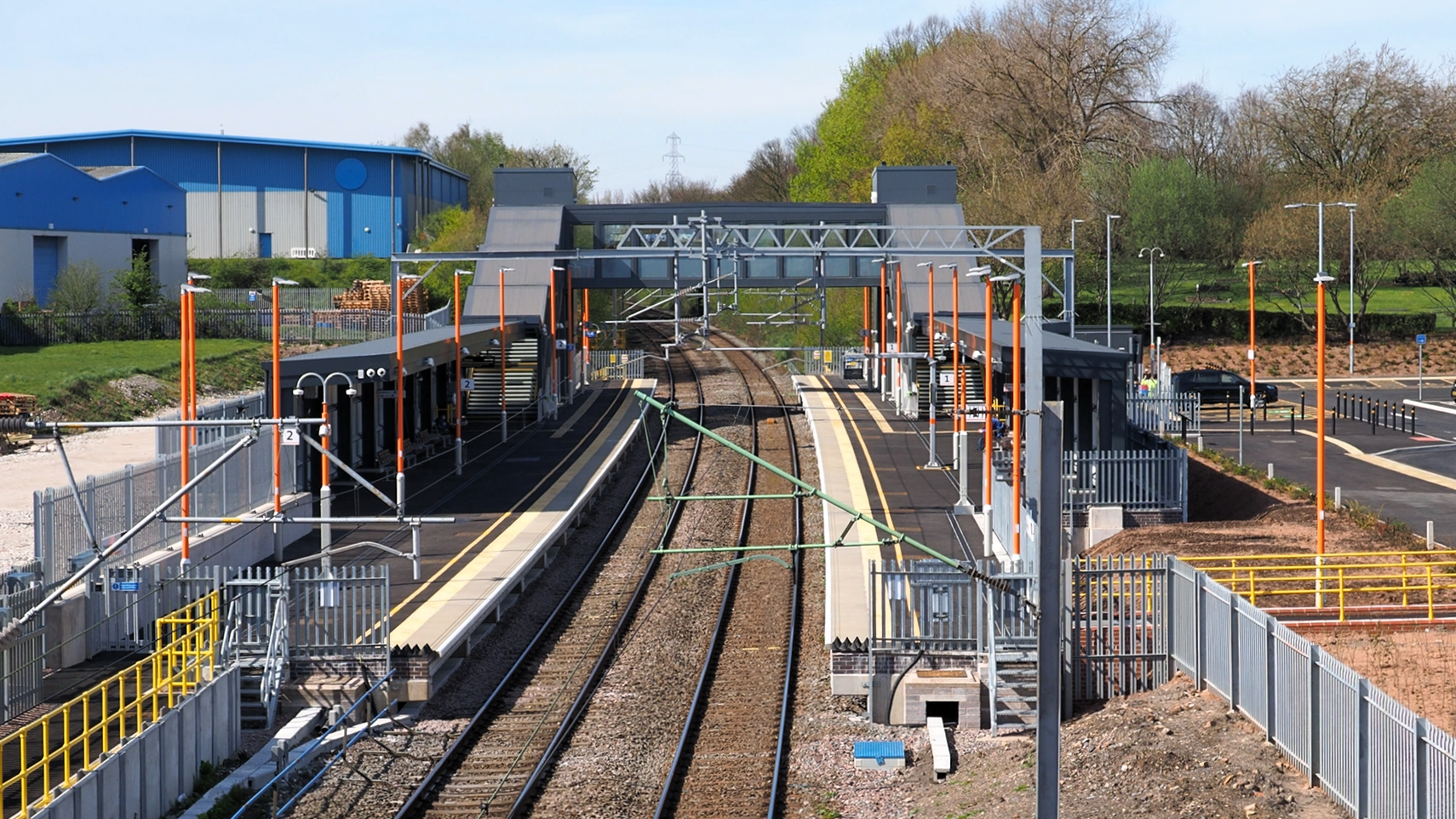

General information
- Location: Darlaston, Metropolitan Borough of Walsall; England
- Coordinates: 52.5751°N 2.0188°W
- Grid reference: SO988974
- Line: Walsall-Wolverhampton line
- Platforms: 2

Other information
- Status: Open
- Station code: DAS

History
- Original company: Grand Junction Railway
- Pre-grouping: London and North Western Railway
- Post-grouping: London, Midland and Scottish Railway

Key dates
- 1837; 189 years ago: Opened
- 1965; 61 years ago: Closed
- 19 March 2026; 8 months ago: Reopened as Darlaston

Passengers
- 2025/26: 1,902
Location
Notes
- Passenger statistics from the Office of Rail and Road

Darlaston is a railway station on the Walsall–Wolverhampton line, serving trains running between Shrewsbury and Birmingham New Street. The station serves the town of Darlaston, in the Metropolitan Borough of Walsall. It opened on 19 March 2026 and replaces a station that previously served the town from 1837 to 1965.

== History ==
The original station was opened as Darlaston by the Grand Junction Railway in 1837. It was located southeast of the current station, between Kendricks Road and Walsall Road. Between 1837 and September 1863 the station was, at various times, suffixed James' Bridge, James's Bridge and Green.

On 14 September 1863 a station named Darlaston was opened on the Darlaston Loop of the South Staffordshire line. The 1837 station then became known as James Bridge. On 1 November 1887 the 1863 station closed and the 1837 station changed its name to James Bridge for Darlaston.

In March 1889 the name changed to Darlaston and James Bridge.

The station was closed in 1965.

=== Reopening ===
Andy Street pledged in his mayoral campaign in 2017 to reopen the station, however no opening timeline was given.

In September 2017, the West Midlands Combined Authority proposed reopening the station by 2024 as part of the region's £4 billion transport plan, along with Willenhall. Plans for the new station were published in August 2018, with the station proposed to be located on Kendricks Road, northwest of the former station site.

Despite press reports that the planning application for the station was formally submitted in March 2020, this did not happen until July. Planning permission was granted in October 2020 and the station was planned to open in 2023. In March 2021, it was stated that full construction would start in the autumn. Construction paused in September 2023, before resuming in October with new contractors. The station opened on 19 March 2026.

== Services ==
Weekday and Saturday services operate hourly between Shrewsbury and Birmingham New Street. There is no service on Sundays. All services are operated by West Midlands Railway.

- 1tph to Shrewsbury via Wolverhampton.
- 1tph to Birmingham New Street via Tame Bridge Parkway.

Preceding station	National Rail	Following station
Willenhall	West Midlands Railway Walsall–Wolverhampton line	Tame Bridge Parkway
	Future services	
Willenhall	West Midlands Railway Walsall–Wolverhampton line	Walsall
	Proposed services	
Wolverhampton	Wrexham, Shropshire & Midlands Railway	Walsall
	Disused railways	
Willenhall Bilston Street	London and North Western Railway; Walsall to Wolverhampton Line	Pleck
Willenhall Bilston Street	Grand Junction Railway to Walsall Line	Wood Green
