= Wood Green (Old Bescot) railway station =

Railway station in Walsall, England

Wood Green (Old Bescot)
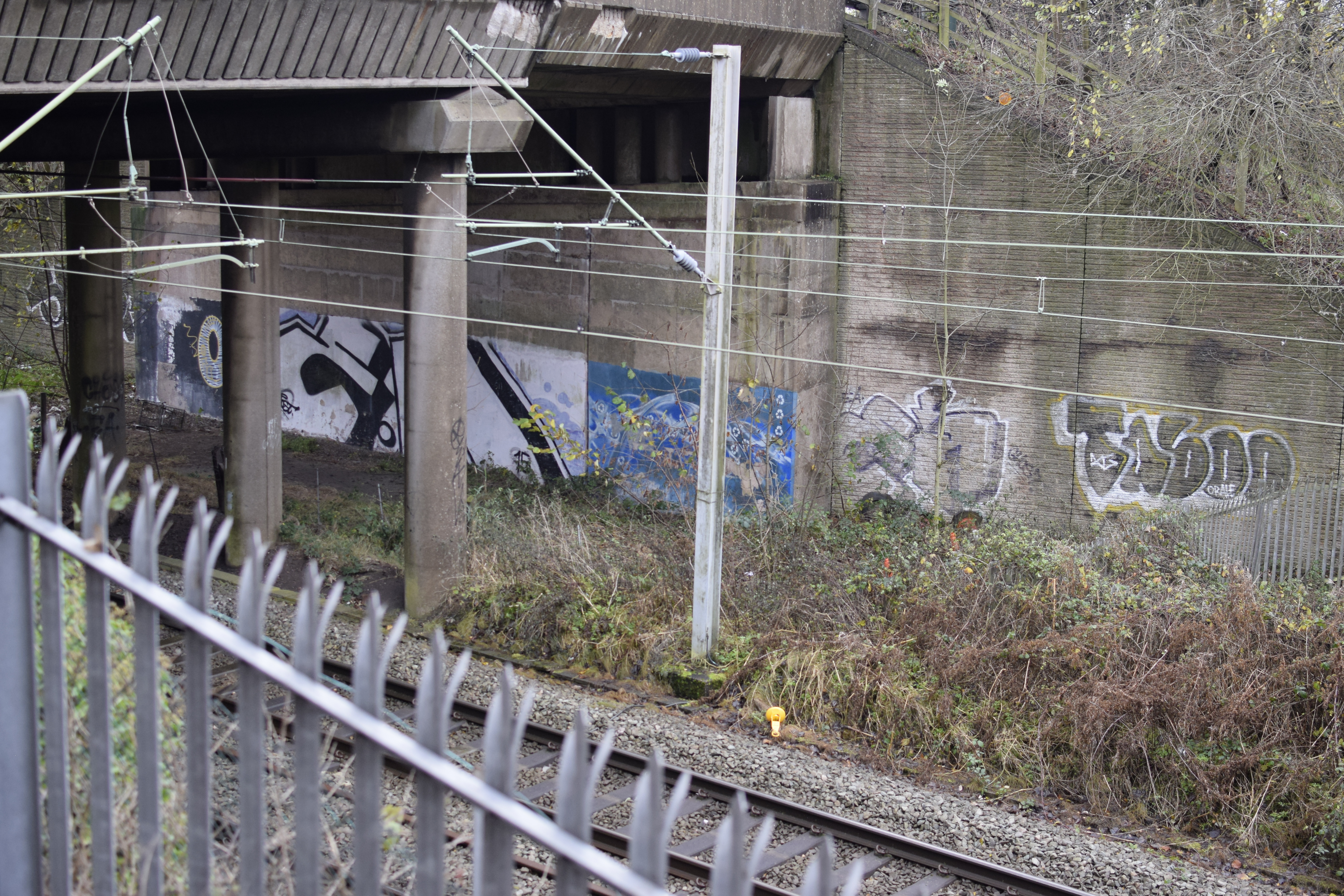
- Wood Green railway station

General information
- Location: Bescot, Walsall; England
- Coordinates: 52.5668°N 2.0041°W
- Grid reference: SO998965
- Platforms: 2

Other information
- Status: Disused

History
- Original company: Grand Junction Railway
- Pre-grouping: London and North Western Railway
- Post-grouping: London, Midland and Scottish Railway

Key dates
- 4 July 1837: Opened as Bescot Bridge
- 1 August 1850: Closed
- 1 February 1881: Re-opened as Wood Green (Old Bescot)
- 5 May 1941: Closed
Location

Wood Green (Old Bescot) railway station was a railway station that opened on the Grand Junction Railway in 1837. It served the Wood Green area of Wednesbury and Walsall. It closed in 1941. It was located near to where junction 9 of the M6 motorway has been located since the late 1960s.

== First station ==
It opened as Bescot Bridge on 4 July 1837, and was the Grand Junction Railway's main station for Walsall and Wednesbury being located between the two towns. The station was also known as Walsall station and this is how it was initially called in Bradshaw's guides. There is some confusion as to the station name and on what dates it changed. Neele (1904) recalls that it was originally Bescot Bridge, became Walsall and reverted to the original Bescot Bridge in 1847 when the South Staffordshire Railway opened the line between Bescot Junction and Walsall. (Note: There are several examples of Bescot being spelt Bescott, see for example Freeling (1841).)

The station was a second class station and therefore not all the trains stopped there, in 1837 there were two trains in each direction, by 1839 there were four trains in each direction that stopped.

Bescot Bridge station closed on 1 August 1850 when it was effectively replaced by Bescot Junction.

The station was located approximately 9¼ miles from Birmingham Curzon Street in a shallow cutting that was crossed by the Walsall to Wednesbury turnpike road, the station was slightly north of the boundary between the two towns. It would appear that Walsall provided the most passengers as a light van ran between the station and the town.

== Second station ==
Wood Green (Old Bescot) station was opened by the London and North Western Railway on the same site on 1 February 1881.

The station had two platforms, one either side of the double running line, both platforms were access from the road overbridge, there were no goods facilities, the station only dealt with passengers and parcels.

The station closed on 5 May 1941. The line remains open.

Preceding station	Historical railways	Following station
Darlaston James Bridge	Grand Junction Railway; 1837-1846	Newton Road
Darlaston James Bridge	London and North Western Railway; Grand Junction Railway; 1846-1850	Newton Road
Darlaston James Bridge	Station closed 1850-1881	Bescot Junction
Darlaston James Bridge	Station re-opened as Wood Green (Old Bescot); 1881-1941	Bescot Junction
	Existing situation	
Darlaston James Bridge; Station closed, Line open	Wood Green (Old Bescot); Station closed 1941, Line open	Bescot Stadium; Station open, Line open
