= Willenhall railway station =

Railway station in Willenhall, Walsall

Willenhall
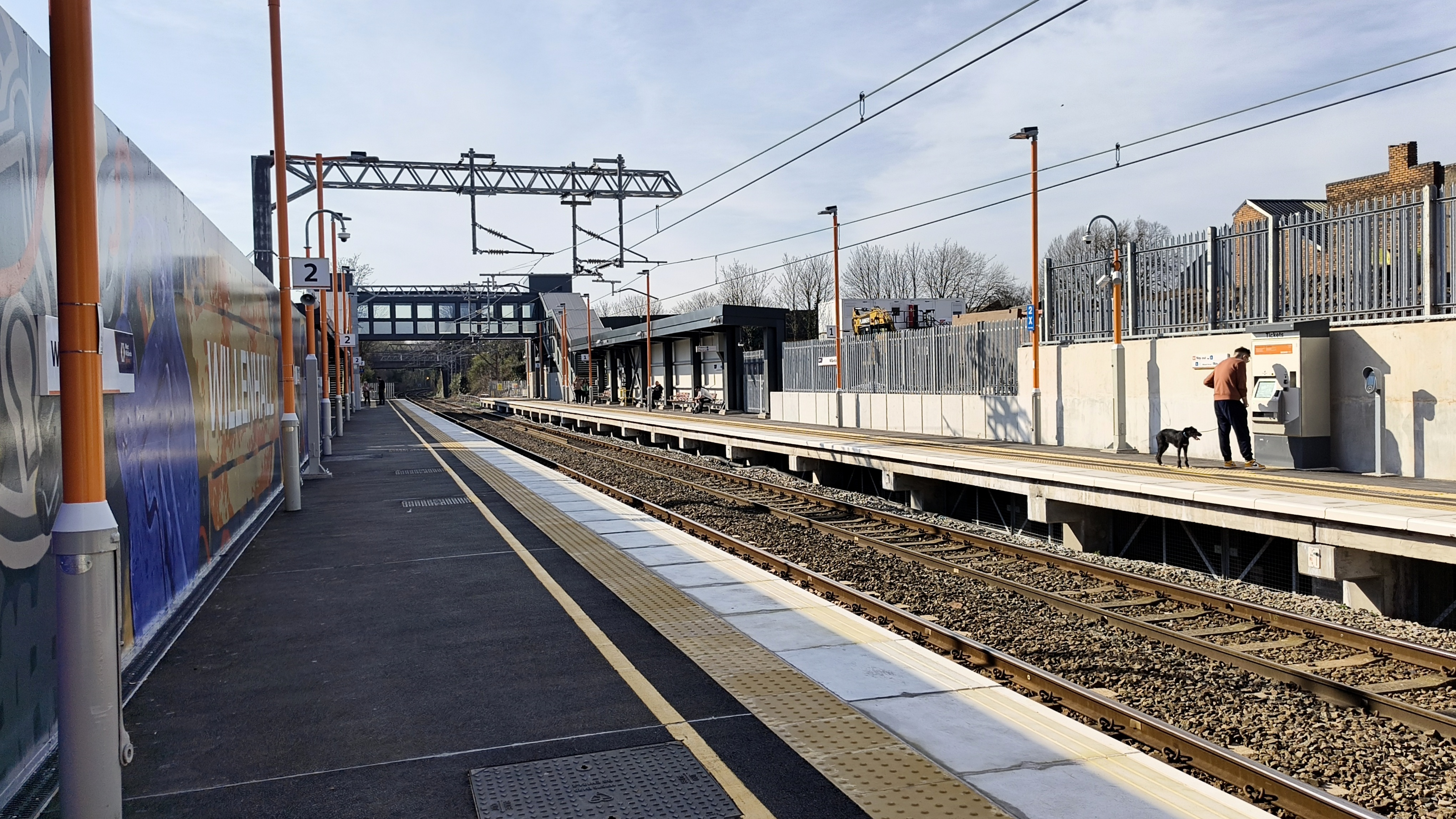
- New station

General information
- Location: Willenhall, Metropolitan Borough of Walsall; England
- Coordinates: 52.5822°N 2.0534°W
- Grid reference: SO964982
- Line: Walsall-Wolverhampton line
- Platforms: 2

Other information
- Status: Open
- Station code: WIA

History
- Original company: Grand Junction Railway
- Pre-grouping: London and North Western Railway
- Post-grouping: London, Midland and Scottish Railway

Key dates
- 1837: Opened as Willenhall Bilston Street
- 1965: Closed
- 19 March 2026: Reopened as Willenhall

Passengers
- 2025/26: 3,724
Location
Notes
- Passenger statistics from the Office of Rail and Road

Willenhall is a railway station on the Walsall–Wolverhampton line, serving trains running between Shrewsbury and Birmingham New Street. The station serves the town of Willenhall, in the Metropolitan Borough of Walsall. It opened on 19 March 2026 and replaces a station that previously served the town from 1837 to 1965.

== History ==
The original station was opened as Willenhall Bilston Street by the Grand Junction Railway in 1837. It was located east of the current station, on the opposite side of Bilston Street. It was one of two railway stations serving Willenhall, the other being Willenhall Stafford Street. The station was closed in 1965.

=== Reopening ===
From 1998, Central Trains operated a passenger service between Walsall and Wolverhampton on the line through the closed Willenhall station. Centro proposed reopening Willenhall to increase passenger numbers on the service, but the service ceased operation in 2008 due to the withdrawal of government funding.

In November 2016, the West Midlands Combined Authority submitted a bid to the second round of the New Stations Fund for funding to reopen the station. The bid, which would have provided up to 75% of construction costs for the project, was unsuccessful.

In September 2017, the West Midlands Combined Authority proposed reopening the station by 2024 as part of the region's £4 billion transport plan, along with Darlaston. Plans for the new station were published in March 2018, with the station proposed to be located on Bilston Street, west of the former station site. Funding for the project was confirmed by Transport Minister Chris Grayling.

The planning application for the station was formally submitted in March 2020 and was granted permission in October 2020. The station was planned to reopen to passengers in 2024. After delays during construction, the station reopened on 19 March 2026.

== Services ==
Weekday and Saturday services operate hourly between Shrewsbury and Birmingham New Street. There is no service on Sundays. All services are operated by West Midlands Railway.

- 1tph to Shrewsbury via Wolverhampton.
- 1tph to Birmingham New Street via Tame Bridge Parkway.

Preceding station	National Rail	Following station
Wolverhampton	West Midlands Railway; Walsall-Wolverhampton line	Darlaston
	Disused railways	
Portobello	Walsall to Wolverhampton Line earlier Grand Junction Railway	Darlaston James Bridge
