= Bescot Stadium railway station =

Railway station in the West Midlands, England

Bescot Stadium
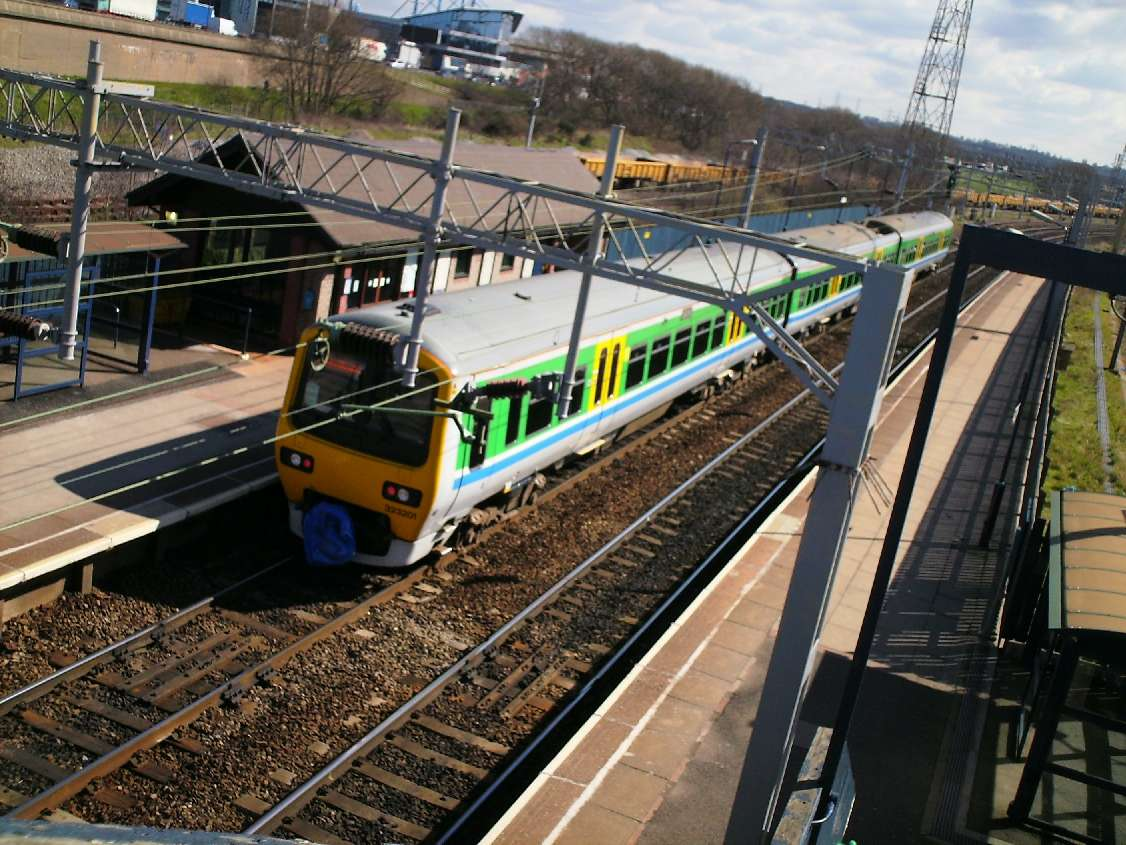

General information
- Location: Bescot, Walsall, United Kingdom
- Coordinates: 52.562°N 1.991°W
- Grid reference: SP007961
- Manager: West Midlands Railway
- Transit authority: Transport for West Midlands
- Platforms: 2

Other information
- Station code: BSC
- Fare zone: 4
- Classification: DfT category E

History
- Original company: London and North Western Railway
- Pre-grouping: London and North Western Railway
- Post-grouping: London, Midland and Scottish Railway

Key dates
- 1 May 1850: Opened as Bescot
- August 1850: Renamed Bescot Junction
- 16 August 1990: Renamed Bescot Stadium
- 2007: Rebuilt

Passengers
- 2021/22: ▲90,614
- 2022/23: ▲0.134 million
- 2023/24: ▲0.150 million
- 2024/25: ▲0.155 million
- 2025/26: ▲0.163 million
Location
Notes
- Passenger statistics from the Office of Rail and Road

Bescot Stadium railway station serves the Bescot area of Walsall in the West Midlands of England. The station is located in the borough of Sandwell, although it can only be reached from within the borough of Walsall. The station, and most trains serving it, are operated by West Midlands Railway.

== History ==
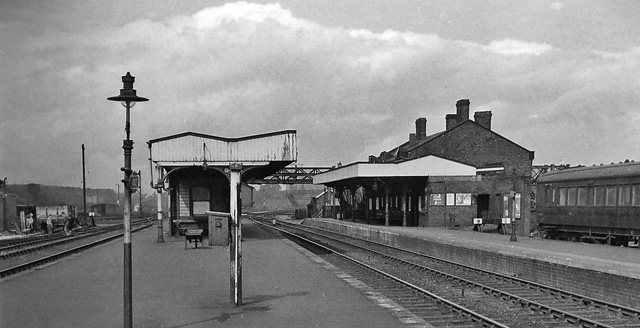
Bescot station in 1962

An earlier station was opened nearby as Bescot Bridge in 1837 by the Grand Junction Railway but was later renamed Wood Green (Old Bescot).

A station was subsequently opened as Bescot on the current site on 1 May 1850; it was renamed as Bescot Junction in August 1850.

The line through the station was electrified in 1966 as part of the London Midland Region's electrification programme. The actual energization of the line from Coventry to Walsall through Aston took place on 15 August 1966.

It was renamed Bescot Stadium in 1990 in order to serve Bescot Stadium, the newly built home of Walsall Football Club.

The station was re-opened on 11 September 2007 after a short period of closure for refurbishment. Whilst closed, no trains called at the station, but trains continued to pass through.

=== Incidents ===
On 8 December 1854 a South Staffordshire Railway passenger train from Walsall, hauled by a LNWR engine, struck the corner of a goods wagon, which was projecting from a siding towards the main line. The wagon then struck the engine's tender, and four of the following carriages, derailing and badly damaging them. One passenger died and over 20 more were in injured.

== Services ==
Bescot Stadium station is on the Chase Line between Birmingham New Street and Walsall. The typical Monday-Saturday daytime service sees three trains per hour in each direction. Southbound via Birmingham New Street there is one service per hour to London Euston and two stopping services per hour to Wolverhampton; with some services extended to/from Shrewsbury. Northbound, three trains per hour operate to Walsall with one continuing to Rugeley Trent Valley.

On Sundays and during the evenings, services are reduced.

Services are usually operated by Class 730 EMUs.

The station footbridge offers views of Bescot Yard, and its freight movements. Bescot TMD is adjacent to the station.

Access to the station is via Bescot Crescent (where there is a car park) and then a footpath which passes underneath the M6 motorway and over the River Tame, then an overbridge.

London Midland proposed the closure of the ticket office, but this request was overruled in September 2012 by the Transport Minister.

Preceding station	National Rail	Following station
Walsall	West Midlands Railway; Rugeley - Walsall - Birmingham; Chase Line	Tame Bridge Parkway
Walsall	West Midlands Railway; Walsall - Aston - Birmingham - Wolverhampton	Tame Bridge Parkway
Walsall	West Midlands Railway; Rugeley - Walsall - Birmingham - Wolverhampton; Limited service	Tame Bridge Parkway
