= Four Ashes, Staffordshire =

Village in Staffordshire, England

Coordinates: 52.6728°N 2.1264°W

Four Ashes
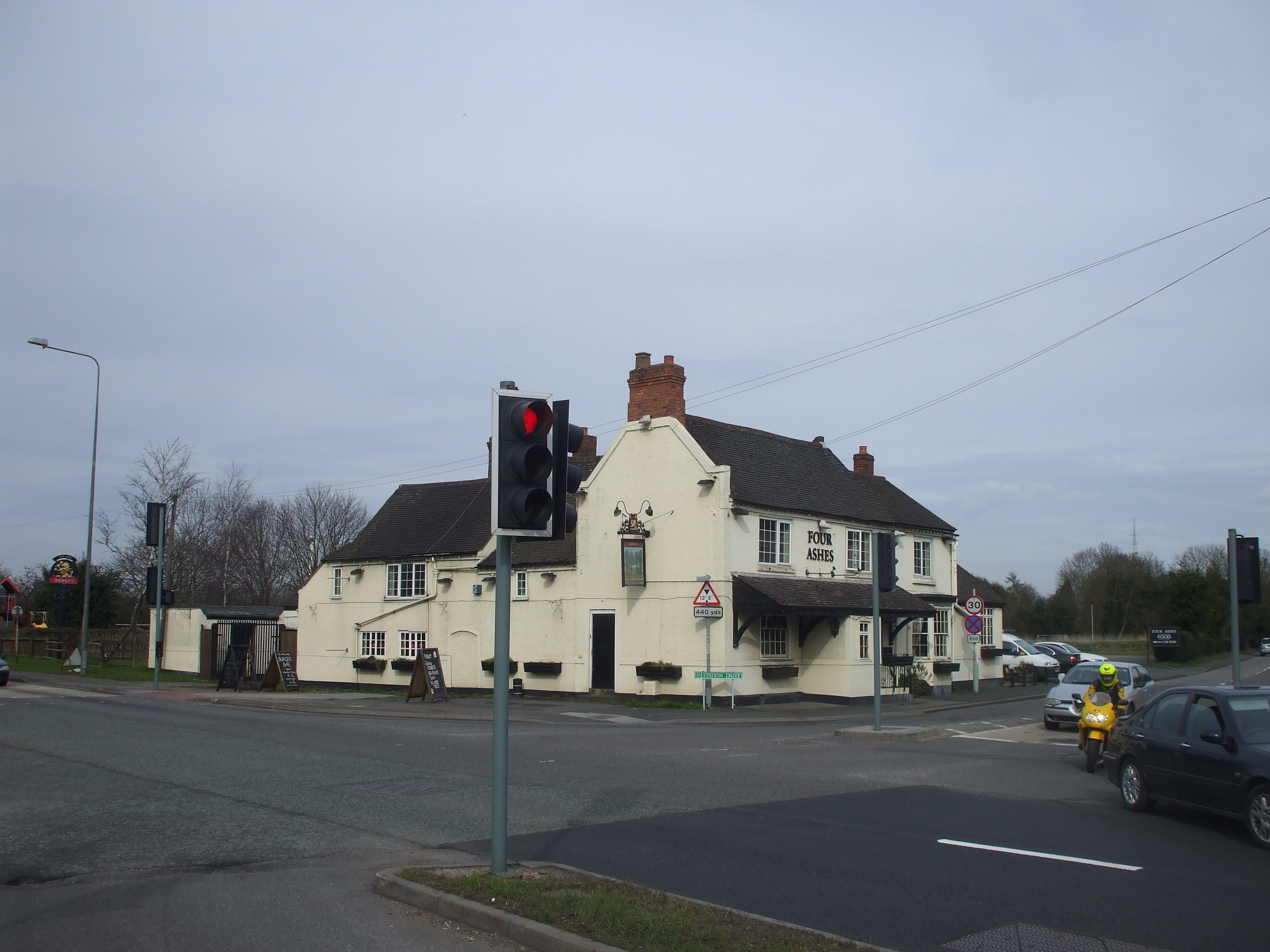
- The Four Ashes, at Four Ashes, now closed

- Location within Staffordshire
- OS grid reference: SJ9108
- Civil parish: Brewood and Coven
- District: South Staffordshire
- Shire county: Staffordshire
- Region: West Midlands
- Country: England
- Sovereign state: United Kingdom
- Post town: Stafford
- Postcode district: ST19
- Dialling code: 01902
- Police: Staffordshire
- Fire: Staffordshire
- Ambulance: West Midlands
- UK Parliament: Cannock Chase

Four Ashes is a village in the civil parish of Brewood and Coven, in the district of South Staffordshire in Staffordshire, England, located about 4 miles (6.4 km) west of Cannock, 7 miles (11 km) north of Wolverhampton and 12 miles (19 km) northwest of Walsall.

The village was served by a station on the Rugby-Birmingham-Stafford Line of the Grand Junction Railway. The station closed in 1959 although the railway line still runs past the village.

There is another hamlet in South Staffordshire called Four Ashes between Enville and Six Ashes. Four Ashes Hall is a 17th-century house and estate in that village, formerly open for conferences and weddings, which has been in the same family for 350 years.
