= Four Ashes railway station =

Former railway station in Staffordshire, England

Four Ashes
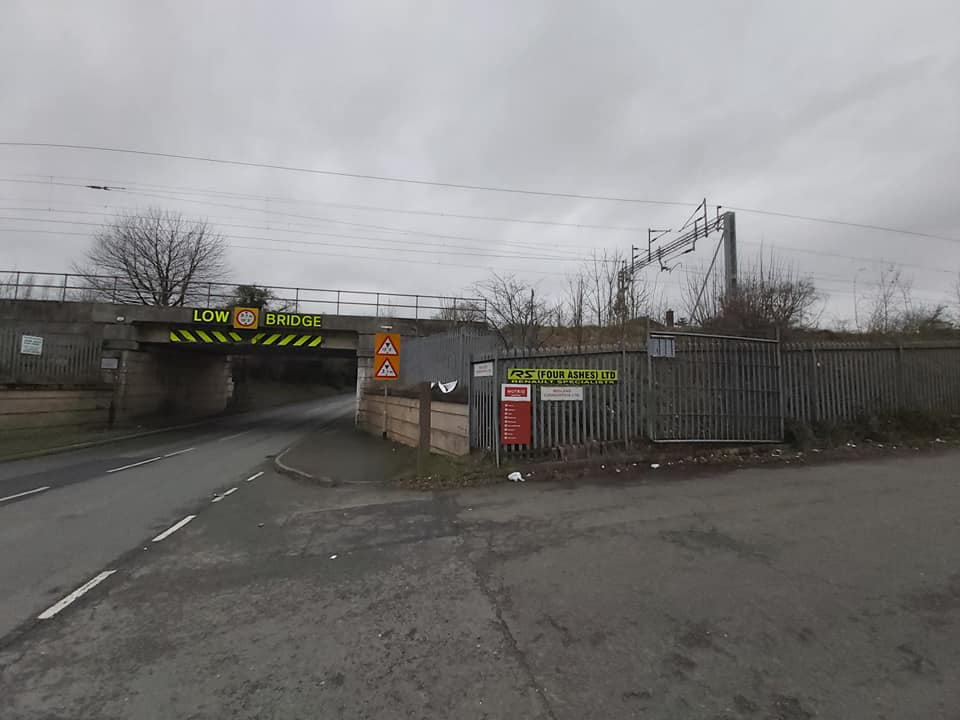
- Site of Four Ashes station

General information
- Location: Four Ashes, South Staffordshire; England
- Coordinates: 52.672879°N 2.124706°W
- Grid reference: SJ916084
- Platforms: 2

Other information
- Status: Disused

History
- Original company: Grand Junction Railway
- Pre-grouping: London and North Western Railway
- Post-grouping: London, Midland and Scottish Railway

Key dates
- 1837: Opened
- 1959: Closed to passenger traffic
Location

Four Ashes railway station was a railway station built by the Grand Junction Railway in 1837. It served the small village of Four Ashes, Staffordshire, 6 miles north of Wolverhampton City Centre, and was located near to the A449 road, on Station Drive. It was also the closest station to the villages of Coven and Featherstone as well as the town of Brewood.

The station closed in 1959, although the Rugby-Birmingham-Stafford Line loop from the West Coast Main Line still runs through the site of the station today.

Preceding station	Disused railways	Following station
Bushbury	London and North Western Railway former Grand Junction Railway	Gailey
