= Portobello, West Midlands =

Area of Wolverhampton, England

Coordinates: 52.5816°N 2.0741°W

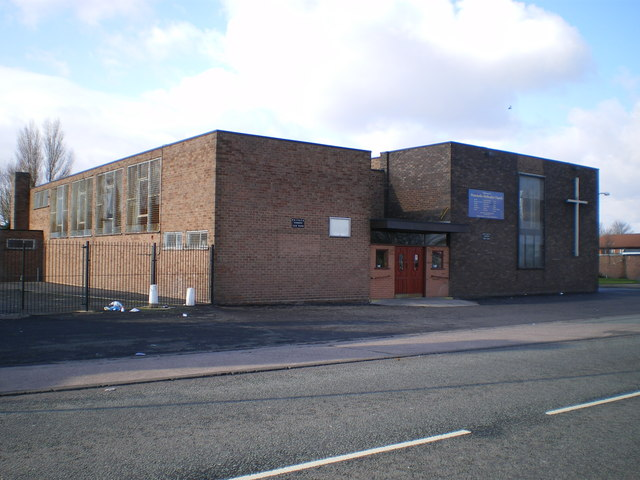
Portobello Methodist Church

Portobello is an area in Willenhall on the Wolverhampton side of the border, in the West Midlands, England. It is situated to the east of Wolverhampton city centre and to the north of Bilston, in the Bilston North ward of the city council. It was formerly part of Willenhall Urban District before Willenhall was split between Walsall and Wolverhampton.

Tall blocks of flats and shops in the area were at one point demolished. In 2018, the area began redevelopment, and an Aldi supermarket opposite the new housing development opened in December 2019.

== Education ==
Stow Heath Primary School is in Portobello on Hill road.

== Community facilities ==
Portobello has a community centre on Hill Road but it has been vacant since the previous community association left in December 2023.

== Transport ==
The nearest railway station was Wolverhampton, until Willenhall Bilston Street railway station reopened in April 2026.

The most prominent bus route is National Express West Midlands service 529 which stops at Portobello Island, linking Wolverhampton and Walsall. Diamond Bus West Midlands service 326 links to Bilston & Bloxwich, 303 to Bilston & Willenhall, and Carolean Coaches services 23 and 23A to Bilston, Willenhall & Wednesbury.
