= Saddlers Centre =

Coordinates: 52.584°N 1.984°W

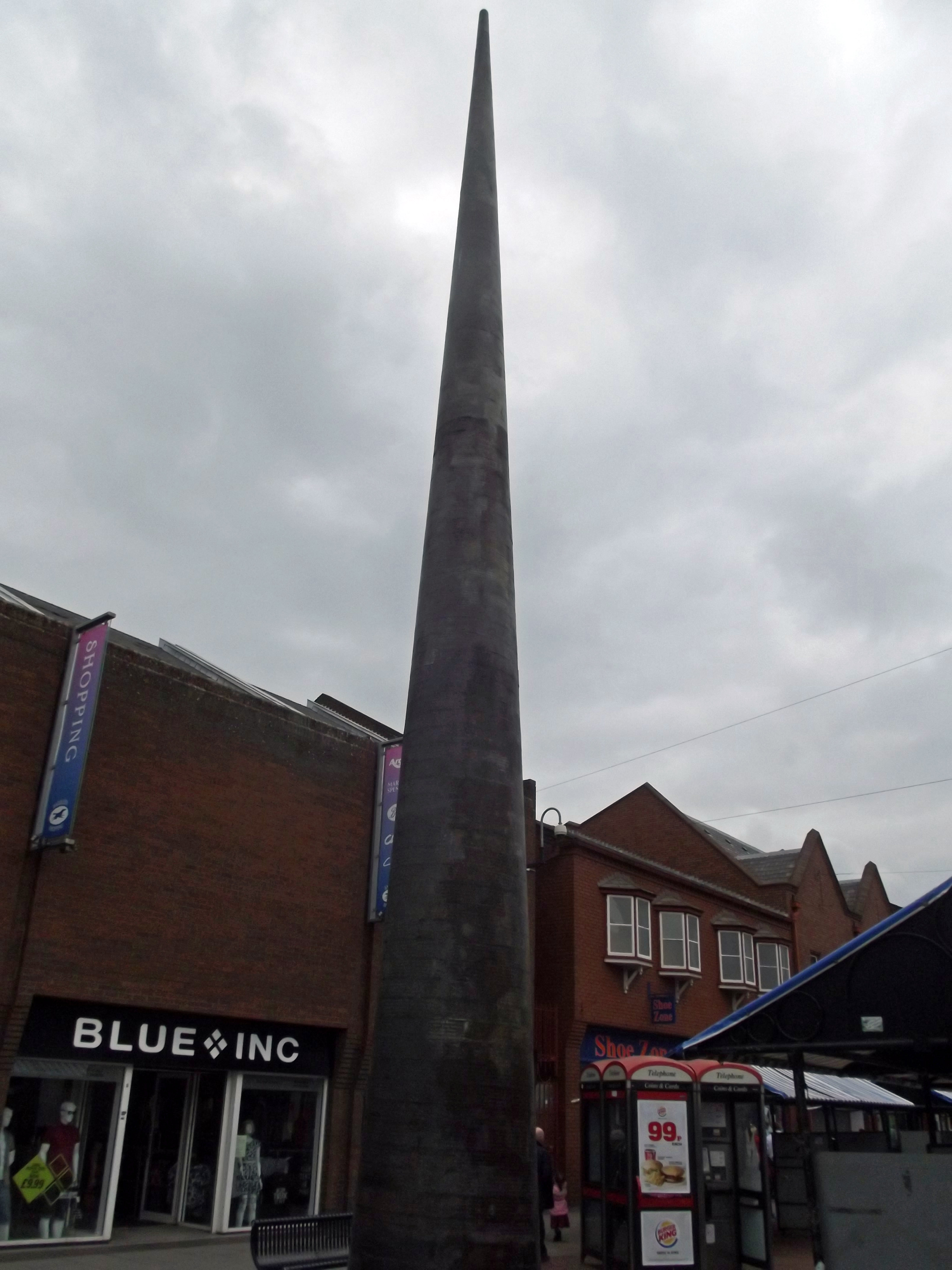
A bronze sculpture outside the shopping centre

The Saddlers Centre is a shopping centre located in Walsall, West Midlands, United Kingdom. The shopping centre takes its name from the town's saddle manufacturing heritage and is also known as the nickname for the town's football team Walsall FC.

The centre is spread over two floors with access to the top floor from Park Street, the town's main shopping area, while the lower floor is accessible from Bridge Street, next to Bradford Place Bus Station. The top floor of the complex is home to Walsall railway station. Also attached to the centre is a three-storey car park.

It opened in April 1980 and underwent refurbishment in 1989–90.

It was purchased by Walsall Council in 2017 for £13.8 million in a 'behind closed doors deal'. In 2018 the key tenant Marks & Spencer closed down leaving the centre with a valuation significantly lower than that paid less than 12 months earlier. The former Marks & Spencer building is planned to become an Adult Learning Centre in partnership with Walsall College, with the facility expected to open in September 2027.
