= Tame Bridge Parkway railway station =

Railway station in the West Midlands, England

Tame Bridge Parkway
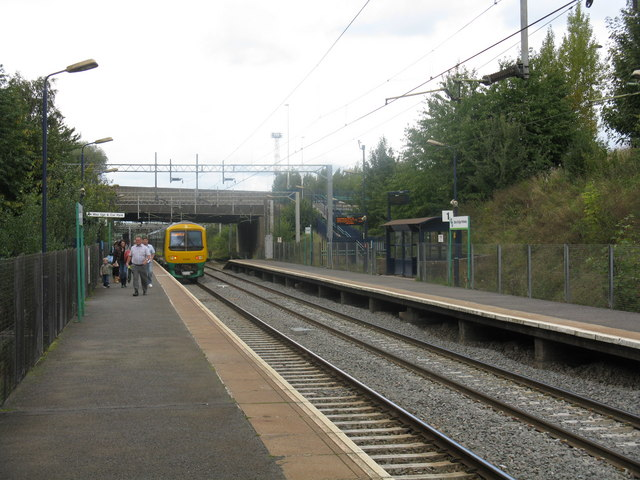

General information
- Location: Stone Cross, Sandwell; England
- Coordinates: 52.552257°N 1.975991°W
- Grid reference: SP017949
- Manager: West Midlands Railway
- Transit authority: Transport for West Midlands
- Platforms: 2

Other information
- Station code: TAB
- Fare zone: 4
- Classification: DfT category E

History
- Opened: 1990

Passengers
- 2021/22: ▲0.353 million
- 2022/23: ▲0.505 million
- 2023/24: ▲0.580 million
- 2024/25: ▲0.632 million
- Interchange: 42,805
- 2025/26: ▲0.727 million
- Interchange: 57,936
Location
Notes
- Passenger statistics from the Office of Rail and Road

Tame Bridge Parkway is a railway station in the north of the borough of Sandwell, in the West Midlands, England, close to the boundary with Walsall. The station is operated by West Midlands Railway. It is situated on the Chase Line 8.25 miles (13.28 km) north of Birmingham New Street, part of the former Grand Junction Railway, opened in 1837.

The station was opened by British Rail in 1990, having been built at a cost of £600,000. It takes its name from the nearby River Tame.

Pedestrian and vehicular access is via the A4031 Walsall Road.

In early 2023, land adjacent to the station was used as a filming location for the BBC One drama This Town, produced by Steven Knight.

== Services ==
As of October 2024, the following services call at this station on Mondays to Saturdays:

- 2tph to Wolverhampton via Aston and Birmingham New Street, calling at all stations.
- 2tph to Birmingham International, non-stop to Birmingham New Street.
- 2tph to Walsall calling at all stations.
- 2tph to Rugeley Trent Valley, non-stop to Walsall and then calling at all stations.
- 1tph non-stop to Birmingham New Street. (Mon-Sat)
- 1 tph to Shrewsbury, calling all stations via Wolverhampton. (Mon-Sat)

On Sundays services are 1tph for each of the above.

All current services are provided by West Midlands Trains under the brand West Midlands Railway.

In 2019, some services ran to and from Coventry or London Euston, and were therefore branded as London Northwestern Railway services.

The station was previously served by trains between Birmingham New Street and Crewe, via Stoke-on-Trent, but the service was cut back to starting at Stafford in the December 2023 timetable change.

Nearby bus stops on the Walsall Road offer regular bus links on services 4, 4H, 4M and 45 to Walsall, West Bromwich, Oldbury, Blackheath, Halesowen and Merry Hill Centre.

Preceding station	National Rail	Following station
Walsall towards Rugeley Trent Valley	West Midlands Railway Chase Line	Birmingham New Street non-stop
Bescot Stadium towards Walsall	West Midlands Railway Chase Line	Hamstead towards Birmingham New Street via Aston
Darlaston towards Shrewsbury	West Midlands Railway Birmingham–Shrewsbury	Birmingham New Street Terminus
