= Walsall railway station =

Railway station in the West Midlands, England

Coordinates: 52.5840°N 1.9851°W

Walsall
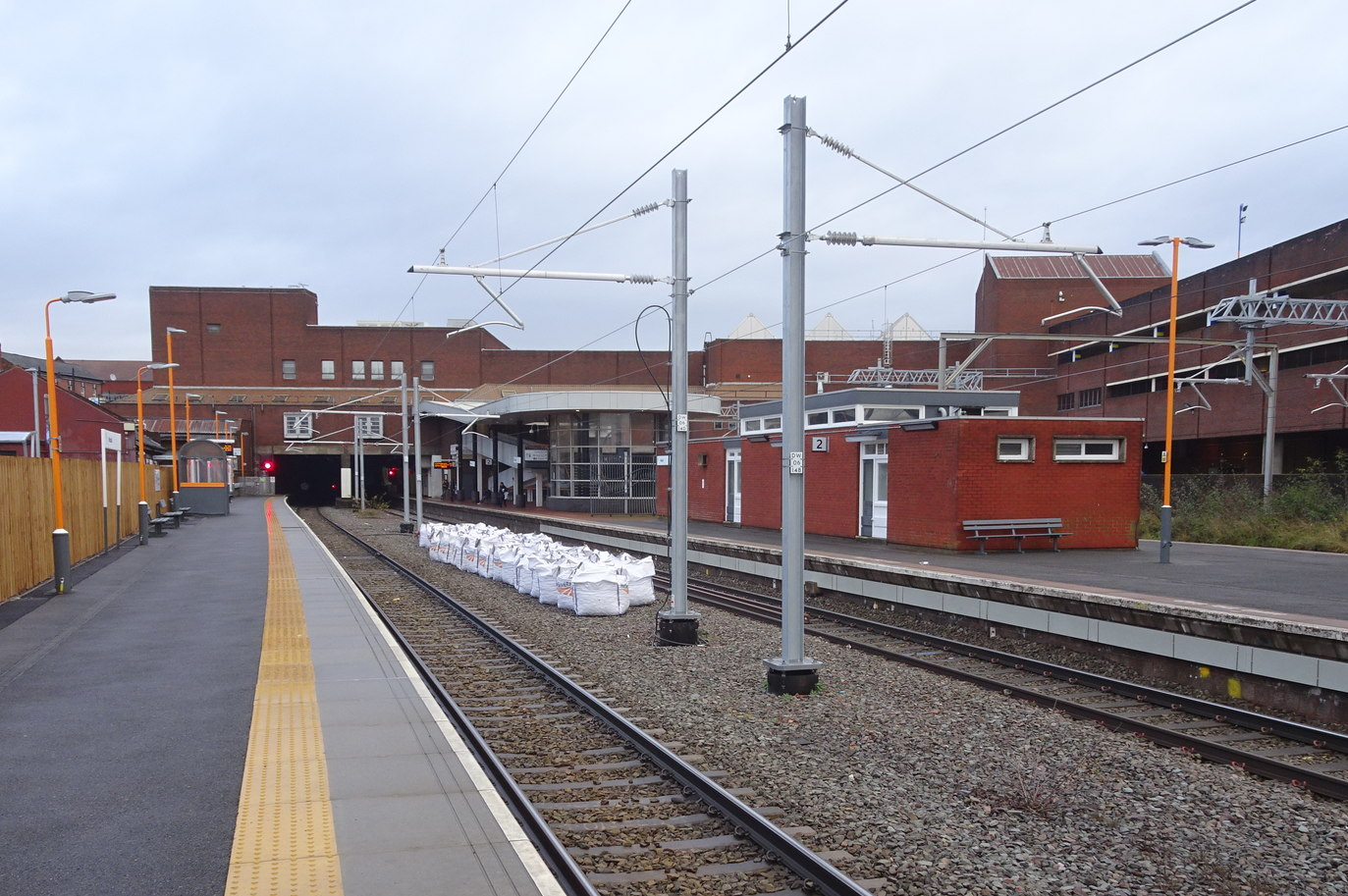
- Walsall station in January 2019.

General information
- Location: Walsall, Metropolitan Borough of Walsall; England
- Grid reference: SP010984
- Manager: West Midlands Railway
- Transit authority: Transport for West Midlands
- Platforms: 3

Other information
- Station code: WSL
- Fare zone: 4
- Classification: DfT category D

History
- Original company: South Staffordshire Railway
- Pre-grouping: London and North Western Railway
- Post-grouping: London, Midland and Scottish Railway

Key dates
- 9 April 1849: Opened

Passengers
- 2021/22: ▲0.804 million
- 2022/23: ▲0.971 million
- 2023/24: ▲1.148 million
- 2024/25: ▲1.240 million
- 2025/26: ▲1.355 million
Location
Notes
- Passenger statistics from the Office of Rail and Road

Walsall railway station serves the town of Walsall, in the West Midlands, England. It is managed by West Midlands Trains, which also operates all services that stop here under the West Midlands Railway brand. The main entrance is situated inside the Saddlers Shopping Centre, in the middle of the town.

== History ==
The Grand Junction Railway provided the town with its first rail service, albeit indirectly from 1837. Their Birmingham-to-Warrington line passed to the south and was provided with a station at Bescot Bridge, near to the present Bescot Stadium station, from where travellers could catch a connecting stagecoach. The Grand Junction company laid a branch line from Bescot to a temporary depot in the town at Bridgeman Place a decade later, but it was not until 9 April 1849 that a permanent station was opened on the present site. This was completed by the South Staffordshire Railway as part of their route from Wichnor Junction, south of Burton-upon-Trent, to Dudley, which opened the same day.

Further route development followed; the SSR added a branch northwards to Cannock in 1858, which was extended to Rugeley the following autumn, whilst the Wolverhampton and Walsall Railway line linked the town to Wolverhampton via North Walsall in 1872. The network was completed by the Midland Railway; the line from Castle Bromwich via Aldridge opened in 1879.

The Midland had by this time also purchased the W&WR from its rival London and North Western Railway (LNWR), though the LNWR still ran occasional services over it until the 1923 Grouping. The station was rebuilt in 1883, due to increasing traffic levels, with five platforms and separate booking offices for each of the two companies using it. A fire damaged the main booking hall in 1916, but it was not until after World War I had ended in 1918 that a full rebuild of the concourse could be effected. The new booking hall was completed and opened in 1923.

Under the London, Midland and Scottish Railway's auspices, the Midland line to Wolverhampton, via Wednesfield and Willenhall Stafford Street, closed to passengers in 1931; this was because it was less direct than the older Grand Junction line via Darlaston.

The line from Birmingham was electrified in 1966, as part of the London Midland Region's electrification programme. The line from Coventry to Walsall, through Aston, was energised on 15 August 1966.

The station was redeveloped and incorporated into the Saddlers Centre shopping centre in 1980.

In the late 1980s and into the 1990s, vast improvements were made to the quality of services from Walsall. In April 1989, passenger services were reintroduced by British Rail on the previously freight-only line to Hednesford 24 years after they were withdrawn. The number of trains to Birmingham was gradually increased from one to four trains per hour, the Hednesford service was extended to Rugeley in 1997 and subsequently through to Stafford; however, the service to Stafford was cut back in 2008 to Rugeley Trent Valley, under an agreement with London Midland and WCML operators. Only the now-withdrawn daily Liverpool Lime Street services connected Walsall directly with Stafford.

Passenger services to Wolverhampton were reintroduced in 1998 which also ran on occasions to Wellington, but this service was short lived and the regular hourly service was withdrawn again in 2008, due to low passenger numbers. However, one train per day ran straight to Wolverhampton from Walsall in the evening, leaving Walsall at 19.36, until the May 2013 timetable change, as a parliamentary train to avoid the need for formal closure proceedings. This now runs in the opposite direction on Saturdays only (06.38 ex-Wolverhampton). The West Midlands Combined Authority still has ambitions to reinstate a regular (half-hourly) weekday service on the route and reopen the stations at Willenhall and Darlaston, but funding problems have precluded any action being taken on the proposals.

In the May 2019 timetable, there were services to London Euston which called at Bescot Stadium and Tame Bridge Parkway on the Chase Line before it continuing to Coventry, Rugby, Hampton-in-Arden, Northampton, Milton Keynes and London Euston. This has been withdrawn and instead starts from New Street.

There were plans to introduce direct services to London Euston operated by Avanti West Coast in 2021; however in the December 2022 timetable changes, it was decided this would not go ahead.

There were also two morning services a day to Telford Central and Shrewsbury, via Birmingham and Wolverhampton. This service was also introduced in the timetable change in May 2019; they were operated as extensions of the Shrewsbury to Wolverhampton Line, replacing the former Liverpool Lime Street service. However in December 2019, following problems with services and disruptions, the Walsall service was once again withdrawn; this was replaced by a through Rugeley Trent Valley to Wolverhampton service.

=== Incidents ===
On 23 December 1854, a double headed southbound goods train from the north was held outside the station, with a second goods train drawn up behind it. A third goods train collided with the rear of the second, at speed, forcing it into the first. The fireman of the second of the engines of the third train, on his first turn in the role, was killed after jumping from his engine. The driver of the leading engine was charged with manslaughter. The case against him was dropped.

=== Beeching Axe and closures ===
Walsall was one of the towns most affected by the Beeching Axe, which resulted in passenger services being withdrawn on the line to Dudley in July 1964 and on the Wolverhampton-Walsall-Lichfield City-Burton-upon-Trent and Walsall-Sutton Park-Birmingham routes in January 1965.

The service to Rugeley Trent Valley was also closed to passengers on the same date, leaving towns like Bloxwich, Cannock, Hednesford and Rugeley without a railway connection. The remaining service to Birmingham was also reduced to hourly in the 1970s and almost withdrawn until it was saved and later improved.

The section to Lichfield remained open to freight traffic until 1984, when the line from Ryecroft Junction to Newtown, Brownhills closed to all traffic and the line was lifted and the stations (except Hammerwich) were demolished. The section from Newtown, Brownhills continued to serve Charringtons Oil Terminal until the closure of the terminal in 2001. The line was then mothballed and put out of use.

The section to Stourbridge remained open to serve as a diversion for freight and served the now-demolished Dudley Freightliner Terminal until 1993, when the route between Bescot/Walsall and the Round Oak steel terminal was taken out of use and mothballed.

== Layout and facilities ==
The station has three platforms:

- 1: operating northbound, semi-fast services from Birmingham New Street to Rugeley Trent Valley;
- 2: operating southbound, semi-fast services from Rugeley Trent Valley to Birmingham New Street;
- 3: a terminus platform, operating local services to Wolverhampton via Birmingham New Street.

Platforms 2 and 3 have been recently refurbished, with a new waiting room added and poems on the walls of the stairs to the platforms. The main line platforms are electrified to 25 kV AC overhead power.

A self-service ticket machine was placed on platform 1 but was no longer in place in April 2011; however, a similar machine remains in the station booking hall which is at street level above platform 3. The station has a staffed ticket office.

== Services ==
West Midlands Railway operates the following service pattern:

Mondays to Saturdays:

- 4 trains per hour (tph) southbound to Birmingham New Street, of which:
  - 2 tph to Birmingham International, running fast to New Street calling at Tame Bridge Parkway before stopping at local stations to Birmingham International.
  - 2 tph to Wolverhampton, calling at all stations
- 2 tph to Rugeley Trent Valley, calling at all stations.

Sundays:

- Services run hourly in both directions.

The fast trains to Birmingham have occasional calls at Bescot Stadium and are routed via the direct line through Soho and Winson Green. The local stopping trains run via Aston on its route to Birmingham New Street.

Commuters to London have to change at Rugeley Trent Valley, Wolverhampton or Birmingham New Street.

Preceding station	National Rail	Following station
Bloxwich	West Midlands Railway; Rugeley – Walsall – Birmingham; Chase Line	Tame Bridge Parkway
Bloxwich	West Midlands Railway; Rugeley – Walsall – Birmingham – Wolverhampton; Chase Line; Limited service	Tame Bridge Parkway
Terminus	West Midlands Railway Walsall – Aston – Birmingham – Wolverhampton	Bescot Stadium
	Future services	
Terminus	West Midlands Railway Walsall–Wolverhampton line	Darlaston
Terminus	West Midlands Railway Walsall–Wolverhampton line	Tame Bridge Parkway
Disused railways
Rushall Line and station closed	London and North Western Railway South Staffordshire Line	Wednesbury Town Line and station closed
Terminus	London and North Western Railway South Staffordshire Line	Wednesbury Town Line and station closed
Aldridge Line and station closed	Midland Railway Sutton Park Line	Terminus
North Walsall Line and station closed	Midland Railway Wolverhampton and Walsall Railway	Terminus

== Future proposals ==
There are plans to reopen a terminus single platform at the disused Aldridge station for trains to Birmingham New Street, via Walsall but not to Sutton Coldfield and Water Orton.

In a strategy conducted by the West Midlands Combined Authority, the line from Walsall to Lichfield has been identified as a disused rail corridor and this means that it is a long term ambition to reopen the line from Walsall to Lichfield, either a rail/light rail corridor. There are also aspirations to reconnect the disused line at Wednesbury to Walsall as either rail or tram.

There are also proposals to reintroduce services to Wolverhampton via Willenhall, with reopened stations at Darlaston and Willenhall, operated by West Midlands Railway. This would give passengers a faster service to Wolverhampton as opposed to the current service via Birmingham New Street. This was due to open in 2024.

== Gallery ==
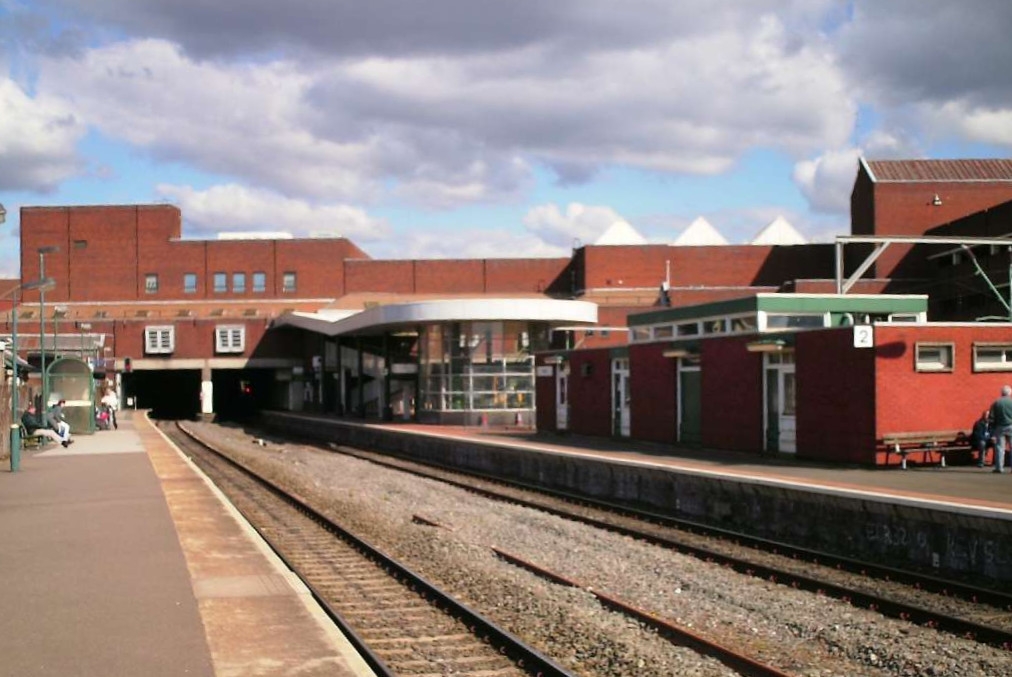
A view from platform 1 looking north towards the tunnel under the Saddlers Centre, in March 2007

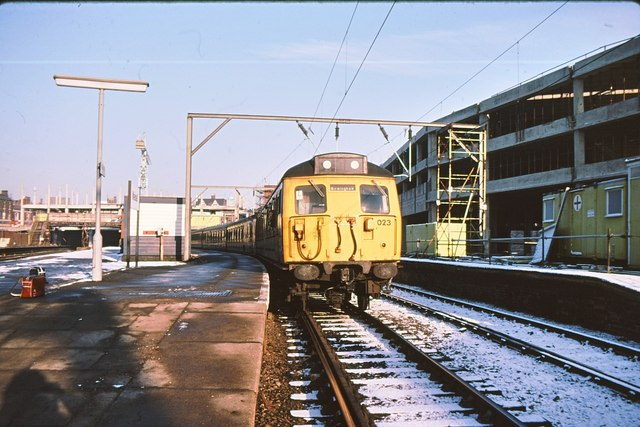
A Class 304 electric multiple unit at Walsall, in 1979

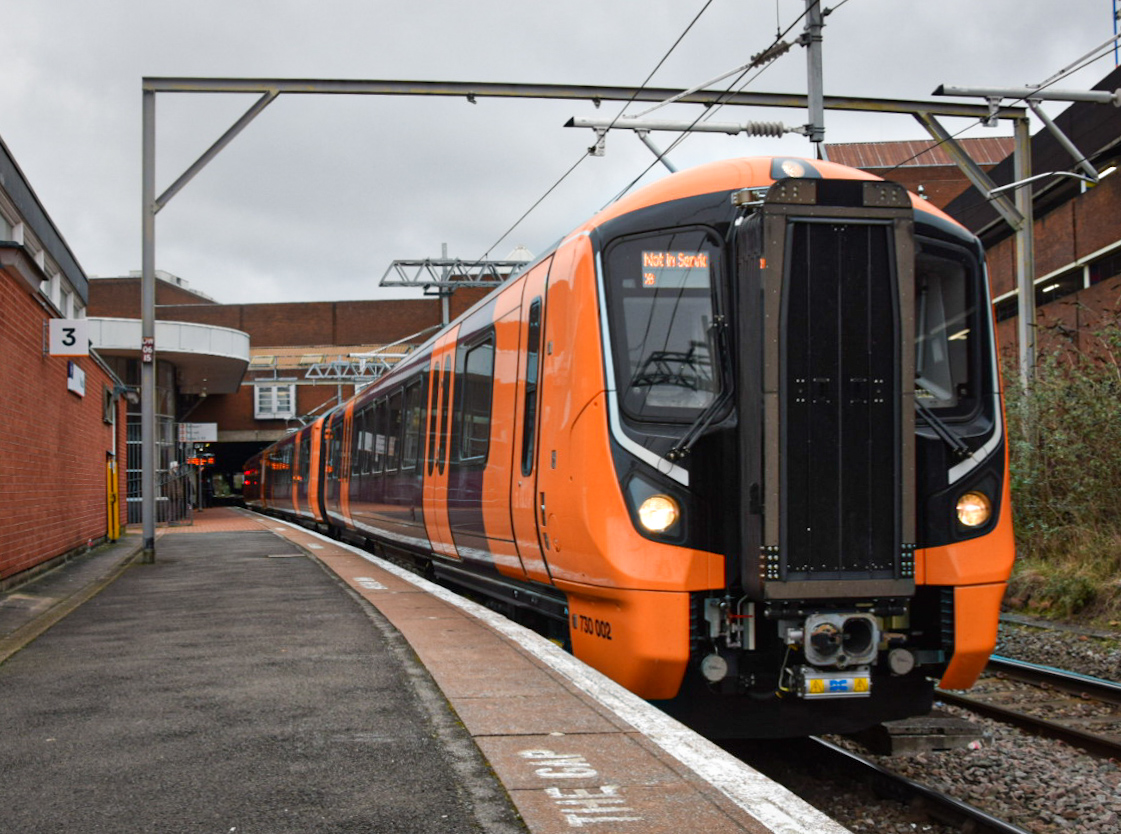
A Class 730 being tested at Walsall, on 19 March 2021
