= Wolverhampton station =

Railway station and tram stop in the West Midlands, England

Wolverhampton
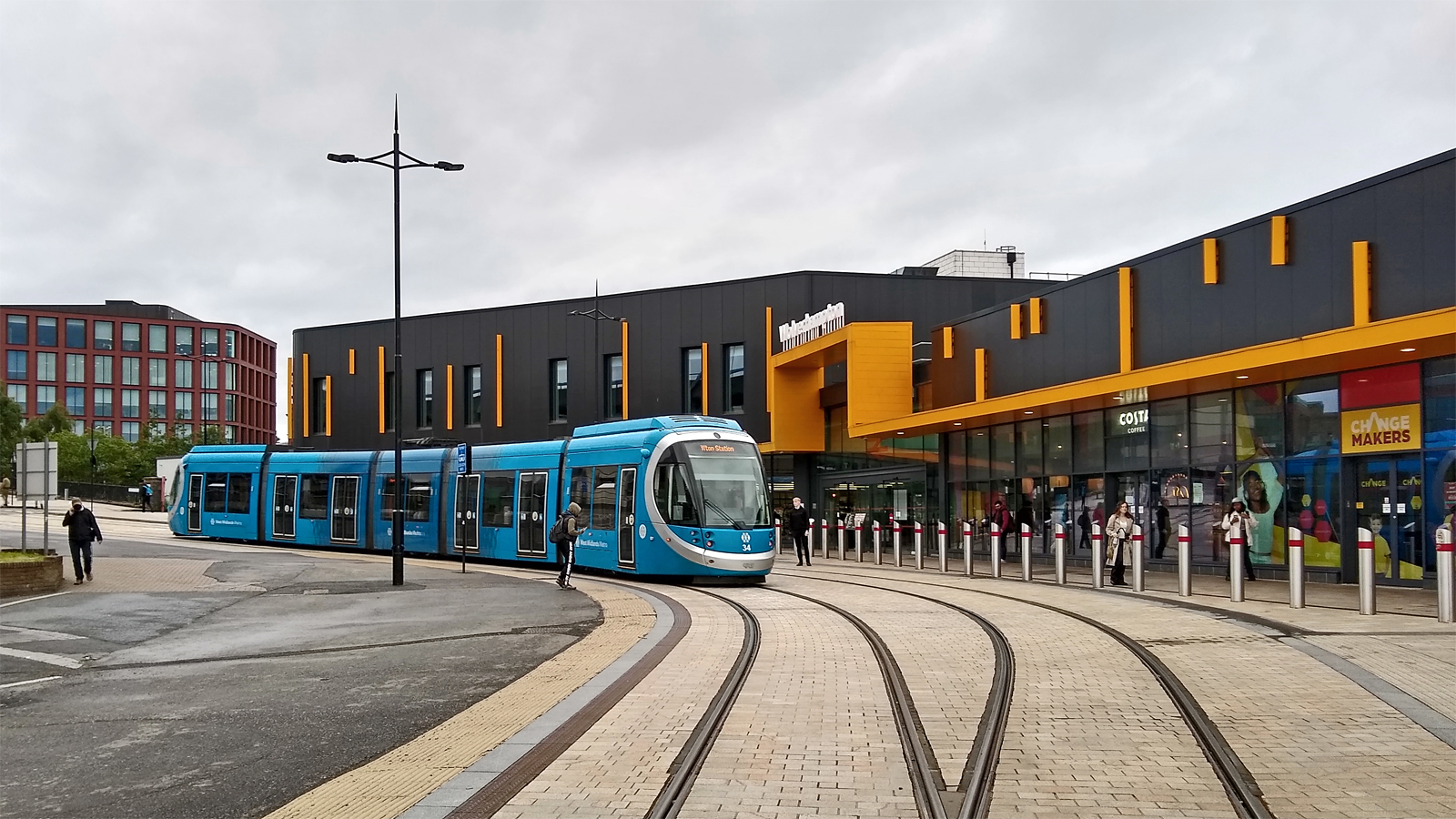
- The new station building, opened in 2021, with a CAF Urbos 3 tram

General information
- Location: Wolverhampton, City of Wolverhampton, England
- Coordinates: 52.5875°N 2.1200°W
- Grid reference: SO919988
- Manager: West Midlands Railway
- Transit authority: Transport for West Midlands
- Platforms: 6

Other information
- Station code: WVH
- Fare zone: 5
- Classification: DfT category B

History
- Original company: Birmingham, Wolverhampton and Stour Valley Railway
- Pre-grouping: London and North Western Railway
- Post-grouping: London, Midland and Scottish Railway

Key dates
- 1 July 1852: Opened as Wolverhampton (Queen Street)
- 1 June 1885: Renamed Wolverhampton (High Level)
- 1964-67: Redeveloped
- 7 May 1973: Renamed Wolverhampton
- 2018-21: Redeveloped
- 17 September 2023: West Midlands Metro services started

Passengers
- 2021/22: ▲3.453 million
- Interchange: ▲0.187 million
- 2022/23: ▲4.446 million
- Interchange: ▲0.222 million
- 2023/24: ▲4.771 million
- Interchange: ▲0.228 million
- 2024/25: ▲5.249 million
- Interchange: ▲0.298 million
- 2025/26: ▲5.913 million
- Interchange: ▲0.322 million
Location
Notes
- Passenger statistics from the Office of Rail and Road

Wolverhampton is a regional interchange railway station serving the city of Wolverhampton, in the West Midlands, England. Historically known as Wolverhampton High Level, it lies on the Birmingham Loop of the West Coast Main Line. It is the fourth-busiest station in the West Midlands region and is served by Avanti West Coast, CrossCountry, Transport for Wales and West Midlands Trains. There is a West Midlands Metro tram stop located outside the station and an elevated walkway towards Wolverhampton bus station.

== History ==
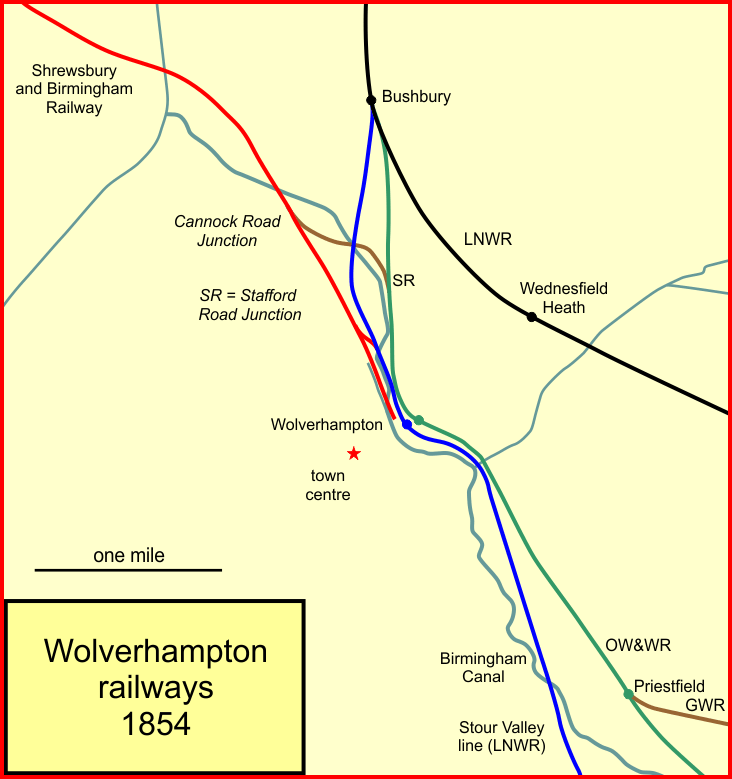
Wolverhampton railways in 1854

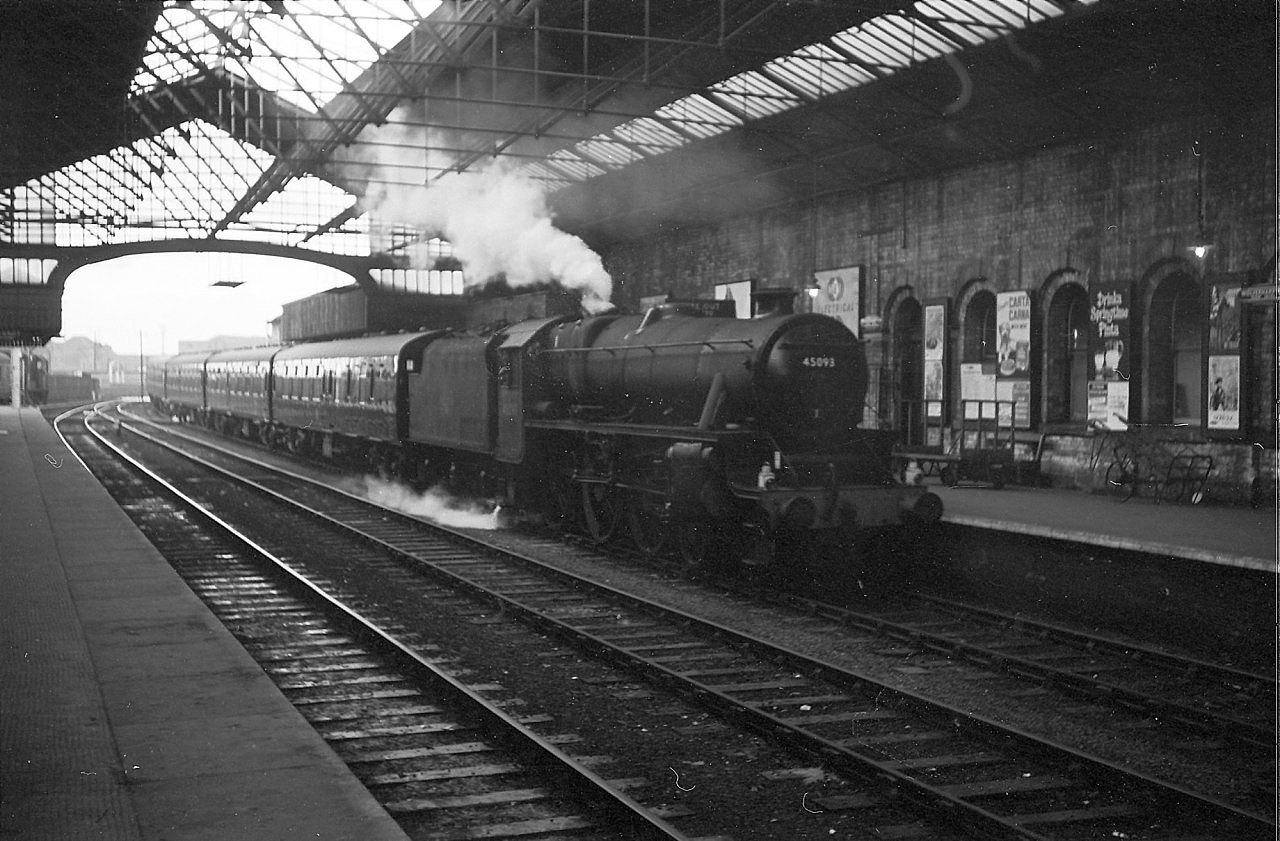
Wolverhampton High Level Station in 1963

The first station named Wolverhampton opened on the edge of the town centre in 1837 on the Grand Junction Railway. This station was renamed Wednesfield Heath in 1855, shortly after the present station was opened, and subsequently closed in 1873.

On 12 November 1849, the Shrewsbury and Birmingham Railway opened a temporary terminus to its line at a location very close to the present station.

The present site was opened on 1 July 1852 by the Birmingham, Wolverhampton and Stour Valley Railway, a subsidiary of the London and North Western Railway (LNWR); it was named Wolverhampton Queen Street. The only visible remnant of the original station is the Queen's Building, the gateway to Railway Drive, which was the approach road to the station. The building was originally the carriage entrance to the station and was completed three years before the main station building. Today, it forms part of Wolverhampton bus station.

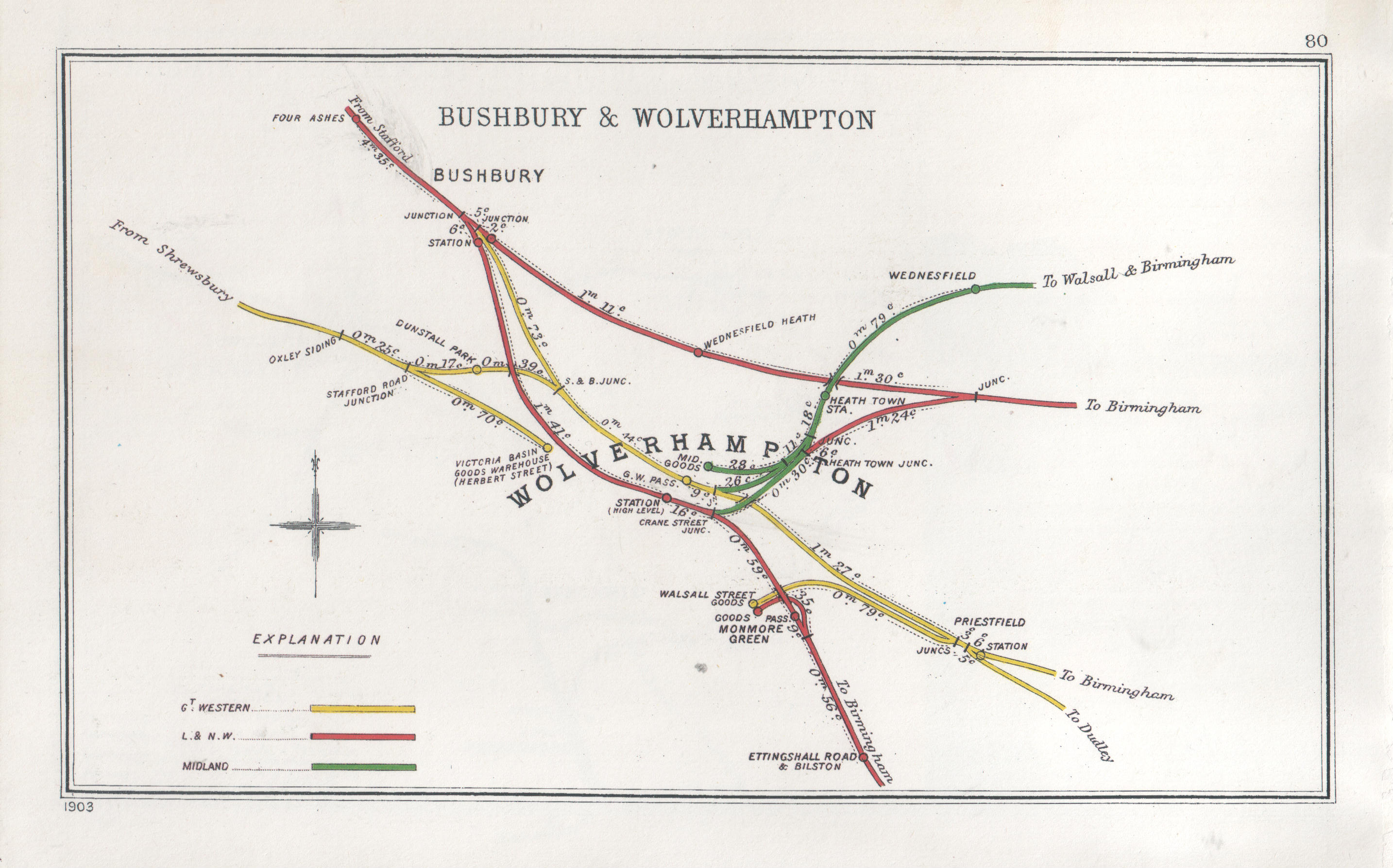
A diagram of railways around central Wolverhampton from 1914; High Level is the red station near the centre

Two years later, on 1 July 1854, the Oxford, Worcester and Wolverhampton Railway (OWWR) opened a second station, located behind the older station on lower ground, which became known as the Wolverhampton Low Level station from April 1856, the other becoming known as Wolverhampton High Level from 1 June 1885.

From 1923, the LNWR was amalgamated into the London Midland and Scottish Railway (LMS) and in 1948 it became part of the London Midland Region of British Railways.

Services over the former Grand Junction Railway line to Walsall (and thence to Lichfield City and Burton-on-Trent) ended in January 1965; this route was the only one from here to fall victim to the Beeching Axe.

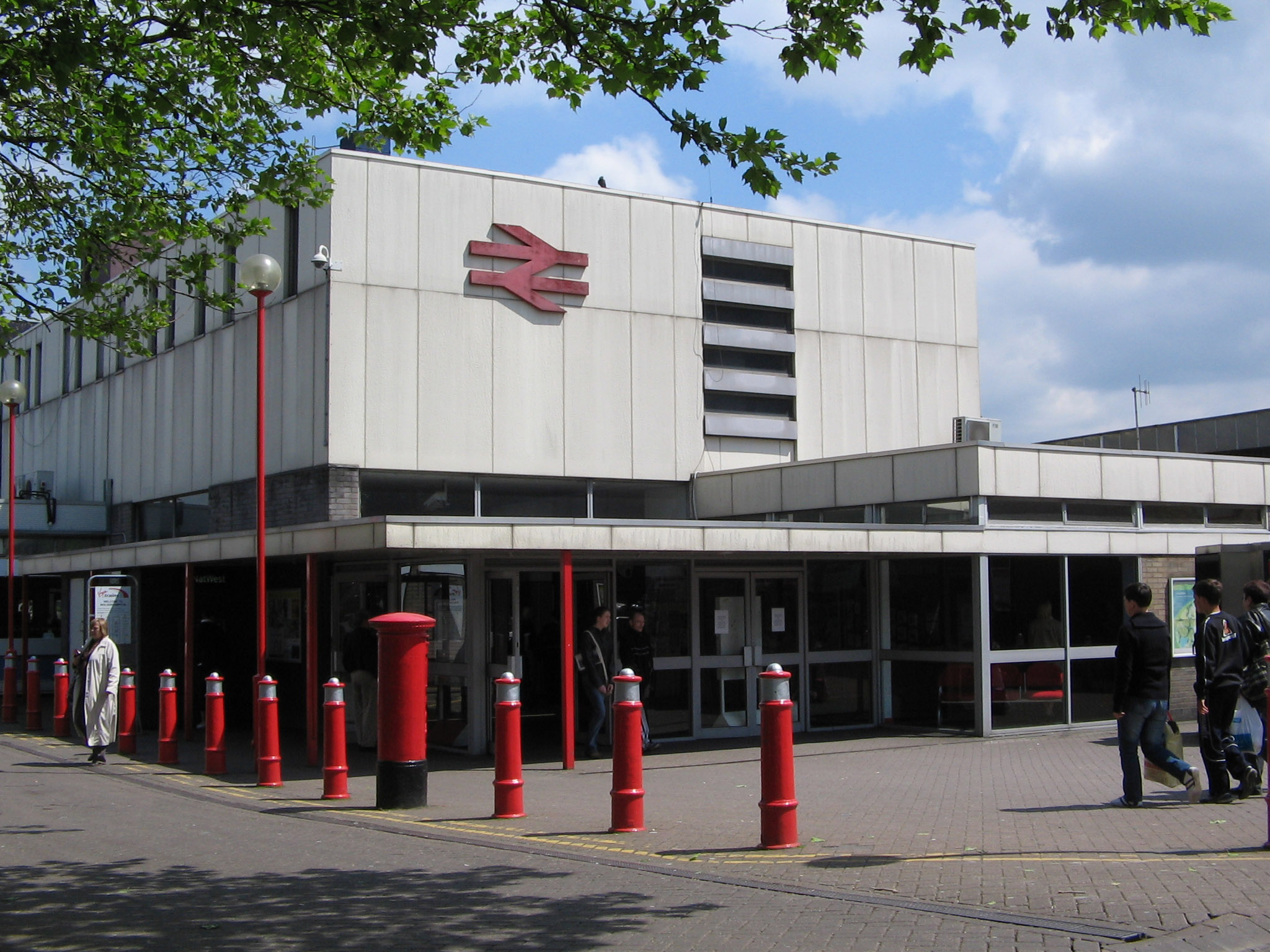
The former station building of 1964–67 by Ray Moorcroft; it was demolished in 2020

The station dated from 1964, when the High Level station was completely rebuilt by the architect Ray Moorcroft as part of a modernisation programme that saw the West Coast Main Line electrified. It consisted of three through platforms (the present platforms 1, 2 and 3). As part of this scheme, most services on the OW&WR route from Shrewsbury were diverted here from Low Level station, although a few peak-hour trains continued to serve the latter until March 1968; these then continued to Birmingham New Street via the Stour Valley line rather than via the ex-GWR line to Birmingham Snow Hill as before.

In the 1980s, a parcels siding was converted into a south-facing bay platform (the present platform 5), and a new north-facing bay was constructed (the present platform 6).

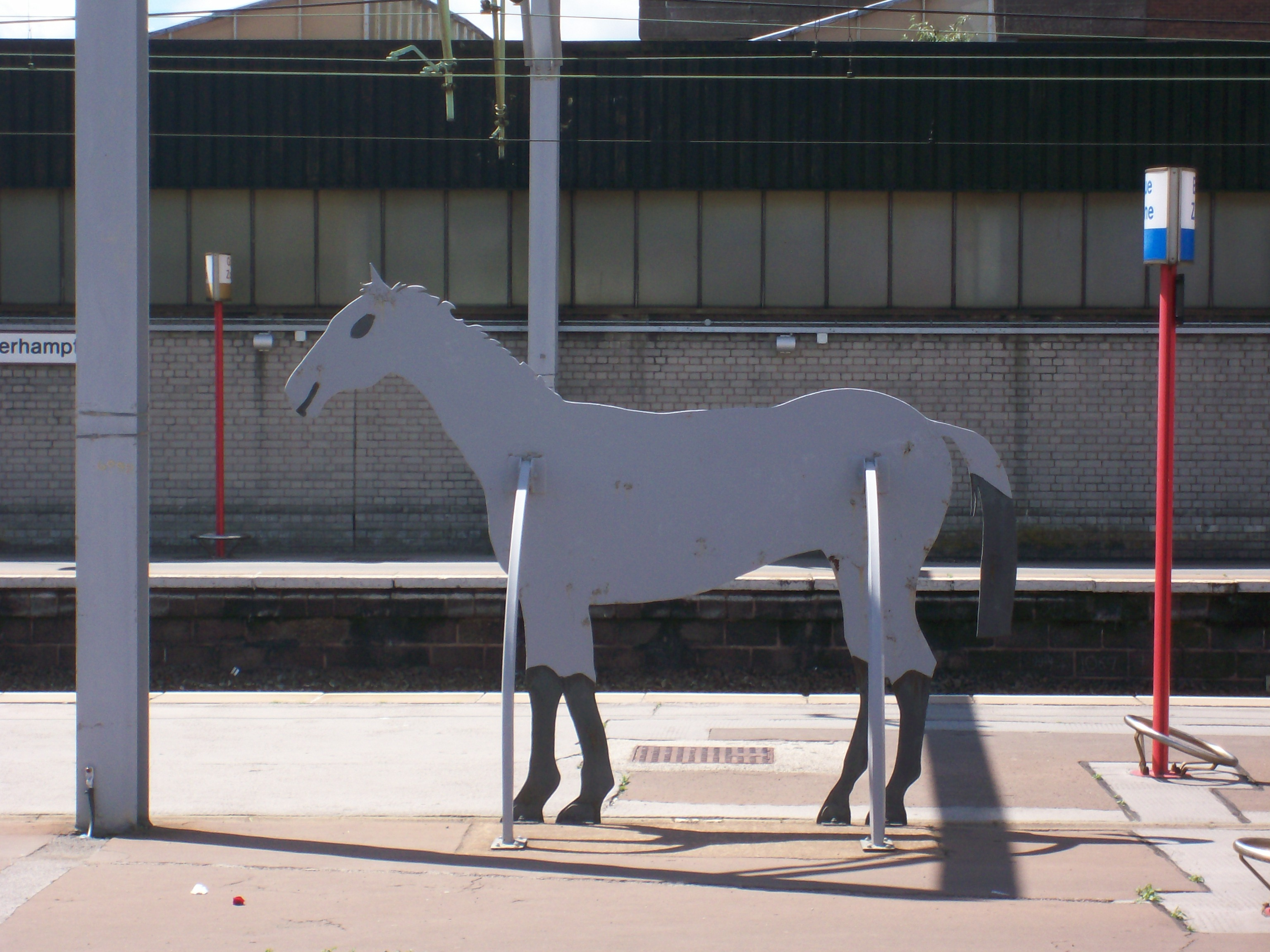
One of Kevin Atherton's Iron Horse sculptures

In 1987, twelve different horse sculptures by Kevin Atherton, titled Iron Horse, were erected between New Street and Wolverhampton, including one at the southern end of platforms 2 and 3.

More recently, in 2004, a new through platform (no. 4) was constructed on the site of infrequently used sidings. This has greatly enhanced the capacity of the station. A new footbridge was also constructed, to enable access to the new platform as well as improving access to the existing ones. A proposal for a more comprehensive redevelopment of the station and surrounding area was announced on 18 October 2006.

Work on the £150 million redevelopment of the station finally began in 2018; it was expected to be completed in 2020 and include an extension of the West Midlands Metro. However, COVID-19 requirements caused the work to be delayed. Demolition of the 1960s buildings began in May 2020, with the first part of the new station opening the same month. The new station building was fully opened in June 2021, a year later than originally planned. Its aluminium façade is in black and gold, the traditional colours of Wolverhampton Wanderers.

Despite the new station building, the platforms and structures from the 1960s station building remain largely untouched. As of 2025, there were no confirmed plans to refurbish those structures or to bring them in-keeping with the new concourse.

Management of the station transferred from Virgin Trains to West Midlands Trains in April 2018.

== Layout ==
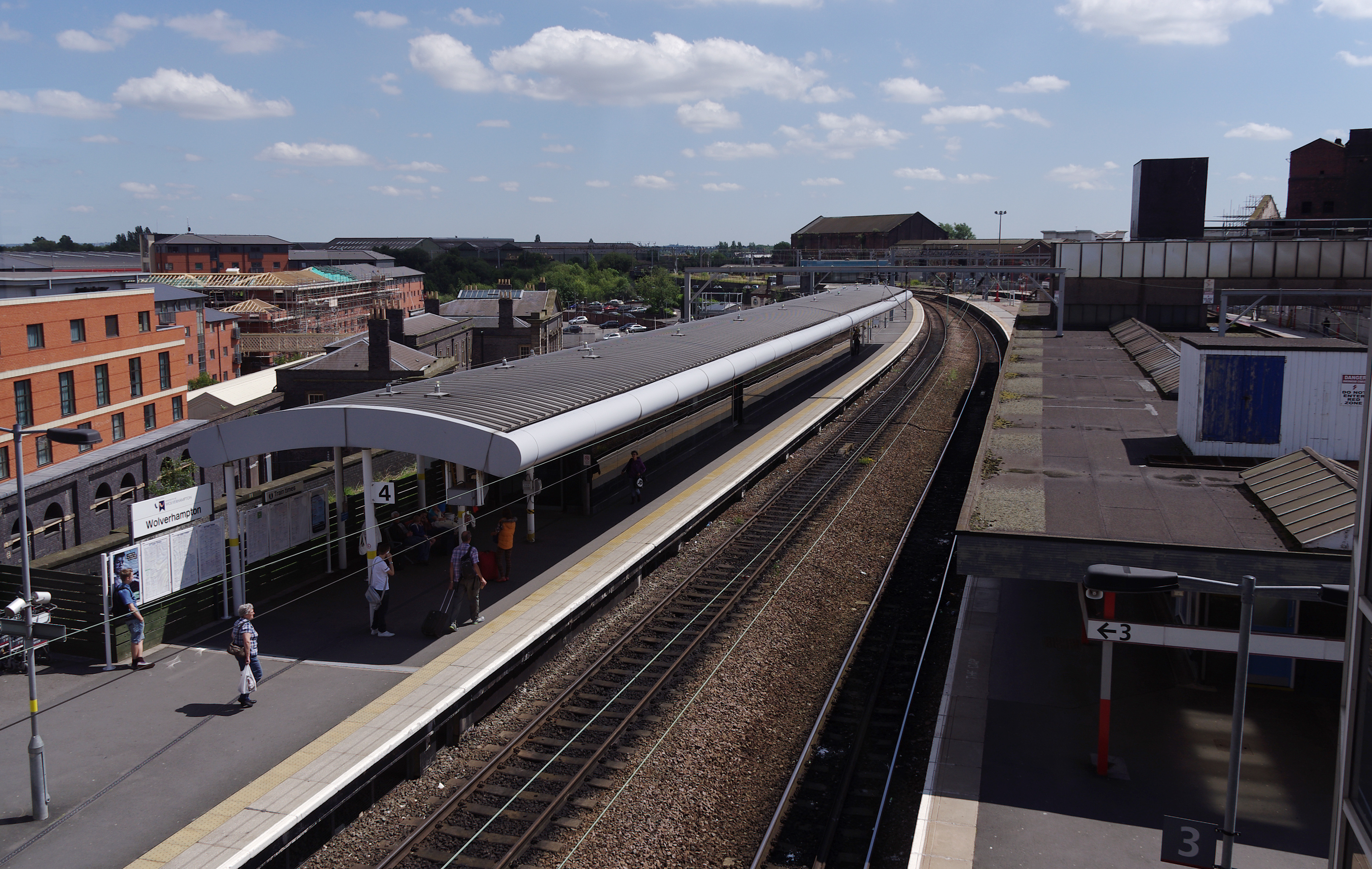
A view of platform 4 (left)

The station has six platforms:

- 1 to 4 are through platforms
- 5 and 6 are bay platforms at the south and north ends respectively.

Although all four through platforms are reversible, the following generally applies in practice:

1. is used for northbound services; in the late evenings and on Sundays, there are still a few Avanti West Coast services that either terminate in platforms 1 or 2. These trains usually travel to London Euston, via Birmingham New Street
2. for northbound and southbound services
3. for southbound services and for northbound services at busy times
4. for southbound services; used for all Avanti West Coast services from Edinburgh/Glasgow to London Euston
5. used by local services to Walsall, via Birmingham New Street
6. was designed for local services on the Wolverhampton to Shrewsbury Line (formerly numbered 4, but renumbered in 2004), but is now rarely used as the majority of services on that route travel through to Birmingham or occasionally to Walsall. It is generally used for the first service of the day to Shrewsbury and for holding trains when they are not in use.

All lines at the station are electrified overhead at 25 kV AC.

== Services ==
=== National Rail ===
The station is served by four train operating companies, which provide the following general off-peak services in trains per hour/day (tph/tpd):

Avanti West Coast

- 1 tph to London Euston, via Birmingham New Street
- 1 tp2h to Edinburgh Waverley, via Wigan North Western
- 1 tp2h to Glasgow Central, via Wigan North Western

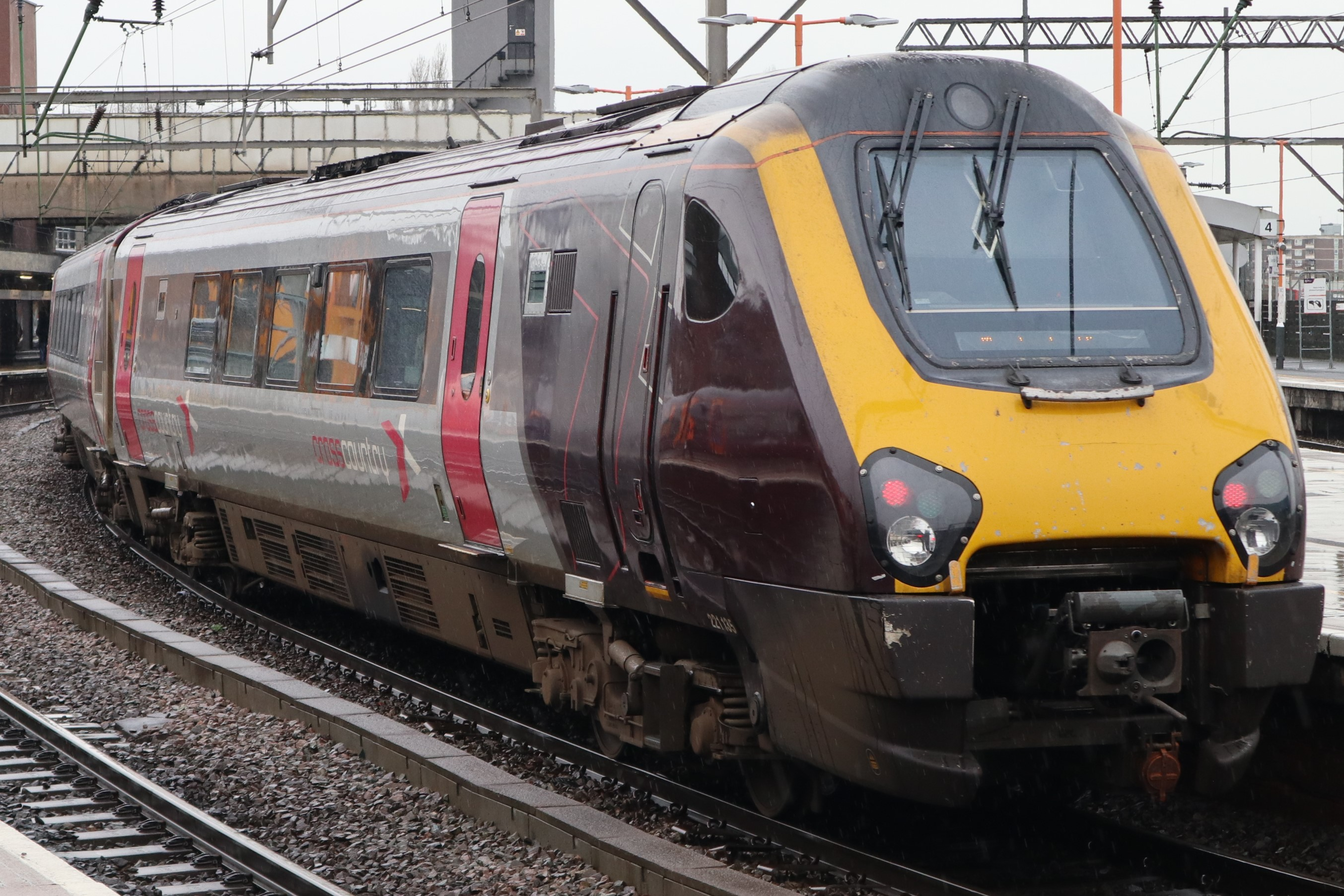
A CrossCountry Super Voyager diesel multiple unit in 2024

CrossCountry:

- 1 tph to Bournemouth, via Birmingham New Street and Coventry
- 1 tph to Bristol Temple Meads via Birmingham New Street and Cheltenham Spa
- 2 tph to Manchester Piccadilly, via Stoke-on-Trent.

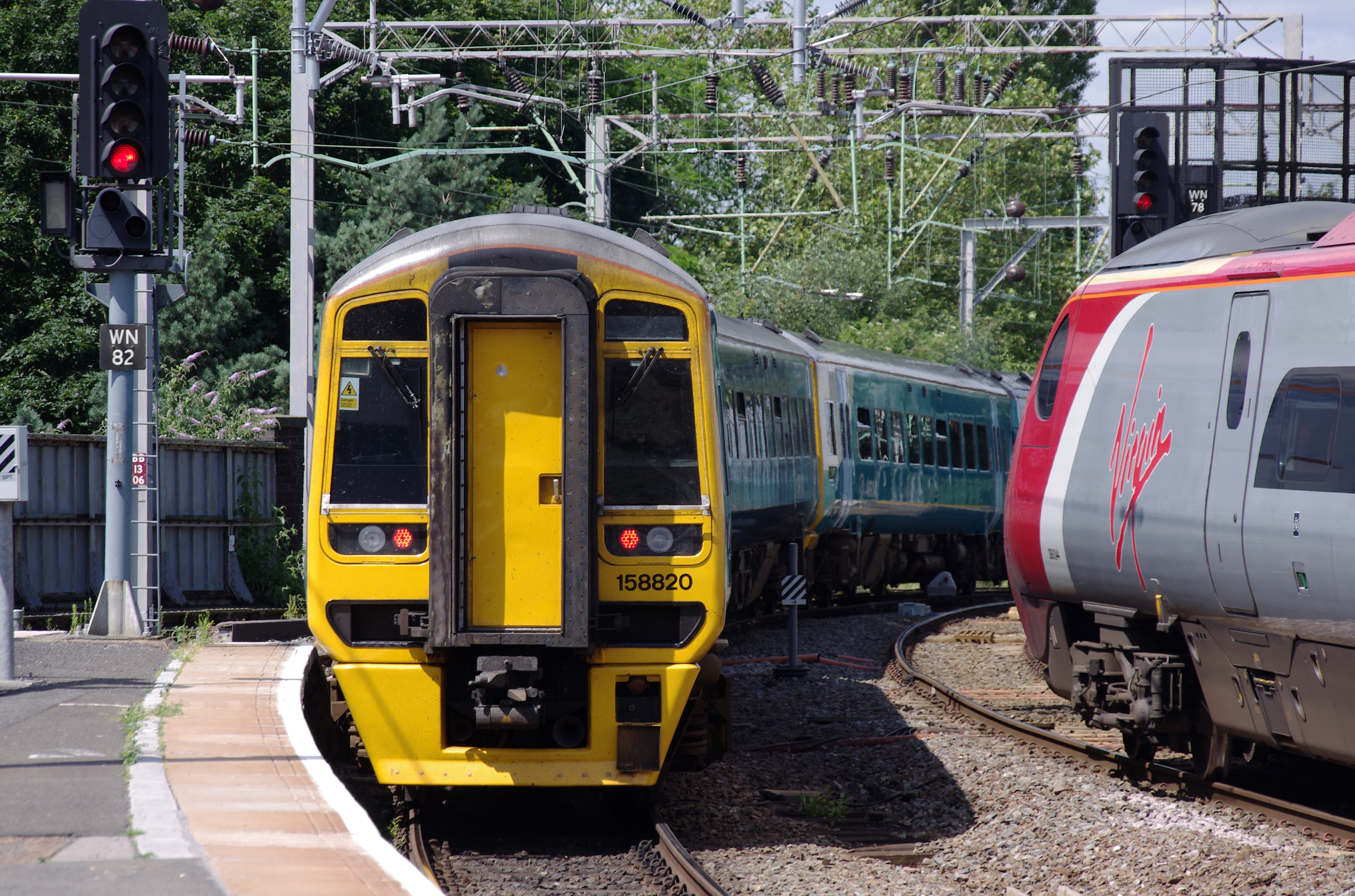
Two Transport for Wales Class 158s departing from the station

Transport for Wales

- 1 tph to Birmingham International
- 1 tp2h to Aberystwyth and Pwllheli, via Shrewsbury; the service divides at Machynlleth
- 1 tp2h to Holyhead.

West Midlands Trains:

London Northwestern Railway

- 2 tph to Birmingham New Street; of which:
  - 1 tph travels via Coseley
  - 1 tph travels via Smethwick Galton Bridge
- 2 tph to Liverpool Lime Street, via Stafford and Crewe.

West Midlands Railway:

- 2 tph to Walsall, via Birmingham New Street
- 2 tph to Birmingham New Street; of which:
  - 1 tph calls at Smethwick Galton Bridge only
  - 1 tph calls at Willenhall, Darlaston and Tame Bridge Parkway
- 2 tph to Shrewsbury, via Telford Central.

| Preceding station | National Rail | Following station |
|---|---|---|
| Stafford | CrossCountry South West – Manchester | Birmingham New Street |
| Penkridge | London Northwestern Railway; Birmingham–Liverpool | Coseley |
| Penkridge | London Northwestern Railway; Birmingham–Liverpool | Smethwick Galton Bridge |
| Telford Central | Transport for Wales; North Wales Main Line | Sandwell & Dudley |
| Telford Central | Transport for Wales; Cambrian Line | Sandwell & Dudley |
| Shifnal | West Midlands Railway Birmingham – Wolverhampton – Shrewsbury | Smethwick Galton Bridge |
| Bilbrook | West Midlands Railway Birmingham – Wolverhampton – Shrewsbury | Willenhall |
| Terminus | West Midlands Railway; Wolverhampton – Birmingham – Walsall | Coseley |
| Stafford | Avanti West Coast West Coast Main Line | Sandwell & Dudley |
| | Disused railways | |
| Terminus | Wolverhampton and Walsall Railway; Later Midland Railway | Heath Town |

=== West Midlands Metro stop ===
Wolverhampton station
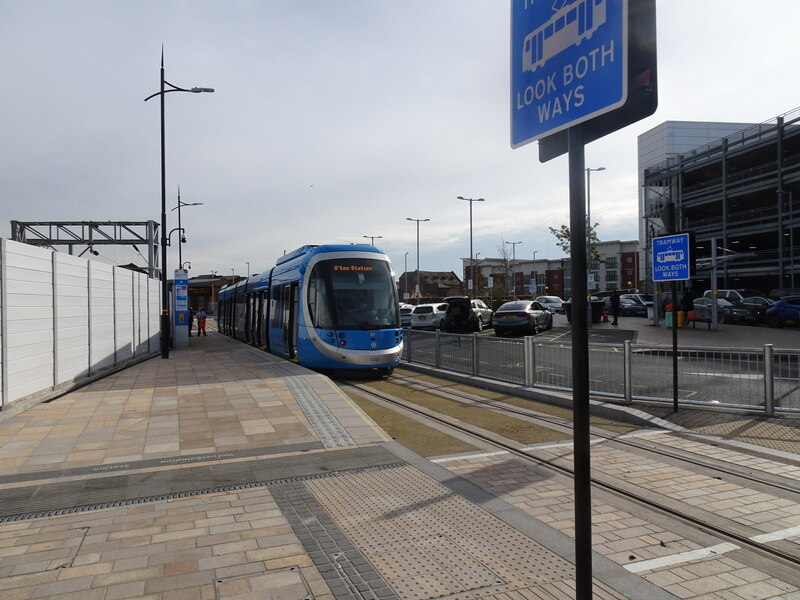

General information
- Location: Railway Drive, Wolverhampton, England,
- System: West Midlands Metro tram stop
- Line: Line 1 (Edgbaston Village/Millennium Point - Wolverhampton St George's/Wolverhampton station)
- Platforms: 1

History
- Opened: 17 September 2023

Passengers
- N/A
Location

As part of the Interchange project, West Midlands Metro Line 1 was extended to the railway station with the addition of a new Metro stop. It was expected to be operational by 2020; however, this was delayed until the stop opened on 17 September 2023.

| Preceding station | West Midlands Metro | Following station |
|---|---|---|
| Pipers Row | Line 1 | Terminus |
