= Grand Junction Railway =

Former railway company in England

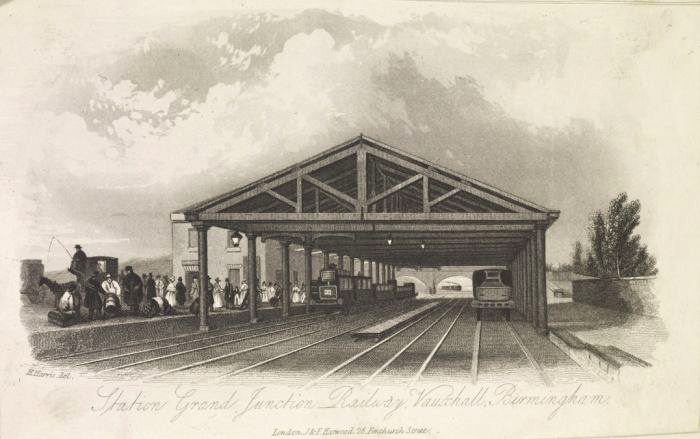
- "Station, Grand Junction Railway, Vauxhall, Birmingham". Engraving by H. Harris, 1841.

Overview
- Locale: Birmingham, Wolverhampton, Stafford, Crewe
- Dates of operation: 4 July 1837–1846
- Predecessor: Warrington and Newton Railway
- Successor: London and North Western Railway

Technical
- Track gauge: 4 ft 8 1/2 in (1,435 mm)
- Length: 82 miles (132 km)

The Grand Junction Railway (GJR) was an early railway company in the United Kingdom, which existed between 1833 and 1846. The line built by the company, which opened in 1837, linked the Liverpool and Manchester Railway to Birmingham via Warrington, Crewe, Stafford and Wolverhampton. This was the first trunk railway to be completed in England, and arguably the world's first long-distance railway with steam traction. (Note: The very first long distance railway had been the horse drawn line between České Budějovice in Bohemia, Linz, and Gmunden (Upper Austria).) It terminated at Curzon Street Station in Birmingham, which it shared with the London and Birmingham Railway (L&BR), whose adjacent platforms gave an interchange with full connectivity (with through carriages) between Liverpool, Manchester and London.

The company merged with its business partners in 1846 to form the London and North Western Railway (LNWR). The lines which comprised the GJR now form the central section of the West Coast Main Line.

== History ==
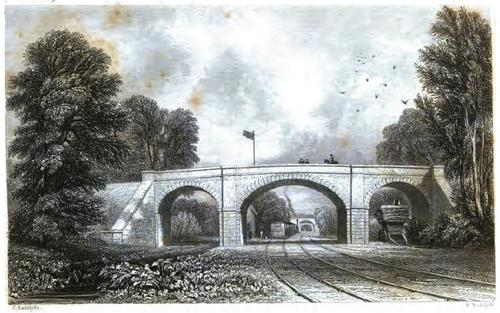
Newton Road station on the Grand Junction Railway, one of the original stations of the line, in 1839. The station was relocated twice and is now defunct.

Grand Junction Railway Act 1833
- Act of Parliament
- Parliament of the United Kingdom
- Long title: An Act for making a Railway from the Warrington and Newton Railway at Warrington in the County of Lancaster to Birmingham in the County of Warwick, to be called the Grand Junction Railway.
- Citation: 3 & 4 Will. 4. c. xxxiv

Dates
- Royal assent: 6 May 1833

Other legislation
- Repealed by: London and North Western Railway Act 1846

Status: Repealed

Text of statute as originally enacted

The Grand Junction Railway Company was established in the second half of 1832 by the consolidation of two rival companies: the Birmingham and Liverpool Railway Company and the Liverpool and Birmingham Railway Company. Authorised by an act of Parliament, the Grand Junction Railway Act 1833 (3 & 4 Will. 4. c. xxxiv), on 6 May 1833 and designed by George Stephenson and Joseph Locke, the Grand Junction Railway opened for business on 4 July 1837, running for 82 miles (132 km) from Birmingham through Wolverhampton (via Perry Barr and Bescot), Stafford, Crewe, and Warrington, then via the existing Warrington and Newton Railway to join the Liverpool and Manchester Railway at a triangular junction at Newton Junction. The GJR established its chief engineering works at Crewe, relocating there from Edge Hill, in Liverpool.

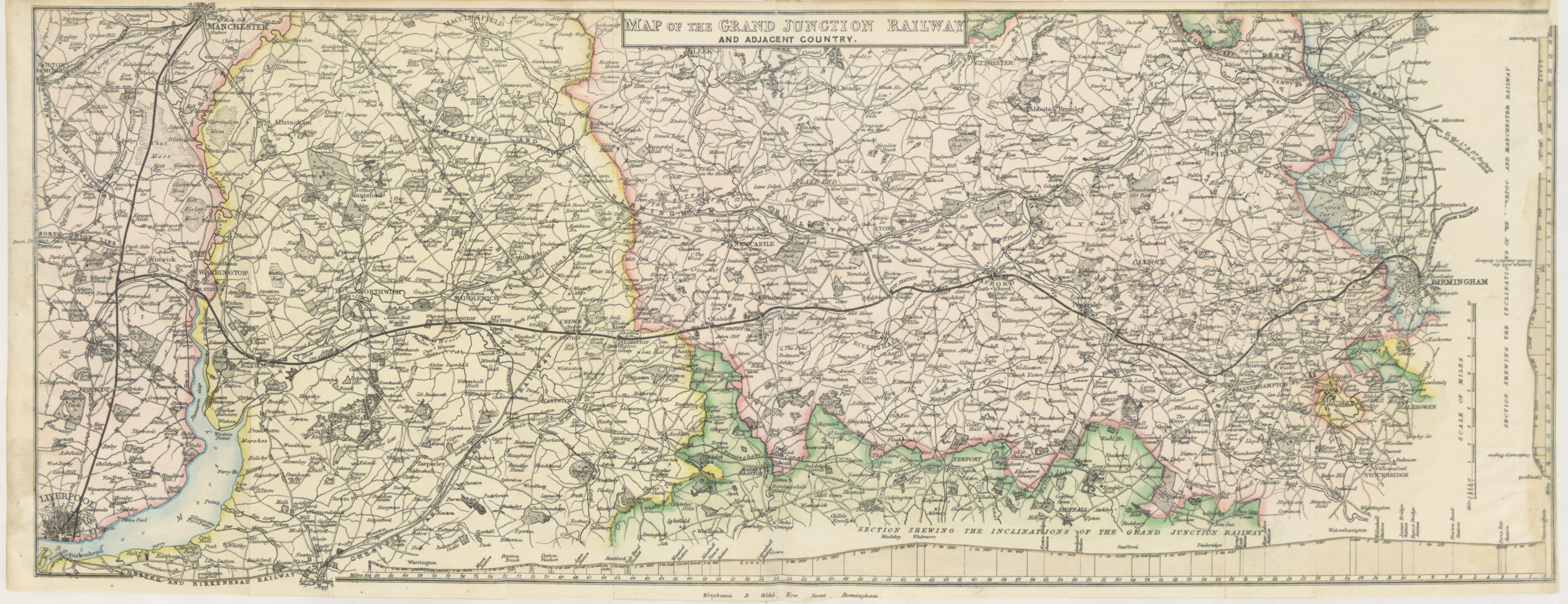
1839 map of the GJR and adjoining railways.

It began operation with a temporary Birmingham terminus at Vauxhall. The travelling post office where mail was sorted on a moving train was instituted on the Grand Junction Railway in January 1838. Using a converted horse-box, it was carried out at the suggestion of Frederick Karstadt, a General Post Office surveyor. Karstadt's son was one of two mail clerks who did the sorting.

When the London and Birmingham Railway opened on 17 September 1838, services were routed to and from Curzon Street station which it shared with the Grand Junction Railway, the platforms of which were adjacent, providing a link between Liverpool, Manchester and London. The route between Curzon Street railway station and Vauxhall primarily consisted of the Birmingham Viaduct. It consisted of 28 arches, each 31 feet (9.4 m) wide and 28 feet (8.5 m) tall and crossed the River Rea. In October 1838, the Liverpool Mercury reported that

It is confidently expected, that after the ensuing winter is over, and the embankments on the London and Birmingham Line are well settled down, first class trains between Liverpool and Manchester and London will not occupy more than nine hours in the journey. This being accomplished, what further improvement could be desired between London and Lancashire?

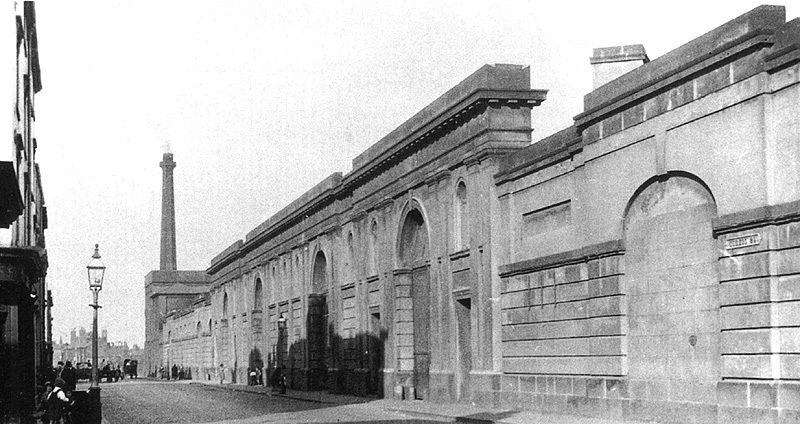
Joseph Franklin's Curzon Street Station for GJR

In 1840, the GJR absorbed the Chester and Crewe Railway soon before it began operation. Considering itself as part of a grand railway network, the company encouraged the development of the North Union Railway which extended the tracks to Preston, and it also invested in the Lancaster and Carlisle Railway and the Caledonian Railway. In 1845, the GJR merged with the Liverpool and Manchester Railway, and consolidated its position by buying the North Union Railway in association with the Manchester and Leeds Railway.

In 1841, the company appointed Captain Mark Huish as the secretary of the railway. Huish was ruthless in the development of the business and contributed significantly to the company's success.

== Profits ==
The GJR was very profitable, paying dividends of at least 10% from its beginning and having a final capital value of more than £5.75 million (equivalent to £579.55 million now) when it merged with the London and Birmingham Railway and Manchester and Birmingham Railway companies to become the London and North Western Railway in 1846, which in turn formed part of the London Midland and Scottish Railway in 1923.

== Locomotives ==
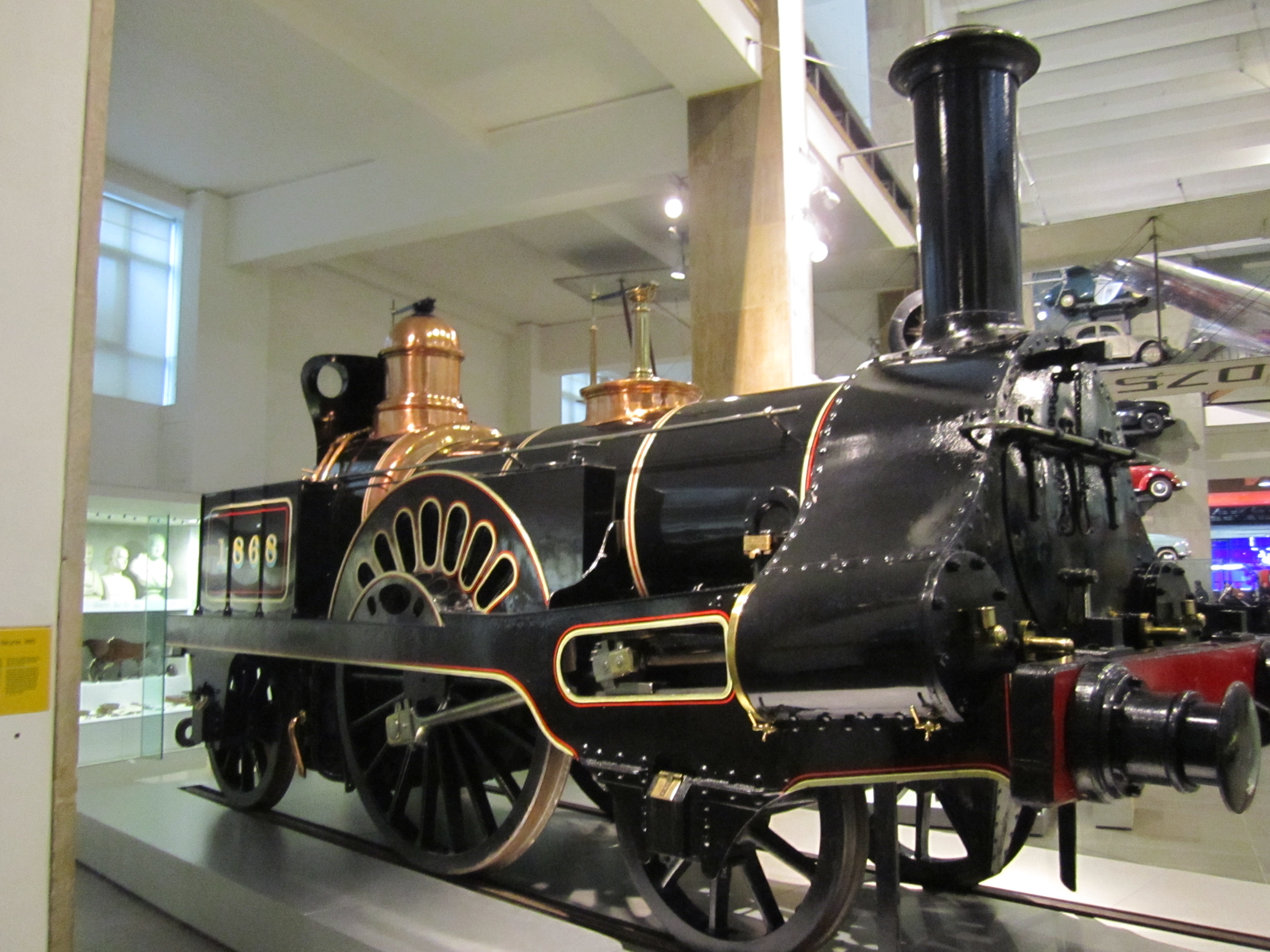
Columbine in LNWR livery

One locomotive, Columbine, a 2-2-2 tender engine built in 1845 at Crewe Works, is preserved at the National Railway Museum. Designed by Alexander Allan, it was the first of the GJR's standard 'Crewe-type' engines, with outside cylinders, and carried fleet number 49. It was withdrawn from service in 1902 by the LNWR, carrying their number 1868.
