= Hamstead railway station =

Railway station in Birmingham, England

Hamstead
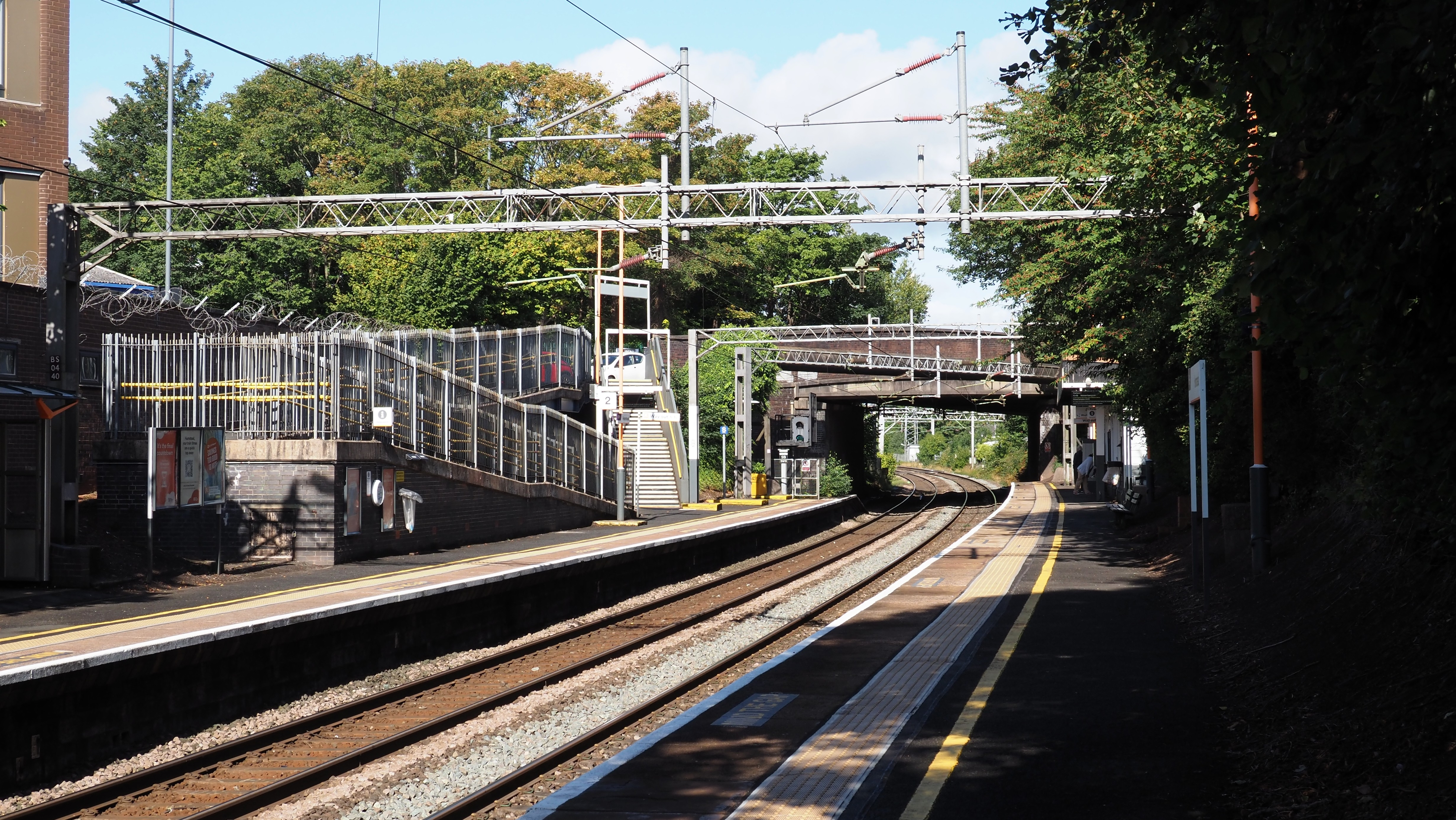
- Hamstead Station pictured in 2025

General information
- Location: Hamstead, Birmingham; England
- Coordinates: 52.530°N 1.928°W
- Grid reference: SP049925
- Manager: West Midlands Trains
- Transit authority: Transport for West Midlands
- Platforms: 2

Other information
- Station code: HSD
- Fare zone: 3
- Classification: DfT category E

History
- Original company: Grand Junction Railway
- Pre-grouping: London and North Western Railway
- Post-grouping: London, Midland and Scottish Railway

Key dates
- 4 July 1837: Opened as Hamstead and Great Barr
- 1 May 1875: Renamed Great Barr
- 25 March 1899: Resited
- 6 May 1974: Renamed Hamstead

Passengers
- 2021/22: ▲0.150 million
- 2022/23: ▲0.178 million
- 2023/24: ▲0.214 million
- 2024/25: ▲0.231 million
- 2025/26: ▲0.276 million
Location
Notes
- Passenger statistics from the Office of Rail and Road

Hamstead railway station serves the Hamstead, Great Barr and Handsworth Wood areas of Birmingham, England. It is located at the junction of Rocky Lane and Old Walsall Road, Hamstead, at Birmingham's border with the borough of Sandwell. It is situated on the Chase Line, part of the former Grand Junction Railway, opened in 1837. The station, and all trains serving it, are operated by West Midlands Trains.

A bridge carrying Old Walsall Road over the railway serves as the only means for passengers to cross from one platform to the other.

== History ==
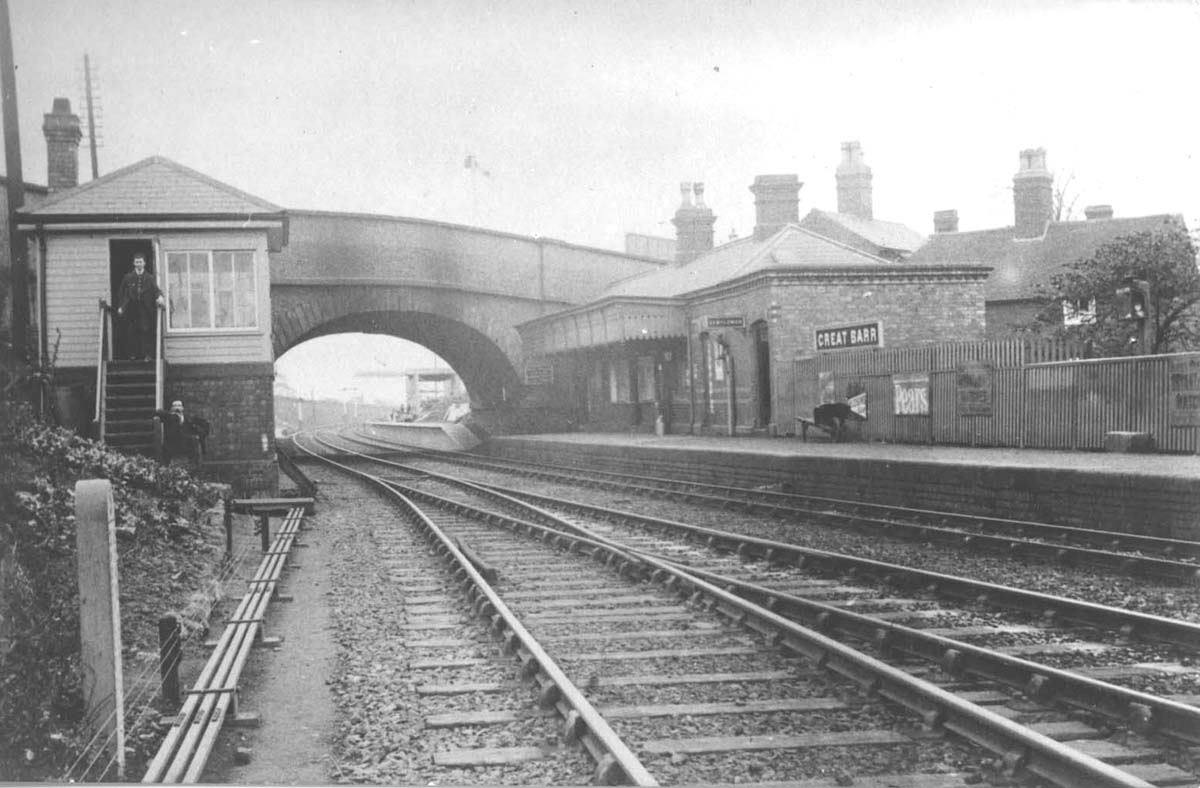
The signal box and old station building, just before the latter's 1899 closure, with the new down platform seen under the original arched road bridge (replaced in the mid-1960s, when the line was electrified).

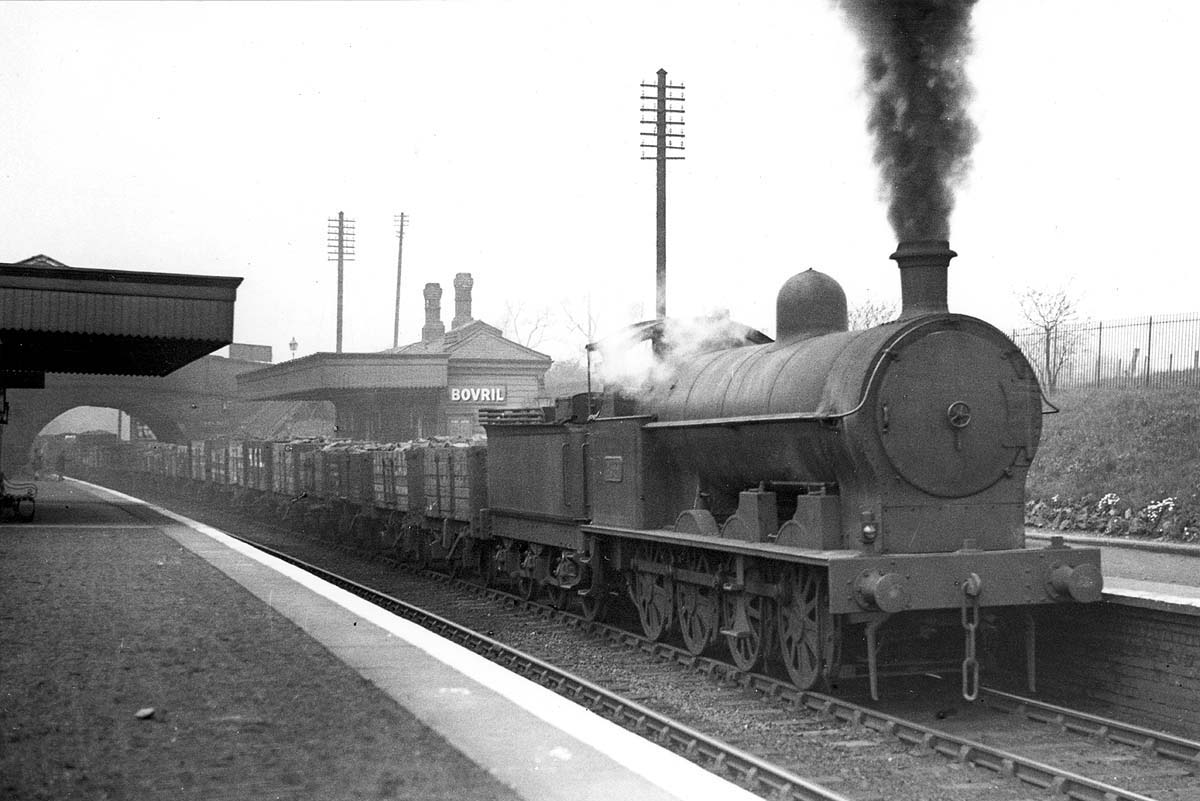
An unidentified ex-LNWR 0-8-0 'G1' passes through Great Barr station, towards Perry Barr, with a coal train, circa 1923.

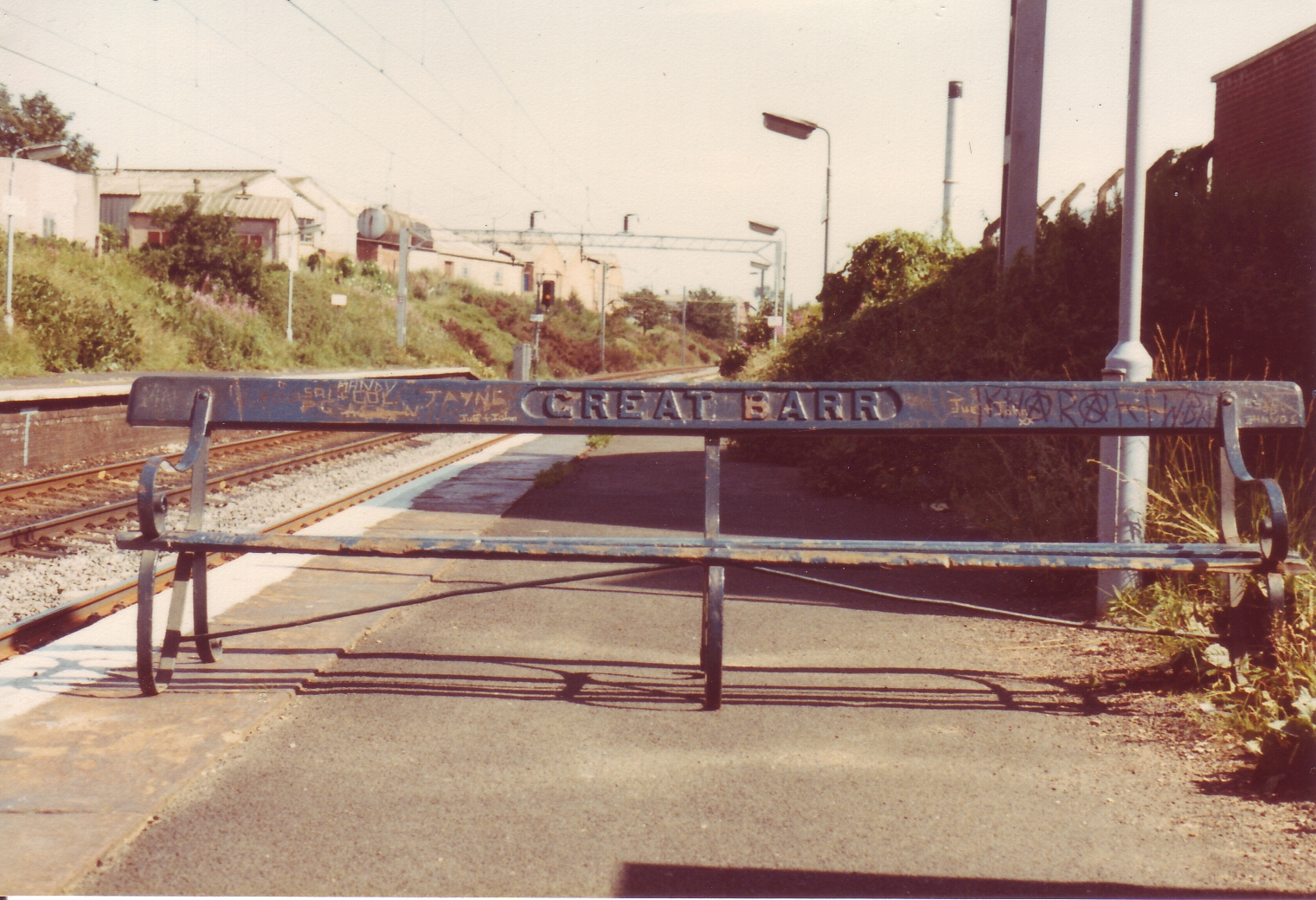
"Great Barr" station bench, photographed at Hamstead in late 1970s/early 1980s

The station was opened by the Grand Junction Railway (GJR) on 4 July 1837, and was named Hamstead and Great Barr; it was renamed Great Barr by the London and North Western Railway (LNWR, the successor to the GJR) on 1 May 1875. The same year an LNWR Type 3, 'size C' signalbox was erected at the station. The platforms were originally on opposite sides of the road bridge, with the down (Walsall-bound) platform to the west, but that platform was resited opposite the up platform on 25 March 1899. Sidings, controlled by the signalbox, served the adjacent Hamstead Colliery, west of the station and north of the line.

The line through the station was electrified in 1966 as part of the London Midland Region's electrification programme. The actual energization of the line from Coventry to Walsall through Aston took place on 15 August 1966. The road bridge was replaced and the signalbox removed as part of the works (the nameplate from the signalbox is now in Chasewater Railway Museum). The station was renamed Hamstead on 6 May 1974.

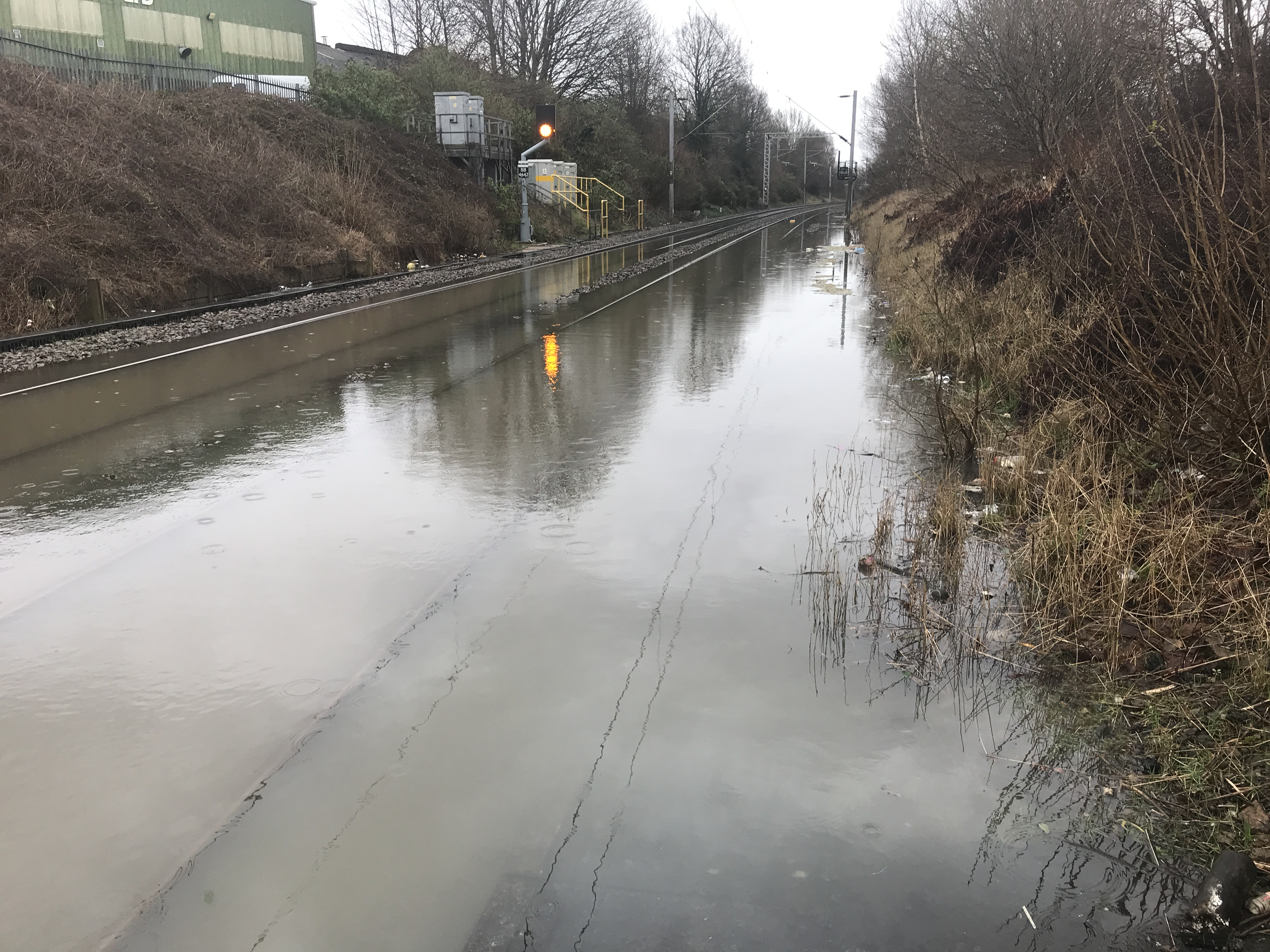
The flooded station, looking towards Birmingham, on 16 February 2020

Occasionally, such as during Storm Dennis in February 2020, the nearby River Tame overflows and floods the station.

== Facilities ==
The wooden ticket office is located on the Birmingham New Street-bound platform and is staffed part-time seven days per week. A self-service ticket machine is situated outside this structure for use when the office is closed and for collecting pre-paid tickets. A modern waiting shelter is located on the opposite side, with customer help points, CIS screens and automated announcements on both sides used to offer train running information. Both platforms have step-free access from the street.

== Services ==
The typical Monday-Saturday daytime service sees two trains per hour in each direction between Walsall and Birmingham New Street (and through towards Wolverhampton). Services are reduced to one train per in the evenings and on Sundays.

All trains serving the station are operated by West Midlands Trains.

In the case of engineering work on the line (which often occurs on Sundays), Hamstead is usually the last stop for trains to Birmingham from Walsall or the Chase Line. Such services deviate from normal running at Perry Barr North Junction and enter New Street through Soho, merging with the Birmingham to Wolverhampton line just south of Smethwick Rolfe Street. A replacement bus service operates on these days to Hamstead from New Street, calling Duddeston, Aston and Witton beforehand.

== Nearby ==
Hamstead also serves:

- Perry Hall Park (west end)
- Sandwell Valley
  - RSPB Sandwell Valley

Preceding station	National Rail	Following station
Tame Bridge Parkway	West Midlands Railway Chase Line	Perry Barr
Historical railways
Newton Road Line open, station closed	London and North Western Railway Chase Line	Perry Barr Line and station open
