= Vauxhall station (disambiguation) =

Vauxhall station is a mainline and underground station in London.

Vauxhall station may also refer to:

- Duddeston railway station in Birmingham, England, previously known as "Vauxhall" and "Vauxhall and Duddeston"
- Great Yarmouth railway station in England, formerly known as "Great Yarmouth Vauxhall"
