= Bloomsbury and Nechells railway station =

Disused railway station in Nechells, Birmingham

Bloomsbury and Nechells

General information
- Location: Nechells, Birmingham; England
- Coordinates: 52.4922°N 1.8698°W
- Platforms: 2

Other information
- Status: Disused

History
- Original company: London and North Western Railway
- Pre-grouping: London and North Western Railway

Key dates
- 1 August 1856: Opened
- 1 March 1869: Closed
Location

Bloomsbury and Nechells railway station served the district of Nechells, Birmingham, England, from 1856 to 1869 by the London and North Western Railway on their Grand Junction line.

== History ==
The station was opened on 1 August 1856 by the London and North Western Railway. It was also known as Bloomsbury and Nechels in Bradshaw and Bloomsbury in the LNWR timetable. It closed on 1 March 1869 when Duddeston was rebuilt.

Preceding station	Disused railways	Following station
Duddeston; Line and station open	London and North Western Railway	Aston; Line and station open
