= Vauxhall Gardens (Birmingham) =

Former pleasure gardens in Birmingham, England

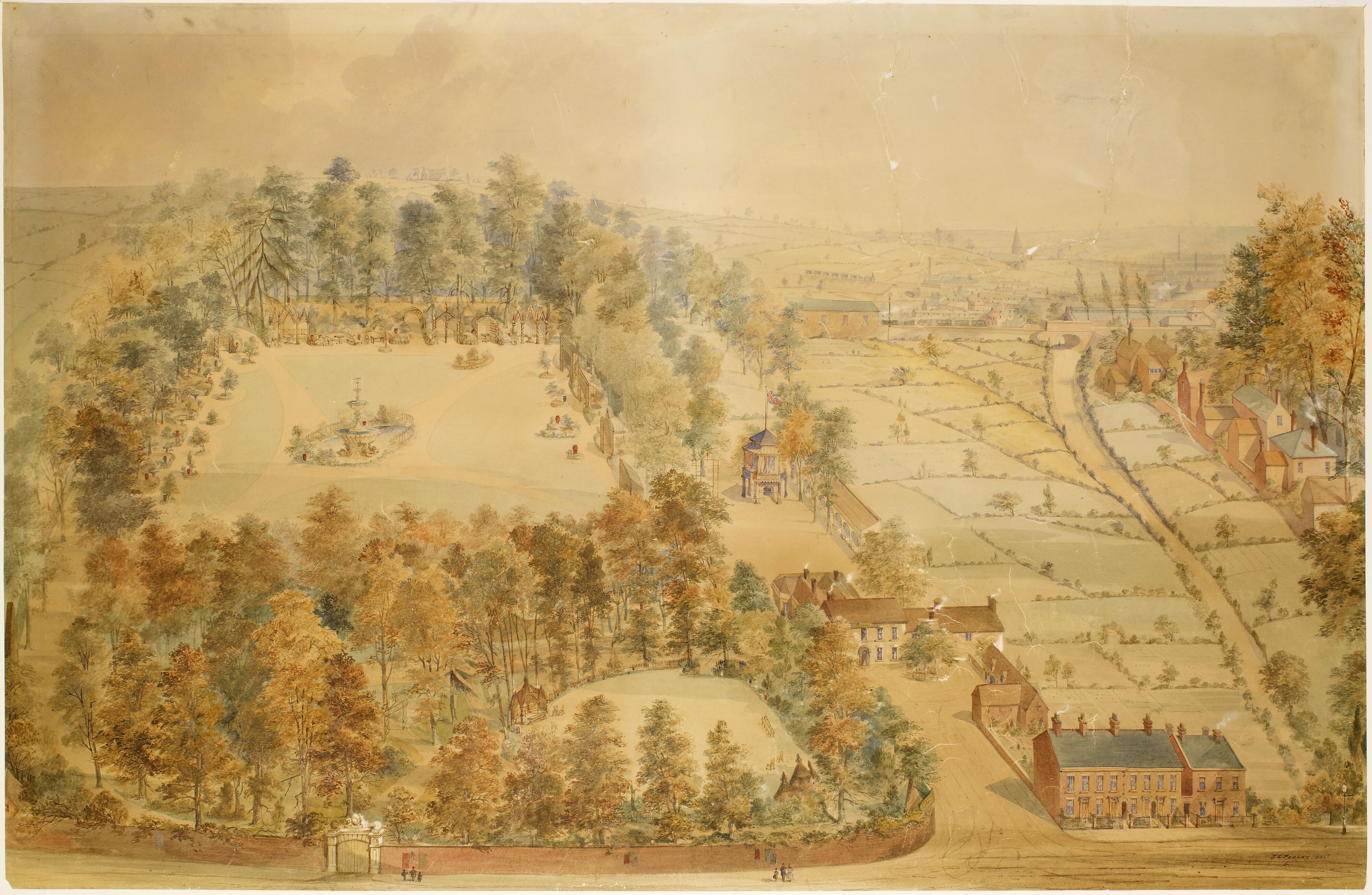
- Vauxhall Gardens, Saltley (1850) by J.L. Pedley
- Interactive map of Vauxhall Gardens
- Type: Pleasure garden
- Location: Duddeston
- Nearest city: Birmingham
- Coordinates: 52.486454°N 1.874716°W
- Created: 4 June 1758
- Status: First closure 16 September 1850

Vauxhall Gardens, later Royal Vauxhall Gardens, was a pleasure garden in the Duddeston area of Aston (now Birmingham (Note: Aston, including Duddeston, became part of Birmingham in 1911)), England. It operated from 1758 to 1850. Nothing remains of the gardens today.

== History ==
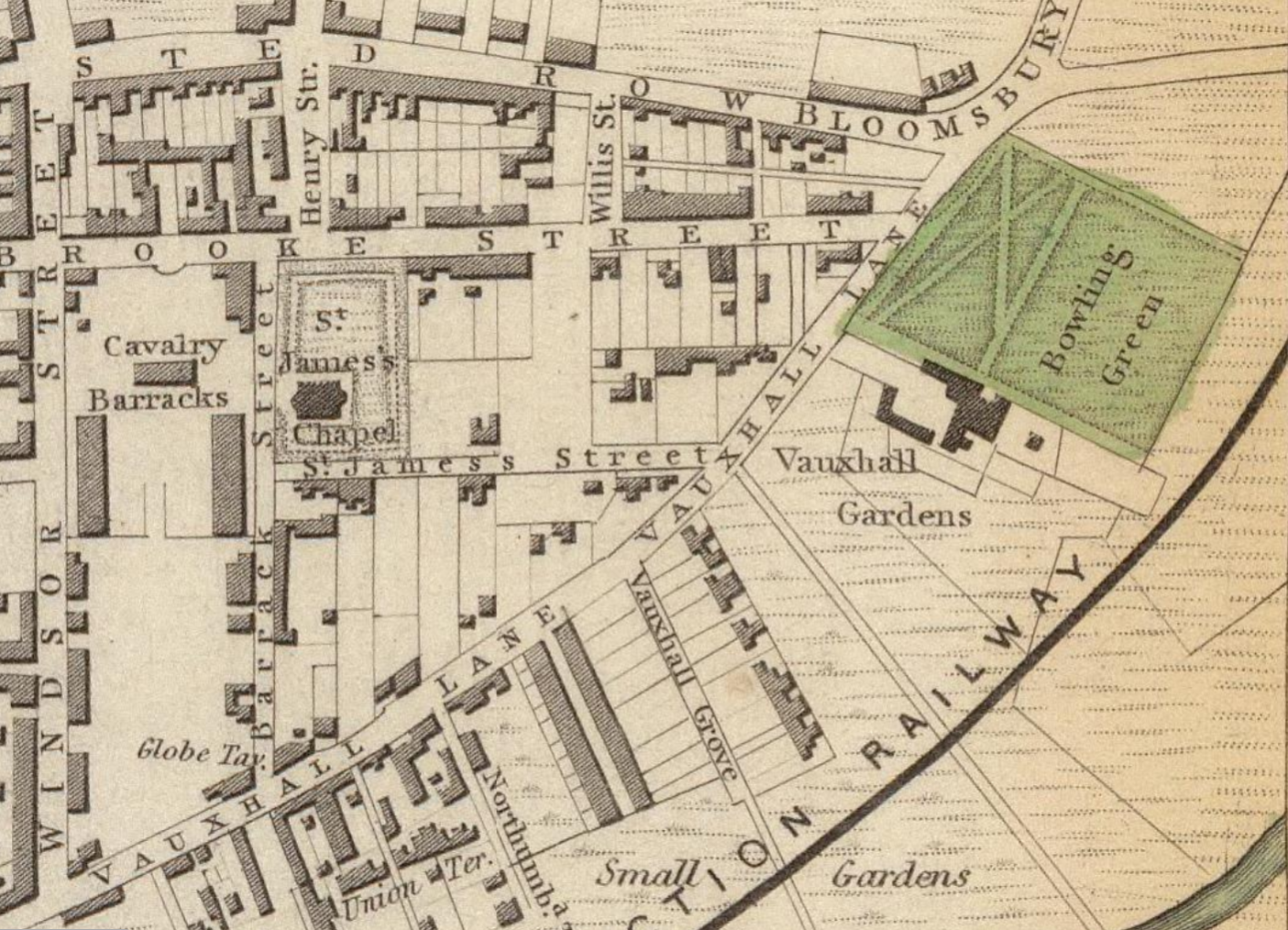
The gardens on J. Henshall's map of Birmingham (1839), shown west of the Grand Junction line into Curzon Street station

The gardens, named after London's Vauxhall Gardens, originated as the grounds of Duddeston Hall, (Note: Duddeston Hall was also known as "Dudston Hall", and at some point as "Vaux-Hall". It was the seat of the Holte family until they moved to nearby Aston Hall.) which opened as a public house on 4 June 1758, leased from Sir Lister Holte. At that time, the area was rural, but close to the growing industrial town of Birmingham. (Note: Birmingham became a city in 1889) The hall was demolished in 1781.

The gardens included statues, a bowling green, and venue for orchestral concerts, with an organ. Other events held there included fairs, firework displays, balloon ascents and cock-fights.

From 1768 or earlier the concerts were organised by Jeremiah Clark, who also played violin there.

The Grand Junction Railway's original terminus, the first station serving Birmingham, opened nearby in 1837 under the name "Vauxhall station",. (Note: now Duddeston railway station) This facilitated day-visits by people in outlying towns such as Wolverhampton, Walsall and by the 1840s Lichfield, Burton-upon-Trent, and Dudley.

Some time in the early or mid 1800s, more respectable people stopped attending the gardens and the entertainments changed to include athletic events for monetary prizes.

In 1846, the proprietor was a Mr. Stewart, and the site known as "Royal Vauxhall Gardens"

The gardens were closed with a farewell dinner and ball on 16 September 1850. The ball ended at 6am the following morning, at which time the first tree was symbolically felled. The site was acquired by the Victoria Land Society, a mutual building society. (Note: The Victorian housing built on the site is now also gone, replaced by a circa 1970s housing estate.)

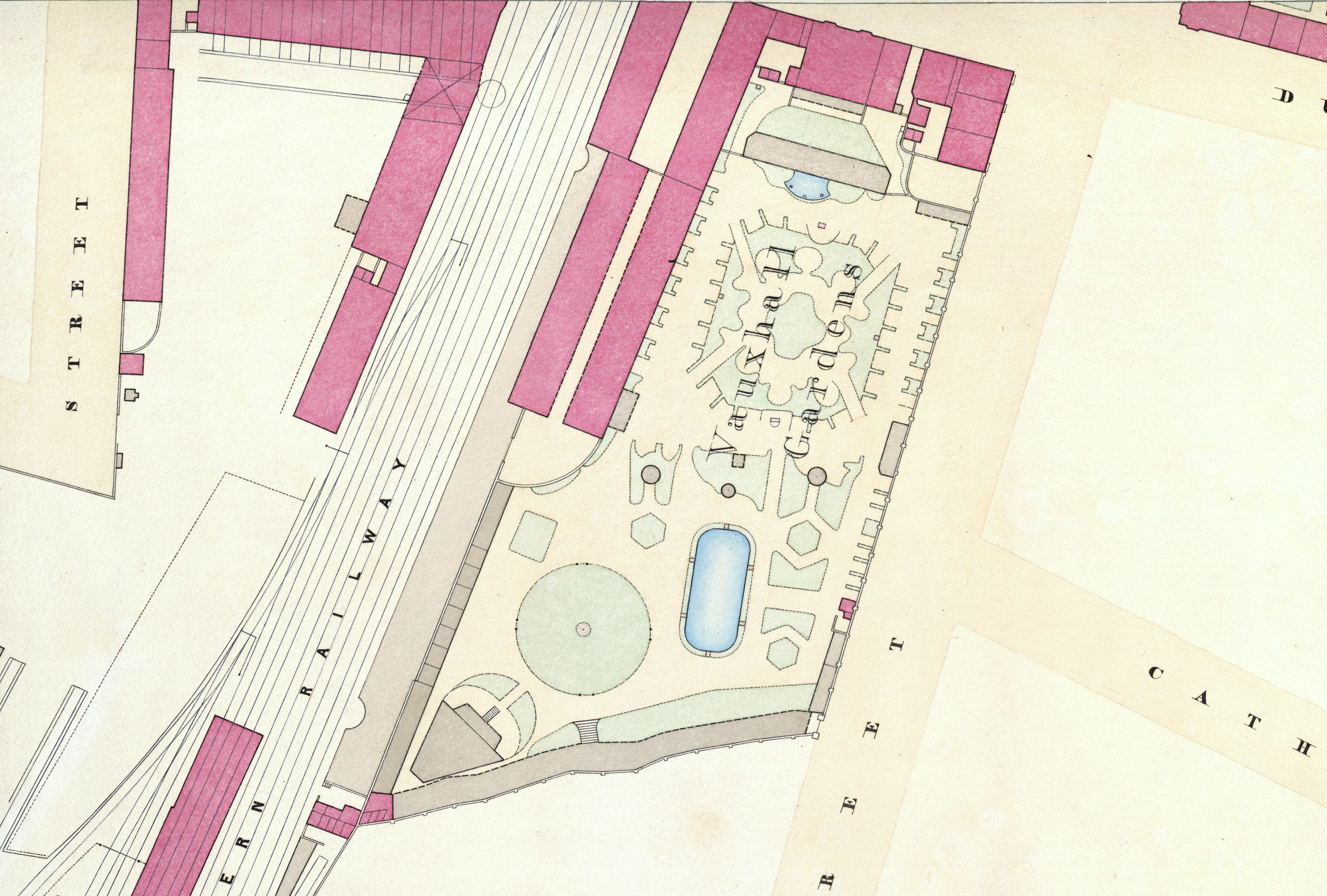
The second gardens, fronting what became Duddeston Mill Road (at 52.48811°N 1.87087°W), mapped in the "New Survey of the Borough of Birmingham" (surveyed from 1851, published 1855, sheet 82), east of the adjacent railway station. As of 2025, this site is occupied by a factory.

Despite this, nearby gardens under the same name were operating again in subsequent years, with events advertised, for example, in Aris's Birmingham Gazette in July 1853, under a new proprietor, John Henry Bradshaw. A map published in 1855 (pictured) shows these east of the railway line, whereas the original gardens were to its west, and further south.

Aston Lower Grounds, another pleasure garden, also now defunct, were opened to the public by Queen Victoria on 16 June 1858. They were about 1.5 miles further to the north-west.

== In popular culture ==
Just prior to the 1850 closure the gardens were painted in a bird's-eye view by J.L. Pedley.

The gardens are the subject of the poem Impromptu, by Ned Farmer, lamenting their impending closure, which was written there on 6 March 1850.
