= Duddeston Barracks =

Military installation in Birmingham, England

- Duddeston
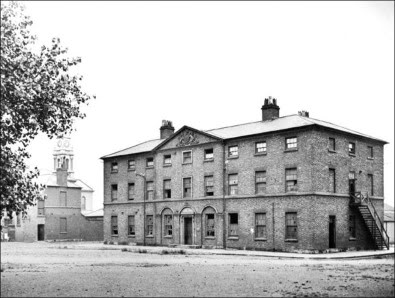
- Duddeston Barracks

Site information
- Type: Barracks
- Owner: War Office
- Operator: British Army

Location
- Location within West Midlands
- Coordinates: 52.485°N 1.879°W

Site history
- Built: 1793
- Built for: War Office
- In use: 1793–1932

Duddeston Barracks was a military installation in Great Brook Street, Duddeston, Birmingham, England.

== History ==
The barracks were commissioned as part of the response to the Priestley Riots; they were designed by John Rawsthorne and completed in 1793. Although intended for cavalry regiments, they were used by the Royal Horse Artillery from 1878 and became the home of 1st South Midland Field Ambulance during the First World War. The barracks were demolished in 1932 and the site is now occupied by the maisonettes of the Ashcroft Estate.
