= Perry Hall Park =

Park in Birmingham, England

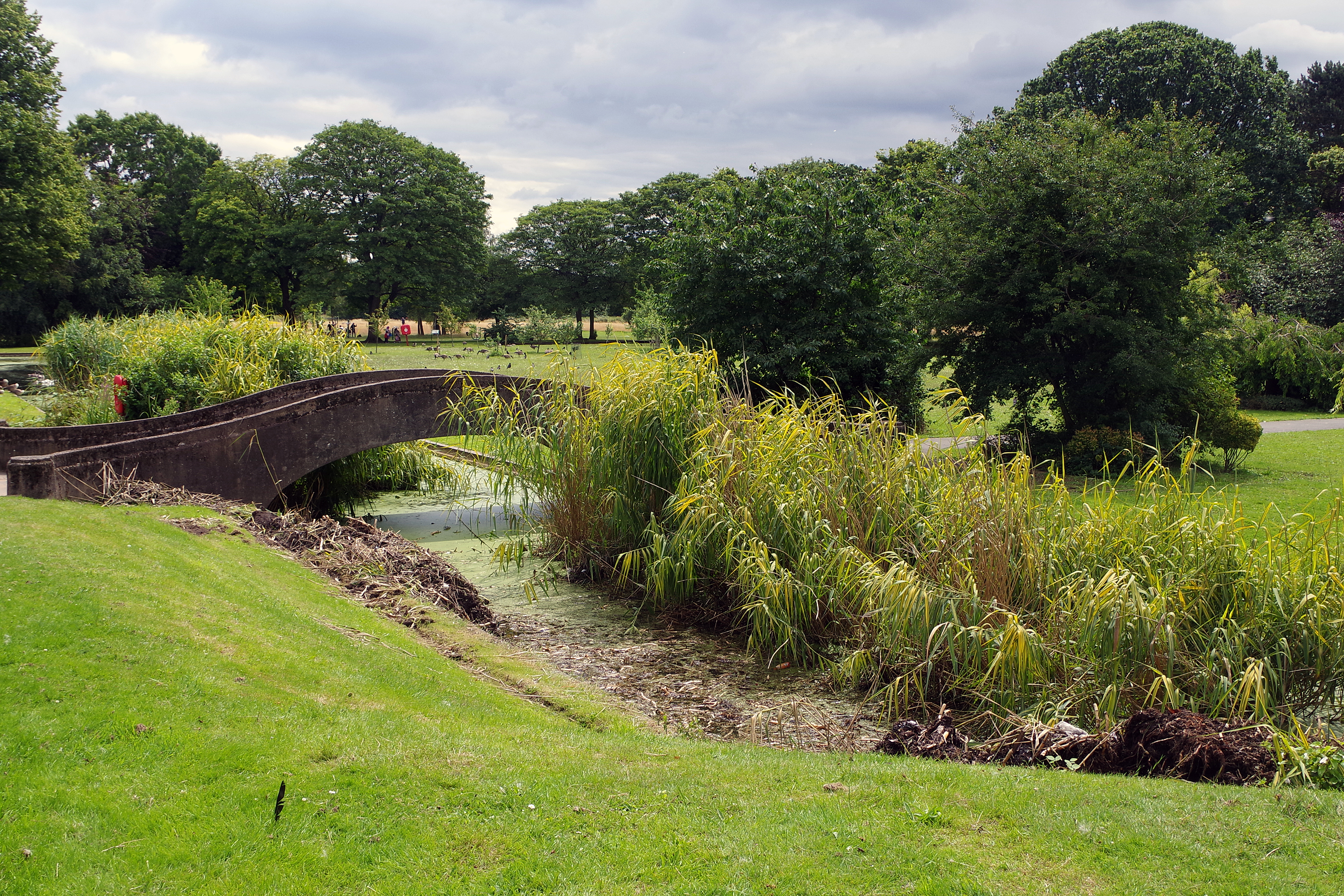
- Interactive map of Perry Hall Park
- Location: Birmingham, England
- Coordinates: 52.52405°N 1.91447°W
- Operator: Birmingham City Council
- Public transit: Perry Barr railway station and Hamstead railway station

Perry Hall Park or Perry Hall Country Park, and previously Perry Hall Playing Fields, is a park in Perry Barr, Birmingham, England, at grid reference SP059918. It was in Staffordshire until 1928. The site is protected by Fields in Trust through a legal "Deed of Dedication" safeguarding the future of the space as public recreation land for future generations to enjoy.

== Perry Hall ==
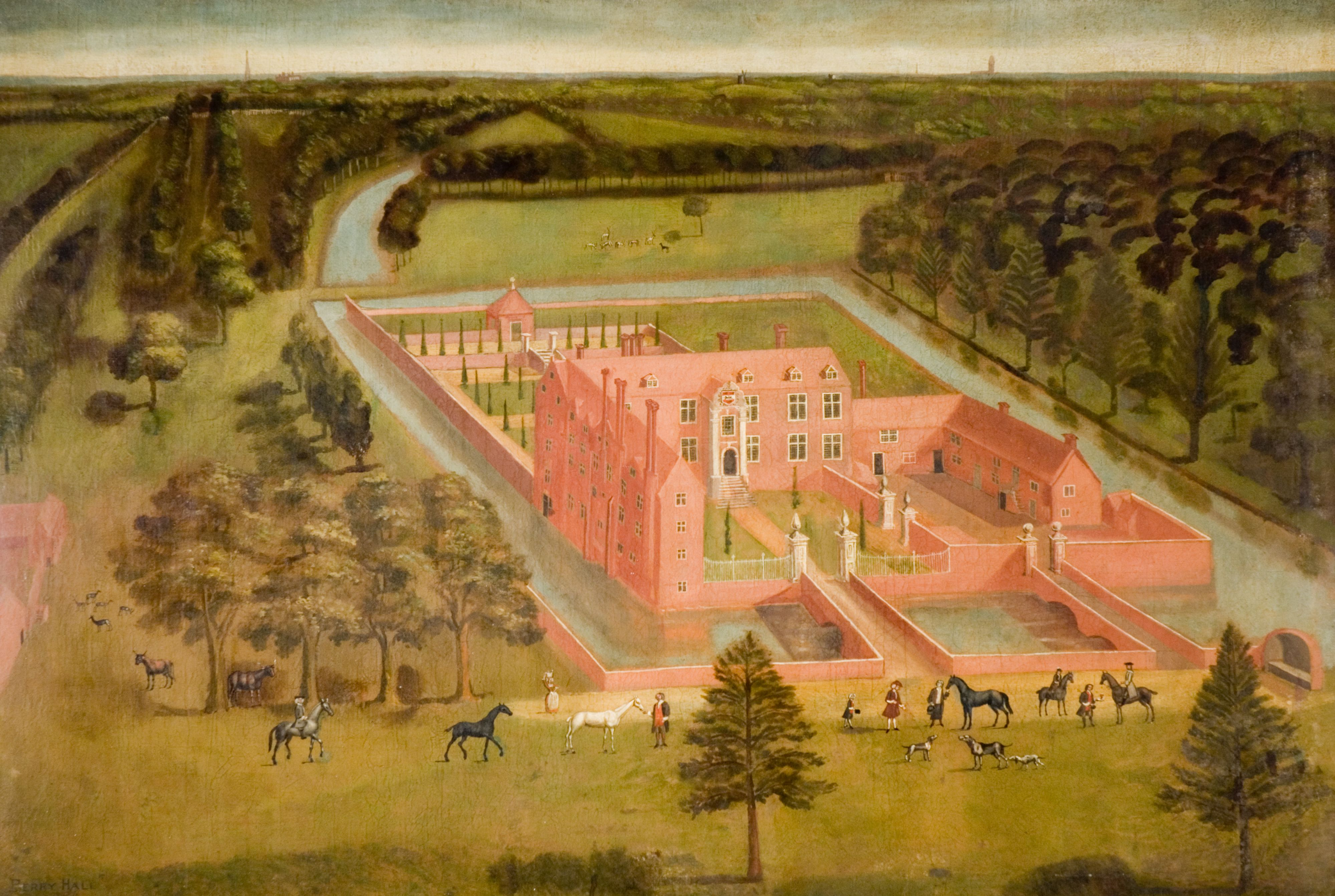
View of Perry Hall, near Birmingham (between 1720 & 1730) by Thomas Bardwell

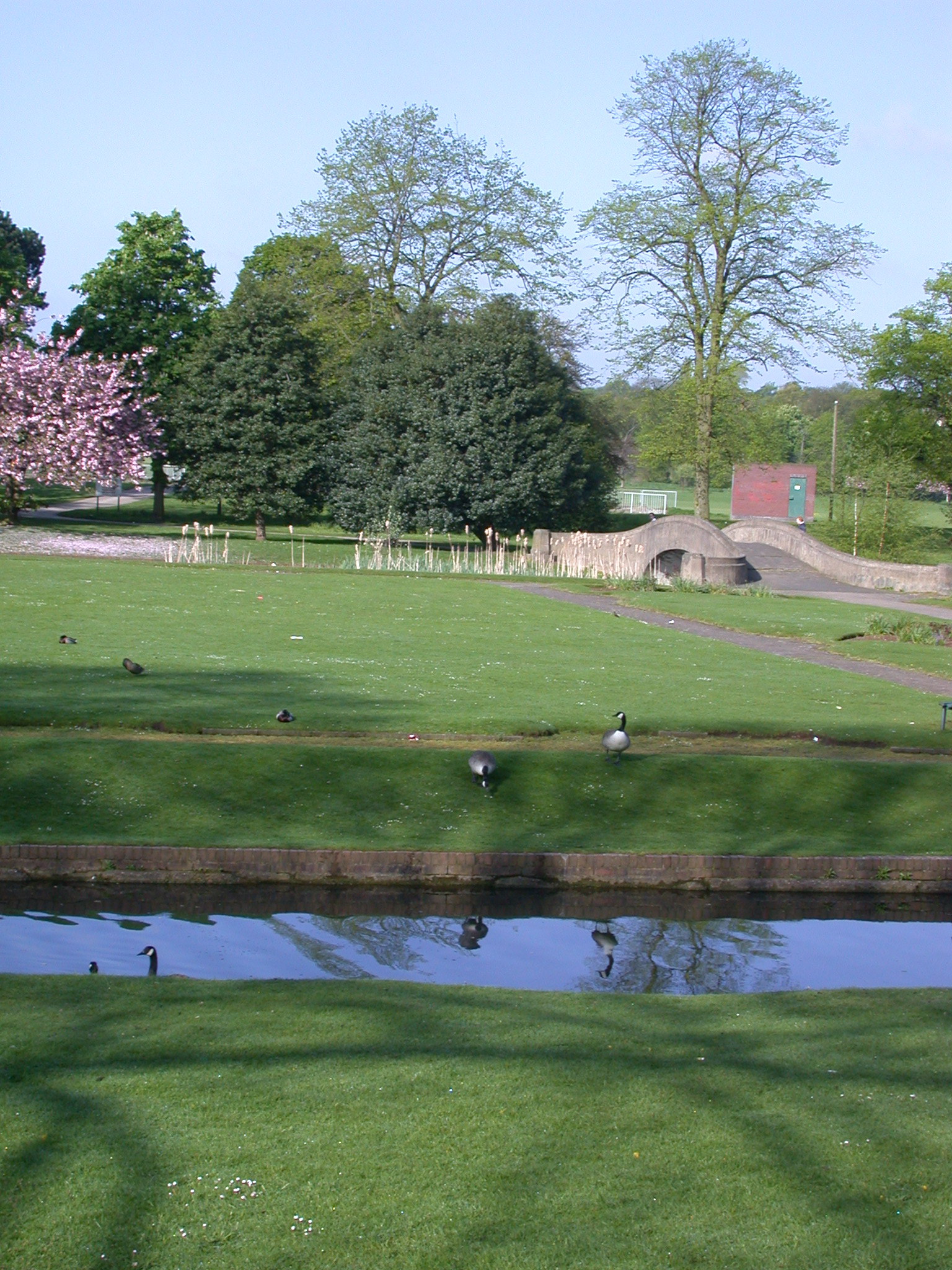
Part of the moat (also crossed by the bridge in the middle distance), seen in May 2005

The park was formerly the site of Perry Hall, demolished 1927, home of the Gough family, though only the hall's moat remains after the Birmingham Corporation had to choose between saving Perry Hall and the nearby Aston Hall for financial purposes. When Harry Dorsey Gough set up home in Maryland, United States, in 1774, he named his estate there Perry Hall.

== Hydrology ==
The park is bisected by the River Tame, flowing generally north-west to south-east.

In the 1980s, work was completed to lower the parkland south-west of the river, and to create flood alleviation measures. At times of flood, excess water from the river flows over a bund and onto the sports pitches, where it is held until it can be safely and slowly released. By Summer (northern hemisphere) 2014, this had occurred on four occasions. The area is designated as a reservoir, Perry Hall Playing Fields Flood Detention Reservoir, (Note: Not to be confused with Perry Reservoir, on the Tame Valley Canal, in nearby Perry Park, nor with Perry Barr Reservoir.) which has a capacity of 184,000 cubic metres (40,000,000 imp gal).

The river was remodelled in 2005 to slow the flow, alleviate flooding and create improved habitats for wildlife, as part of the SMURF (Sustainable Management of Urban Rivers and Floodplains) project.

== Imperial Scout Rally ==
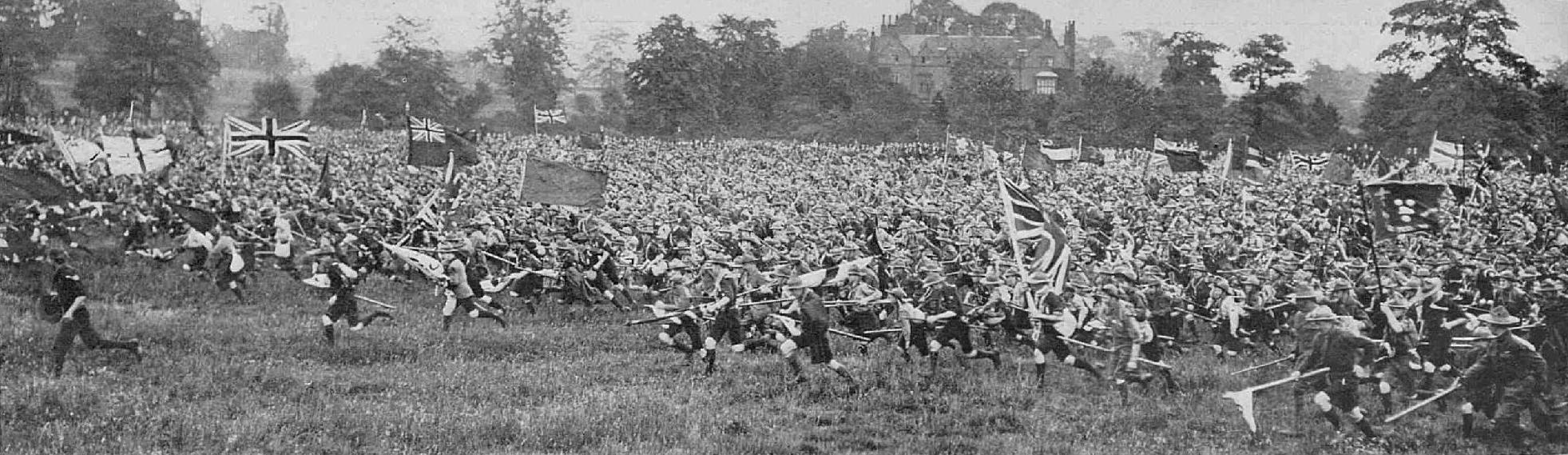
Scouts at the 1913 rally

From 2–8 July 1913, the Imperial Scout Exhibition, Rally and Sea Scout Display, the first International Scout Rally in Birmingham, was held in and around the city. The park hosted the rally, attended by about 30,000 Scouts.

== Features ==
The park is skirted by the Birmingham-Walsall railway line (the "Chase Line"), formerly part of the Grand Junction Railway which opened on 4 July 1837. It is served by nearby Perry Barr railway station and, at the western end, Hamstead railway station.

The park contains football pitches and 15 cricket pitches and is used by the Birmingham Parks Cricket League.

A 5 kilometre parkrun is held every Saturday morning at 9.00 am.

There is also a cycle speedway track in the park which is home to the Birmingham Monarchs team.

The park has a small heronry.
