= Duddeston =

Inner-city area of the Nechells ward of Birmingham, England

Coordinates: 52.4891°N 1.8826°W

Duddeston is an inner-city area of the Nechells ward of central Birmingham, England. It was part of the Birmingham Duddeston constituency until that ceased to exist in 1950.

== Etymology ==
The name Duddeston comes from Dud's Town, with Dud being the Saxon proprietor, Lord of Dudley who probably had a seat in Duddeston.

== History ==
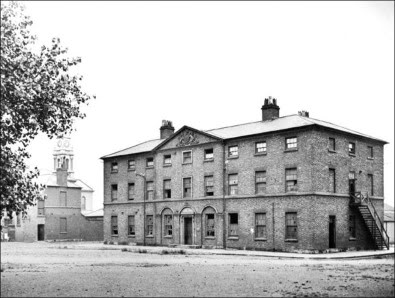
Duddeston Barracks circa 1900

Duddeston is first mentioned in a charter granted to Wulfget the Thane by Eadgar, King of the Angles in 963. There is no mention of Duddeston for another 200 years until it said that the Holte family were the residents of Duddeston Manor, a large house located next to the River Rea. This had been purchased by the family in 1365 by the family who also owned the manor of Nechells and were related to a prominent family in Erdington. Their wealth of land expanded two years later when the manor of Aston was bestowed upon them.

One hundred years later, Thomas Holte became the Chief Justice of Wales and a close friend of King Henry VIII. In 1546, Thomas died and Duddeston Hall was a sign of his wealth. His grandson, also called Thomas Holte, supplied a small army in defending Ireland and for this he was knighted. He commissioned the construction of Aston Hall soon after.

During the 18th century, many adverts for cock fighting at the hall appeared and in many, the name Vauxhall appeared. The first use of the name Vauxhall was in 1751 and was spelt Vaux Hall. It was referred to as another name for the hall. It is also known that the building had been refurbished, possibly rebuilt, to accommodate travellers. Vauxhall Gardens had also been created in the grounds, and became an attraction for the people of Birmingham. Travelling there was made easier with the opening of Vauxhall railway station (now known as Duddeston). However, the owners ran into financial difficulty and the last celebrations in the gardens were held in September 1850, before the gardens were removed. Houses were built on site.

During the Priestly Riots of 1791, the military established Duddeston Barracks in the area. The barracks remained until 1932, when they were demolished by the Birmingham Corporation for the construction of maisonettes.

After sustaining heavy damage during World War II bombing raids, as a result of its close proximity to targets such as factories and gas works, the area was named as one of five regeneration areas of the city with 267 acres (1.08 km^{2}) of land in Duddeston and the adjoining Nechells prepared for redevelopment under the Housing Act of 1936. After World War II, the city council compulsorily purchased 267 acres (108 ha) of land. This was the first redevelopment area proposed by Herbert Manzoni and was approved in 1950. The area was cleared and rebuilt in the 1950s and 1960s, erasing the nineteenth century structures. Four tower blocks, the first to be built in the city, and collectively known as the Duddeston Four, the 12-storey High, Queens, Home and South Towers, were all completed between 1954 and 1955. The design by SN Cooke and Partners consists of a stretched X-shaped footprint, with brick cladding on a steel-frame. Porthole-shaped windows overlook grassed areas. The design was expensive and upon their completion, they were criticised by the council over their cost, despite receiving positive reviews from the "Municipal Journal" and "Architectural Review". In the 1990s, the blocks were refurbished and a new security system was installed, while other multi-storey tower blocks in the area were demolished and replaced by low-rise housing, continuing the theme of low-rise housing in the area which began in the 1970s.

=== Notable people ===
- Samuel "John" Galton Jr. FRS, (1753–1832), was born in Duddeston.
- William Amey VC MM, (1881–1940), recipient of the Victoria Cross in World War I, was born in Duddeston.

Reggae band, Musical Youth

== Transport ==
Duddeston railway station is served by trains on the Cross-City Line and the Walsall Line.
