= Newton Road railway station =

Former railway station in England

Newton Road
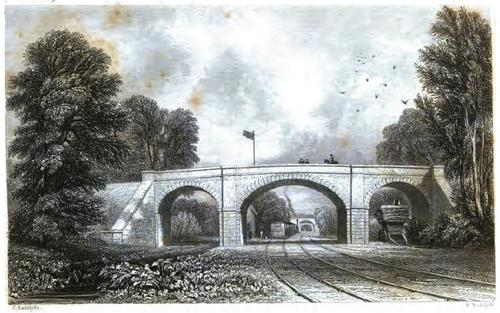
- The former Newton Road station

General information
- Location: West Bromwich, Metropolitan Borough of Sandwell; England
- Coordinates: 52.5396°N 1.9636°W
- Grid reference: SP025935
- Platforms: 2

Other information
- Status: Disused

History
- Original company: Grand Junction Railway
- Pre-grouping: London and North Western Railway
- Post-grouping: London, Midland and Scottish Railway

Key dates
- 4 July 1837: Opened
- 1 March 1863: Moved
- 1 January 1902: Return to original site
- 7 May 1945: Closure
Location

Newton Road railway station was a station of the London and North Western Railway in Sandwell between West Bromwich and Great Barr, England. It lay between Hamstead and the later Tame Bridge Parkway stations on what is now known as the Chase Line.

As one of the original Grand Junction Railway stations, Newton Road opened in 1837, (Note: First station: grid reference SP025935; 52.5399°N 1.9639°W) but under subsequent LNWR control, it was deemed that a more suitable site should be found, and the station was shifted a short distance north-west along the track in 1863 to the junction of Ray Hall Lane with the railway, at a location now buried under the M5 motorway. (Note: Second station: grid reference SP022939; 52.5439°N 1.9679°W)

However, this move yielded few dividends in passenger numbers, so the station was shifted back near its original position on Newton Road in 1902, where it stayed until final closure in 1945.

== Incidents ==
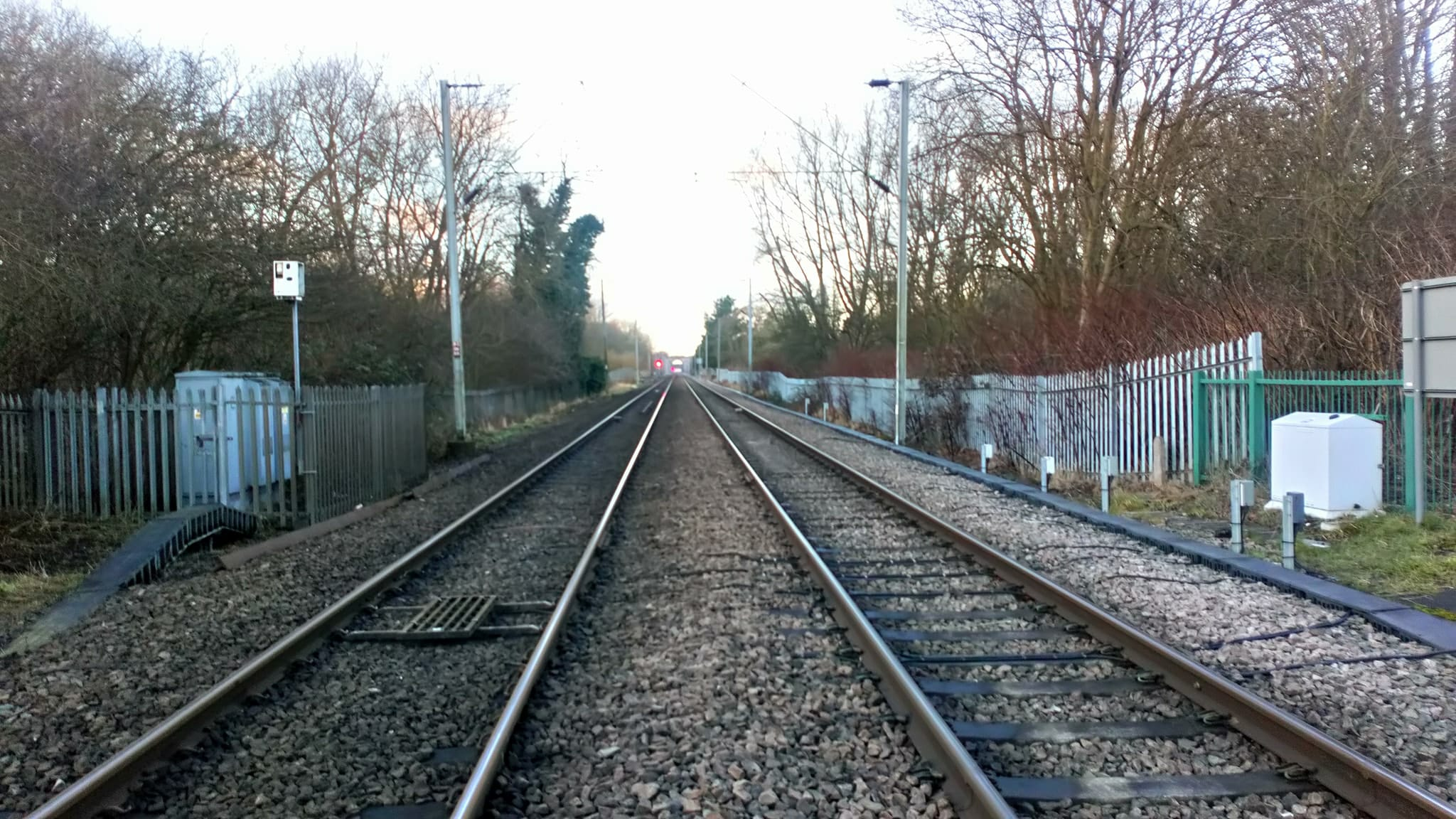
Site of the 2nd Newton Road station

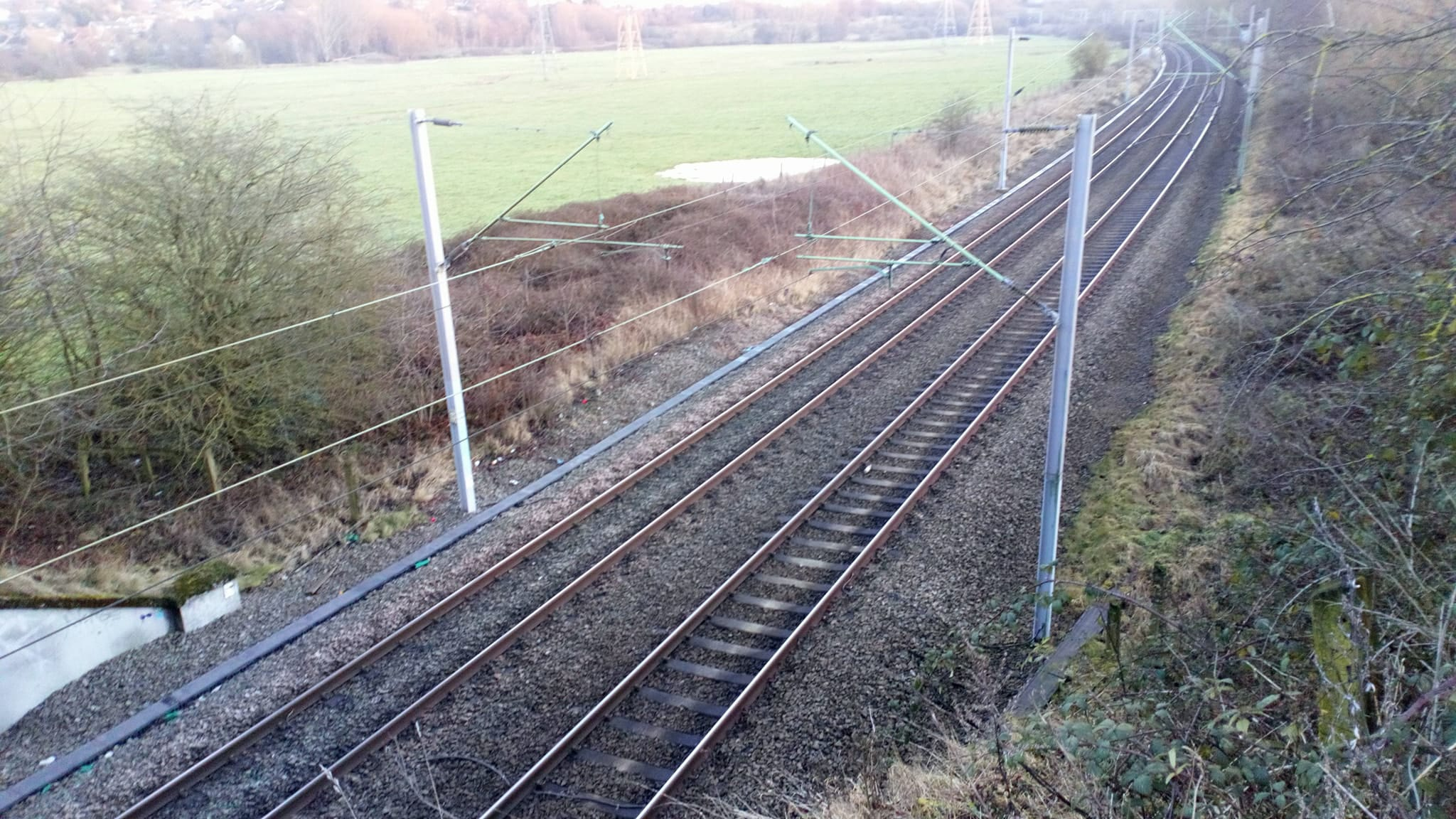
The site of the final Newton Road station

On 2 September 1848 a LNWR express train, comprising a locomotive, tender, luggage van and three passenger carriages, from Stafford to Birmingham departed from Wolverhampton 25 minutes behind schedule. Passengers noticed unusual osculations, and those in the rear carriage, which belonged to the Scottish Central Railway, reported a series of bangs, after which the train derailed, coming to rest about a quarter of a mile past Newton Road station. A light engine travelling in the other direction - and with Francis Trevithick aboard - struck the wreckage and was also derailed. At least one passenger died as a result of the initial derailment.

== Coordinates ==
Preceding station	Disused railways	Following station
Hamstead	Grand Junction Railway; Later London and North Western Railway	Bescot Stadium
