= Jeremiah Clark =

- Born: 1734
- Died: May 1809
- Occupations: Organist, composer, harpsichordist, violinist

Jeremiah Clark (Note: Some sources misspell his surname "Clarke", causing confusion with Jeremiah Clarke.) (1734–1809), was an English organist and composer. He was active in Birmingham, and became organist of Worcester Cathedral, where he had been a chorister in his youth.

== Career ==
Jeremiah Clark was born, probably at Worcester, in 1734, the son of Charles Clark, a lay vicar of Worcester Cathedral. He was educated as a chorister in the cathedral choir (of which he was subsequently a lay clerk) under Elias Isaac (1734-1793), for many years organist at the Cathedral.

He became responsible for organising concerts at Vauxhall Gardens in Birmingham, at which he also played the violin, in or before 1768.

Between 1770 and 1780 Clark seems to have settled in Birmingham as an organist and teacher of music. He served as organist at St. Mary's Church, and was organist of St. Philip's Church from 1765 to 1803, at which point he was dismissed due to excessive absences in relation to commercial performances elsewhere.

He played at the Birmingham Music Festival in 1778, and on 27 April 1789 a choral "Constitutional Ode" written by him in commemoration of the recovery of King George III, was performed at the public thanks-giving in the town.

In June 1795 he was announced to play the harpsichord at the opening season of the newly-rebullt New Street Theatre, and on 27 November 1797 he led a concert for the benefit of the widows and orphans of the killed at the battle of Camperdown.

Aris's Gazette wrote of one of his forthcoming 1798 concerts:

When we recollect how highly the lovers of harmony were gratified by the admirable performance gratuitously directed by this Gentleman, for the Benefit of the Widows and Orphans of the brave Seamen who were killed or wounded in that ever memorable action, we cannot doubt that the public in general, and the inhabitants of this town in particular, will display their usual liberality upon the occasion, and we are persuaded the performance will be such as will amply repay their generosity.

Clark took the degree of Bachelor of Music at the University of Oxford, matriculating in February 1799, though his name does not occur in the published lists of graduates.

In 1800 he was appointed organist of Worcester Cathedral, in which capacity he conducted the Three Choirs Festival in 1806.

He also undertook some private teaching work.

Clark died at Bromsgrove in May 1809.

The Dictionary of National Biography say that "his works show him to have been a clever musician"; and that he was "much patronised by Lord Dudley and Ward". (Note: One of William Ward, 3rd Viscount Dudley and Ward, who succeeded his half-brother John Ward, 2nd Viscount 1788, who had in turn succeeded his father John Ward, 1st Viscount in 1774.).

== Works ==
cover of Eight Songs with the Instrumental Parts Set to Musick by Jeremiah Clark of Worcester

Clark's published compositions include:

- Eight Songs with the Instrumental Parts Set to Musick by Jeremiah Clark of Worcester (1763, no number)
- Eight Songs, with Instruments Parts in Score Composed by Jeremiah Clark Organist in Birmingham, (1766, op. 2)
- Six Sonata's [sic] For the Harpsichord or Piano forte with Accompanyments For Two Violins & Violoncello, Composed & Humbly Dedicated to the Right Hon.ble the Countess of Donegall, by Jeremiah Clarke, Organist In Birmingham (London, 1779, op. 3)
- Ten Songs, With instrumental Parts in Score, Composed & most humbly inscribed To The Marquis of Donegall by Jeremiah Clark, Organist, Birmingham (London, 1791, op. 4)

These were sold by subscription, and among the subscribers were increasingly fellow musicians, including other cathedral organists, members of the region's nobility, and booksellers, suggesting that Clark was both well-connected and held in high professional regard, which grew over the period of their publication.

Other known works include the aforementioned "Constitutional Ode" (1789), two glees for three voices (1791), a series of instructions for singers, and Eight Songs and Four Canzonets (1799), "dedicated (by permission) to the Right Honourable Lord Viscount Dudley and Ward",. although these are lost.
