= Aston railway station =

Railway station in the West Midlands, England

Aston
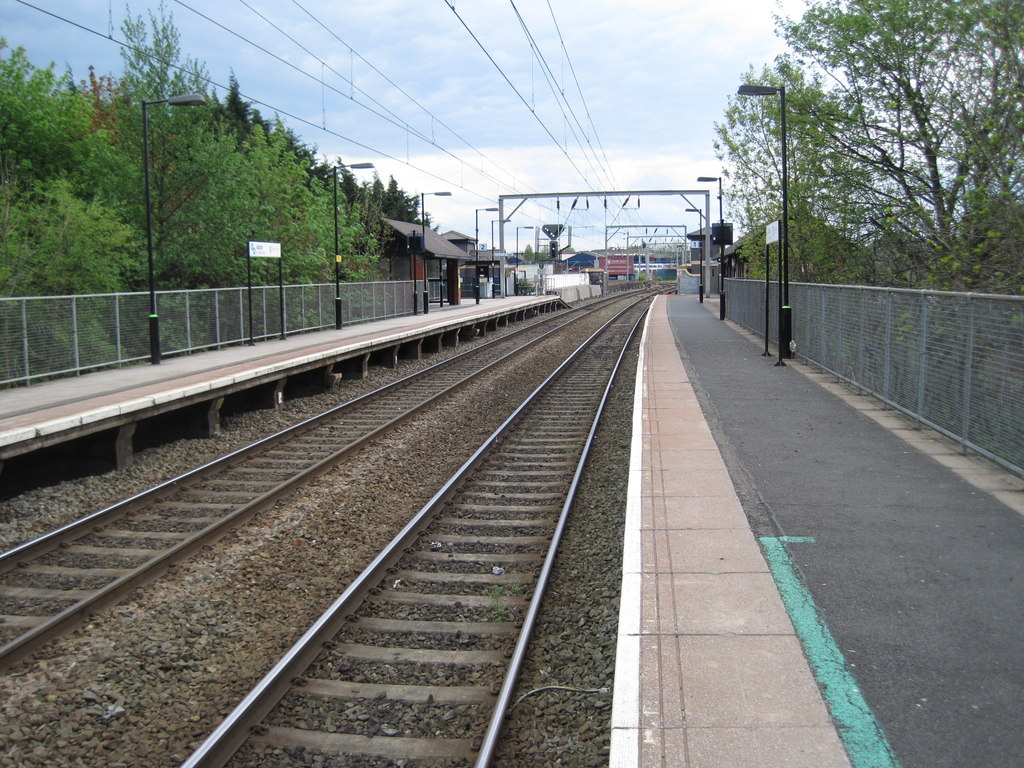
- Aston station

General information
- Location: Aston, Birmingham, England
- Coordinates: 52.504°N 1.872°W
- Grid reference: SP087896
- Manager: West Midlands Railway
- Transit authority: Transport for West Midlands
- Platforms: 2

Other information
- Station code: AST
- Fare zone: 2
- Classification: DfT category E

Passengers
- 2021/22: ▲0.388 million
- 2022/23: ▲0.555 million
- 2023/24: ▲0.632 million
- 2024/25: ▼0.613 million
- 2025/26: ▲0.661 million
Location
Notes
- Passenger statistics from the Office of Rail and Road

Aston railway station serves the districts of Aston and Nechells in Birmingham, West Midlands, England. It is a stop on both the Cross-City and Chase lines. It is one of two local stations for Aston Villa Football Club (the other being Witton) and is near to both the Aston Expressway and the Gravelly Hill Interchange (Spaghetti Junction).

== History ==
The route of the Grand Junction Railway, sweeping in a wide arc from Perry Barr through Aston to its terminus at Vauxhall, was dictated by the refusal of James Watt the younger, the tenant of Aston Hall, to allow the railway to encroach upon Aston Park in the grounds of the hall as planned in the Grand Junction Railway Act 1833 (3 & 4 Will. 4. c. xxxiv). The line was originally intended to enter Birmingham through a mile-long tunnel under the high ground on which the park is situated. In clause IV of the Grand Junction Railway (Wolverhampton Branch) Act 1834 (4 & 5 Will. 4. c. lv), the Grand Junction was forbidden from:

"enter(ing) upon or into, take, injure or damage, for the purposes of this Act...any Part of a certain Park lying within the parish of Aston-juxta-Birmingham in the County of Warwick, and Handsworth in the County of Stafford, known by the name of Aston Park..."

In 1846, the Grand Junction was one of several railways which were merged and incorporated into the London and North Western Railway (LNWR). Aston was opened by the LNWR in 1854 and became a junction in 1862, when a line was opened to Sutton Coldfield by the same railway.

In 1880, the LNWR opened a line from Aston to Stechford, on the Birmingham to Coventry line, which also gave access to the Metropolitan Carriage and Wagon Company's works (later Metro-Cammell) at Saltley. It was reached by a short private siding, known in LMS days as the Metropolitan Siding, opened in 1904; this is what the LNWR termed Washwood Heath Junction, at the point where the Aston-Stechford line passed over the Midland Railway from Birmingham to Derby. The Metropolitan Siding descended on an incline from Washwood Heath Junction and was the subject of detailed instructions on the working of trains and prevention of what the instructions term "breakaway wagons" on the siding. The new line was also used for the Wolverhampton portions of some London expresses and also to provide through carriages between Euston and Walsall. In May 2022 the arched viaduct carrying the Aston-Stechford line was replaced with a new steel bridge, 92 metres long with space below for the future HS2 tracks to run parallel to the Birmingham-Derby line.

The first station at Aston was replaced by a new building during the construction of the Stechford line, with a booking office level with Lichfield Road. Stairs and hydraulic lifts for goods traffic gave access to each of the two platforms.

Also in 1880, the LNWR opened a line for freight traffic from Aston to Windsor Street goods depot. The latter line closed in 1980. The LNWR's Aston locomotive depot ("Aston Shed") was opened in 1883, in the area between the Aston to Birmingham and the Aston to Stechford lines; it had an entrance on Long Acre, Nechells. It was closed in 1965, by then under British Railways ownership.

The line between Aston, Vauxhall and Duddeston was quadrupled in 1891.

In 1900, a connection to Nechells gas works was opened from a point near Nechells Park Road bridge on the line towards Birmingham New Street. When the gasworks closed in 1969, the branch was taken out of use at the same time. Although the tracks have been lifted, the embankment on which it ran remains substantially intact.

The station became part of the London, Midland and Scottish Railway during the Grouping of 1923. It then passed to the London Midland Region of British Railways on nationalisation in 1948.

When sectorisation was introduced, the station was served by Regional Railways on behalf of the West Midlands PTE, for whom British Rail had been running the trains since the PTE's inception.

In 2011, London Midland, proposed a major reduction in the opening hours of the ticket office, with complete closure at weekends.

=== Electrification and resignalling ===
Apart from the Sutton Coldfield branch, all of the routes passing through Aston, including the Windsor Street branch, were electrified in 1966 as part of the London Midland Region's electrification programme. The line from Coventry to Walsall, via Aston, was energised on 15 August 1966.

In preparation for electrification, Aston's two mechanical signal boxes, Aston No. 1 and No. 2, were closed; semaphore signalling was replaced by multiple-aspect colour light signals and control transferred to the power signal box at Birmingham New Street.

Electrification of the line to Sutton and Lichfield was completed in 1992, as part of the modernisation of the Cross-City Line.

In 2017, control of the signalling at Aston was transferred to the West Midlands Signalling Centre at Saltley.

=== Former services ===
==== Nineteenth century ====
In January 1858, there were eight trains from Aston (originating in Birmingham) to Wolverhampton via Bescot Junction and Willenhall: the first at 08:21 and the last at 21:11 on weekdays. In the opposite direction, on weekdays, nine trains from Wolverhampton arrived at Aston between 08:51 and 22:25. The Sunday service consisted of six trains in each direction. The timetable shows one "government" or Parliamentary train in each direction, running every day. Most trains provided through carriages to Derby via Walsall and Lichfield, dividing at Bescot.

==== Twentieth century ====
In the LNWR timetable dated 3 October 1921, the service to and from Lichfield City (the extension from Sutton Coldfield to Lichfield was opened in 1884) is shown as roughly hourly on weekdays, with additional trains terminating at Four Oaks approximately every 30 minutes. On Sundays five trains ran to and from Sutton. Trains to Wolverhampton and Walsall ran at irregular intervals on weekdays, with service of five trains to and from Walsall on Sundays. An interesting service was the New Street to New Street circular via Aston, Perry Barr, Soho Road and Monument Lane, with two trains completing the full anti-clockwise circuit, but only one in the opposite direction. Most clockwise trains finished their journey at Vauxhall and Duddeston. There was no Sunday service.

Trains on the circular route are shown in the Summer 1939 London, Midland and Scottish Railway timetable as taking 43 minutes for the complete New Street-New Street circuit. Otherwise, the pattern of services in the months leading up to the outbreak of the Second World War had hardly changed since 1921.

The London Midland Region timetable dated 10 September 1951 shows an irregular interval service of approximately hourly trains to and from Walsall and a similar service to Lichfield City via Sutton, with some trains running only as far as Four Oaks (tables 68 and 69). In the Summer 1963 timetable, by which time diesel multiple units were operating on both routes, there was a regular-interval service pattern throughout the day: on weekdays every hour to Walsall and Rugeley Town, and every 30 minutes to Sutton and Lichfield, with occasional trains still terminating at Four Oaks.

After electrification, services to Walsall were operated by Class AM4 (later redesignated Class 304) electric multiple units. The 1970-1971 London Midland timetable (table 9) shows a weekdays only service of regular-interval hourly trains throughout the day, augmented at peak periods with additional services. There was also one service, originating at Walsall, which left Aston at 07:17 for Coventry via Stechford. (There was no corresponding service in the Walsall direction). The Sutton and Lichfield service was largely unchanged from 1963 on weekdays but there was now no Sunday service.

The above patterns applied also to trains to and from Birmingham New Street, where all trains from Aston to Walsall and Four Oaks or Lichfield originated.

Following the introduction of the Cross-City Line in 1978, Aston gained through trains to and from Longbridge via Birmingham New Street. The basic pattern was Lichfield to Longbridge and vice versa hourly throughout the day Monday-Saturday, with additional trains running from Four Oaks to Longbridge and vice versa at 15-minute intervals. There were also additional trains to and from Redditch at peak times. On Sundays, Aston was served by a 30-minute frequency of trains to and from Four Oaks and Longbridge. Trains were operated by Class 108 diesel multiple units. The Walsall service remained basically unchanged from 1970 to 1971, with no Sunday service.

== Location ==
The station is situated adjacent to and above the Lichfield Road (A5127); it is crossed by a bridge as the railway line, part of the original Grand Junction Railway that opened in 1837, is on an embankment through what was "pastoral parkland" at the time of its construction. The line also crosses the Birmingham and Fazeley Canal, just south of Lichfield Road, on a bridge which is all that remains of a longer viaduct of ten arches, described as "one of the most beautiful structures on the line of the Grand Junction".

The section of the viaduct crossing Lichfield Road, immediately south of the station, was replaced by a steel bridge in 1906.

== Services ==
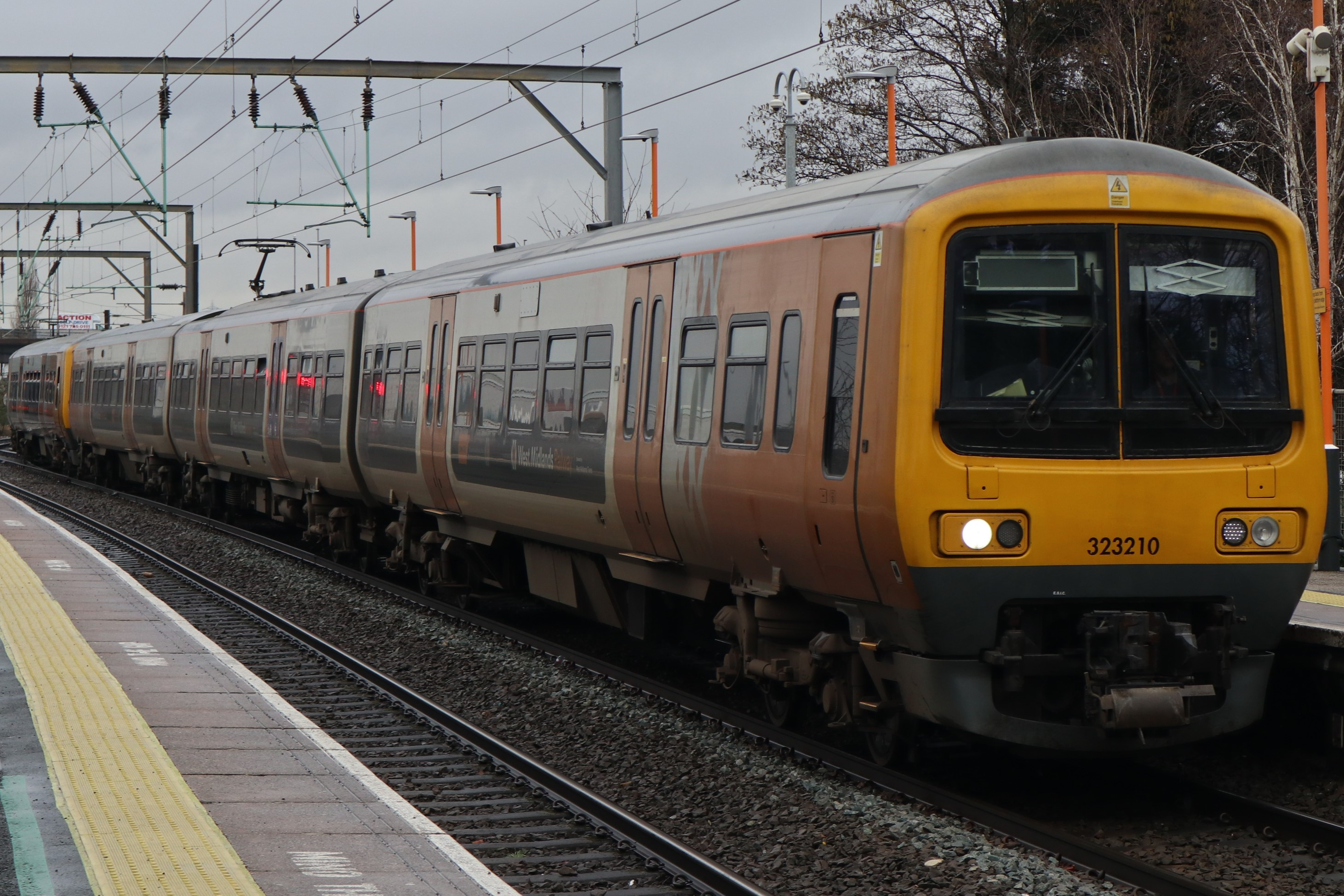
A Class 323 in 2024

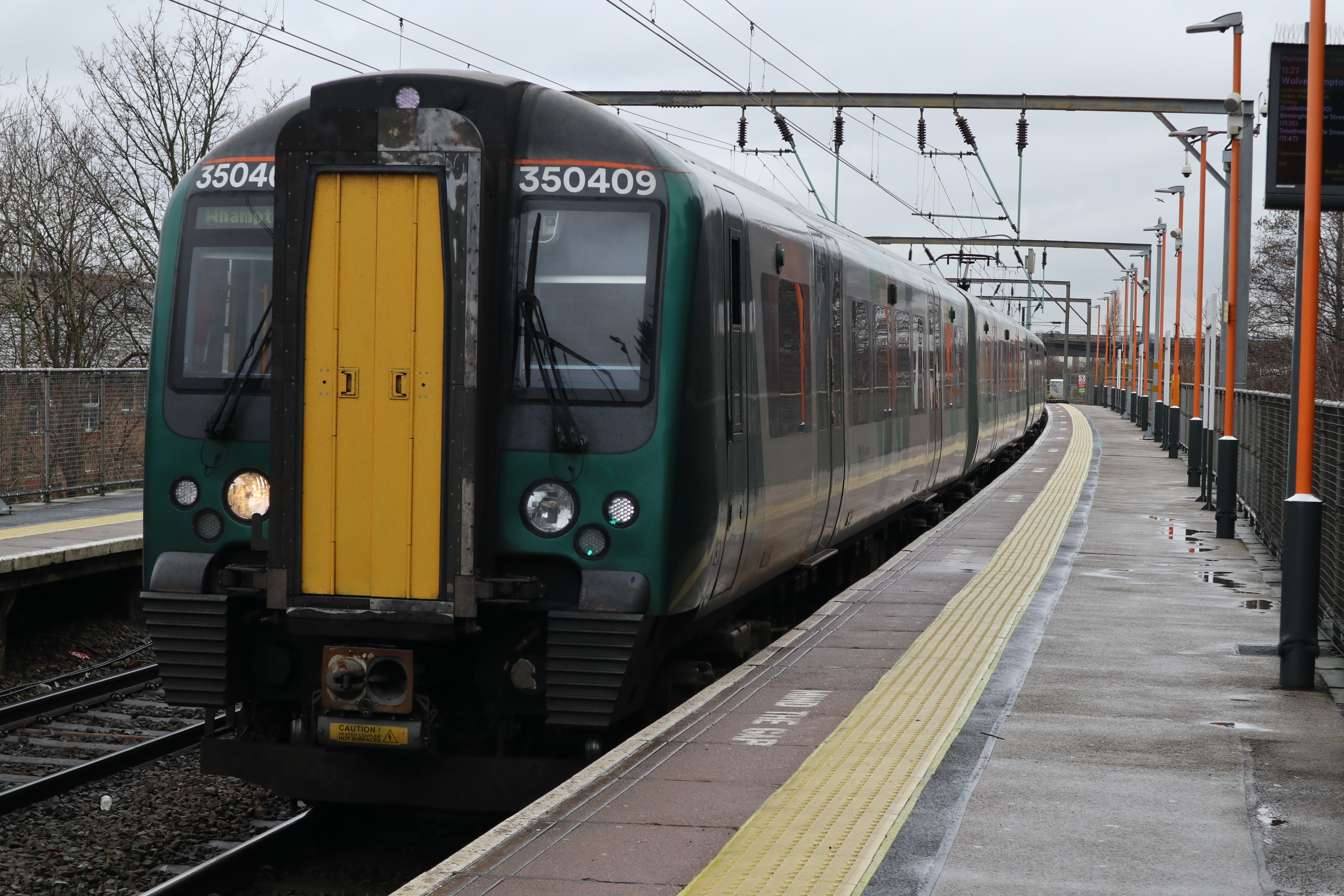
A Class 350 in 2024

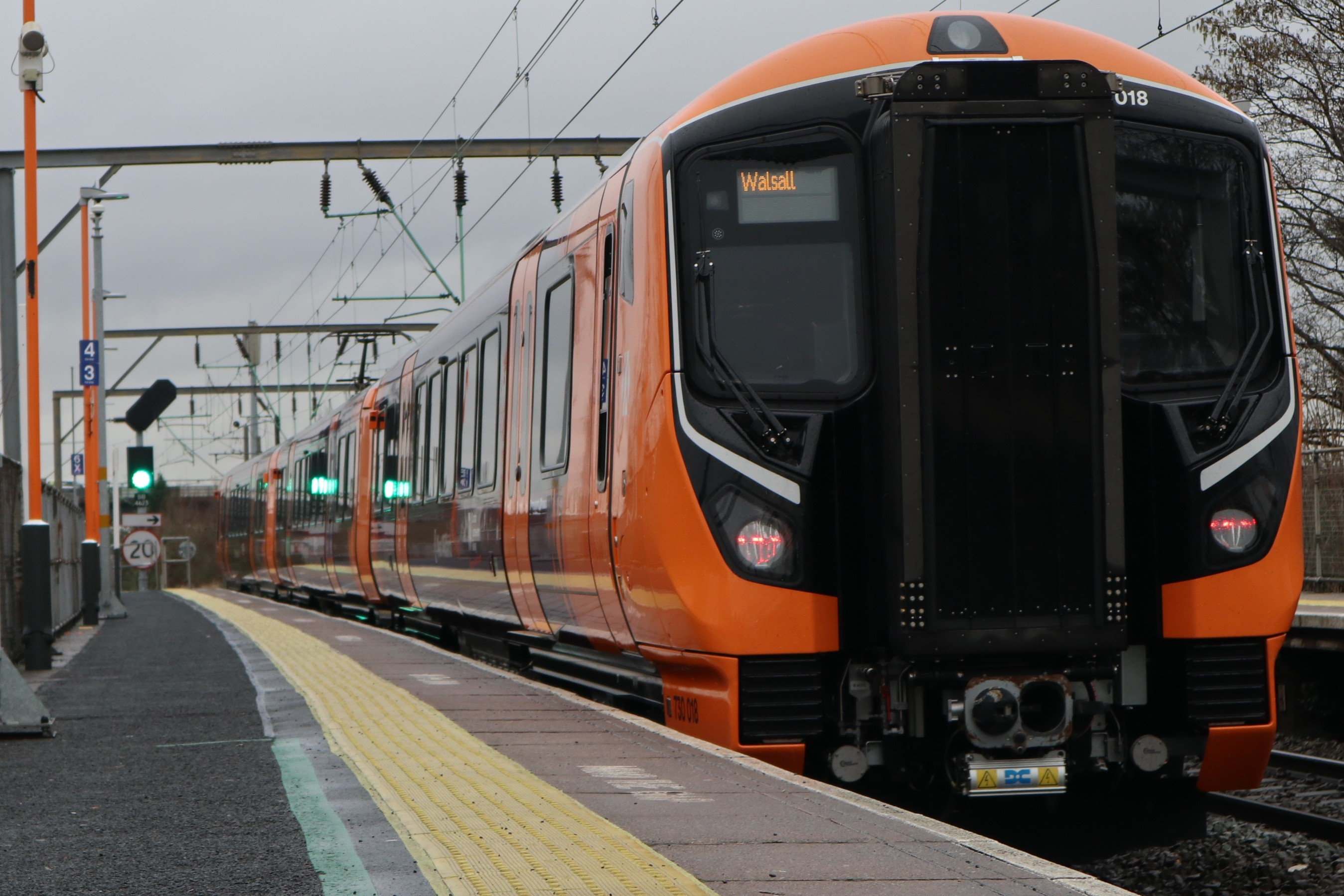
A Class 730 with a service to Walsall departing from platform 1, February 2024

West Midlands Railway operates the following typical service pattern, in trains per hour:

Mondays to Saturdays:

- 4 tph northbound to Four Oaks, via Sutton Coldfield; of which:
  - 2 tph continue to Lichfield Trent Valley, via Lichfield City
- 2 tph to Walsall, via Tame Bridge Parkway; of which:
  - 2 tpd continue to Rugeley Trent Valley
- 6 tph southbound to Birmingham New Street, via Duddeston; of which:
  - 2 tph continue to Wolverhampton, via Smethwick Galton Bridge, calling at all stations from Smethwick Rolfe Street
  - 4 tph continue to Longbridge, via University, calling at all stations from Five Ways
    - 2 tph extend further to Redditch, via Alvechurch.
    - 2 tph extend further to Bromsgrove (1tph does not call at Barnt Green).

Sundays:

- 2 tph to Lichfield Trent Valley
- 1 tph to Walsall
- 2 tph to Redditch
- 1 tph to Wolverhampton.

The average journey time to Birmingham New Street is around 7 minutes.

Preceding station	National Rail	Following station
Gravelly Hill	West Midlands Railway Lichfield – Four Oaks – Birmingham – Bromsgrove/Redditch; Cross-City Line	Duddeston
Gravelly Hill	West Midlands Railway Lichfield – Four Oaks – Birmingham – Bromsgrove/Redditch; Cross-City Line	Birmingham New Street
Witton	West Midlands Railway Rugeley – Walsall – Birmingham – Wolverhampton; Chase Line	Duddeston
Witton	West Midlands Railway Rugeley – Walsall – Birmingham – Wolverhampton; Chase Line	Birmingham New Street

== Bus connections ==
Bus routes 65 and 67, operated by National Express West Midlands, serve the station.

== Amenities nearby ==
The station serves:

- Aston Hall
- Aston Events Centre
- Aston Villa F.C.
- Aston University
- Church of SS Peter & Paul, Aston
- King Edward VI Aston School.
