= Witton railway station =

Railway station in Birmingham, England

Witton
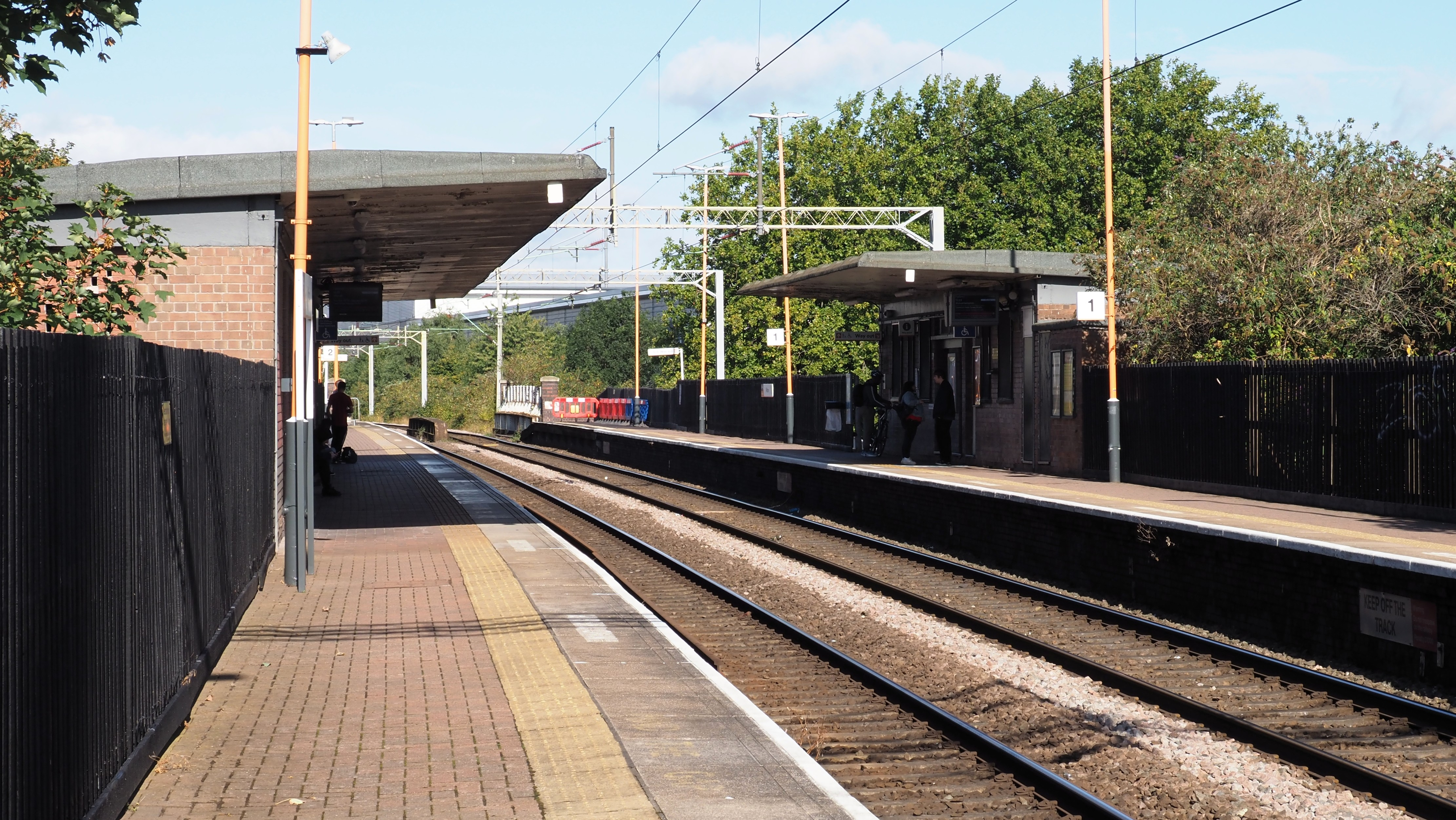
- Witton Station pictured in 2025

General information
- Location: Witton, Birmingham; England
- Coordinates: 52.512°N 1.883°W
- Grid reference: SP079904
- Manager: West Midlands Railway
- Transit authority: Transport for West Midlands
- Platforms: 2

Other information
- Station code: WTT
- Fare zone: 2
- Classification: DfT category E

History
- Opened: 1876

Passengers
- 2021/22: ▲0.169 million
- 2022/23: ▲0.191 million
- 2023/24: ▲0.309 million
- 2024/25: ▲0.342 million
- 2025/26: ▲0.465 million
Location
Notes
- Passenger statistics from the Office of Rail and Road

Witton railway station, opened in 1876, serves the Witton area of the city of Birmingham, England. It is situated on the Chase Line, part of the former Grand Junction Railway which opened in 1837. The line was electrified in 1966, as part of the London Midland Region's electrification programme; the line from Coventry to Walsall was energised on 15 August 1966. The station, and all trains serving it, are operated by West Midlands Trains.

The station sits above Witton Road, the A4040 Outer Ring Road, as the railway line here is on an embankment. It is the closest station to Villa Park, home of Aston Villa F.C. and is advertised as the station 'for Villa Park' on station signage. During Randy Lerner's ownership of Aston Villa, there had been discussions on changing the name of Witton station to Villa Park, as is the case with West Bromwich Albion's local station, The Hawthorns. Aston Villa's former CEO, Bruce Langham, said that the former West Midlands Passenger Transport Executive (Centro) were amenable to the idea as long as it is done at the expense of the club. No action has yet been taken.

== Facilities ==
The station is no longer staffed, its ticket office having been closed by London Midland in 2013. Tickets must now be purchased in advance, or from a self-service ticket machine on platform 2, or on the train. Waiting accommodation is provided in the brick buildings on both platforms, whilst train running information is given via timetable posters, CIS screens, help points and automatic announcements. Step-free access to both platforms is available via ramps from street level.

== Services ==
Witton is served by trains between Wolverhampton and Walsall via Birmingham New Street, operating every 30 minutes Monday-Saturday daytimes and every 60 minutes on Sundays. These services are operated by Class 730 electric multiple units. Extra services are run before and after matches or events at Villa Park on matchdays and event days with services northbound to Rugeley Trent Valley and shuttles to/from Birmingham New Street.

Preceding station	National Rail	Following station
Perry Barr	West Midlands Railway Walsall – Birmingham – Wolverhampton	Aston
Tame Bridge Parkway or Perry Barr	West Midlands Railway; Rugeley – Walsall – Birmingham; Limited service	Aston or Birmingham New Street
Terminus	West Midlands Railway; Witton – Birmingham New Street shuttles Matchdays and event days only	Birmingham New Street
