= Perry Barr railway station =

Railway station in the West Midlands, England

Perry Barr
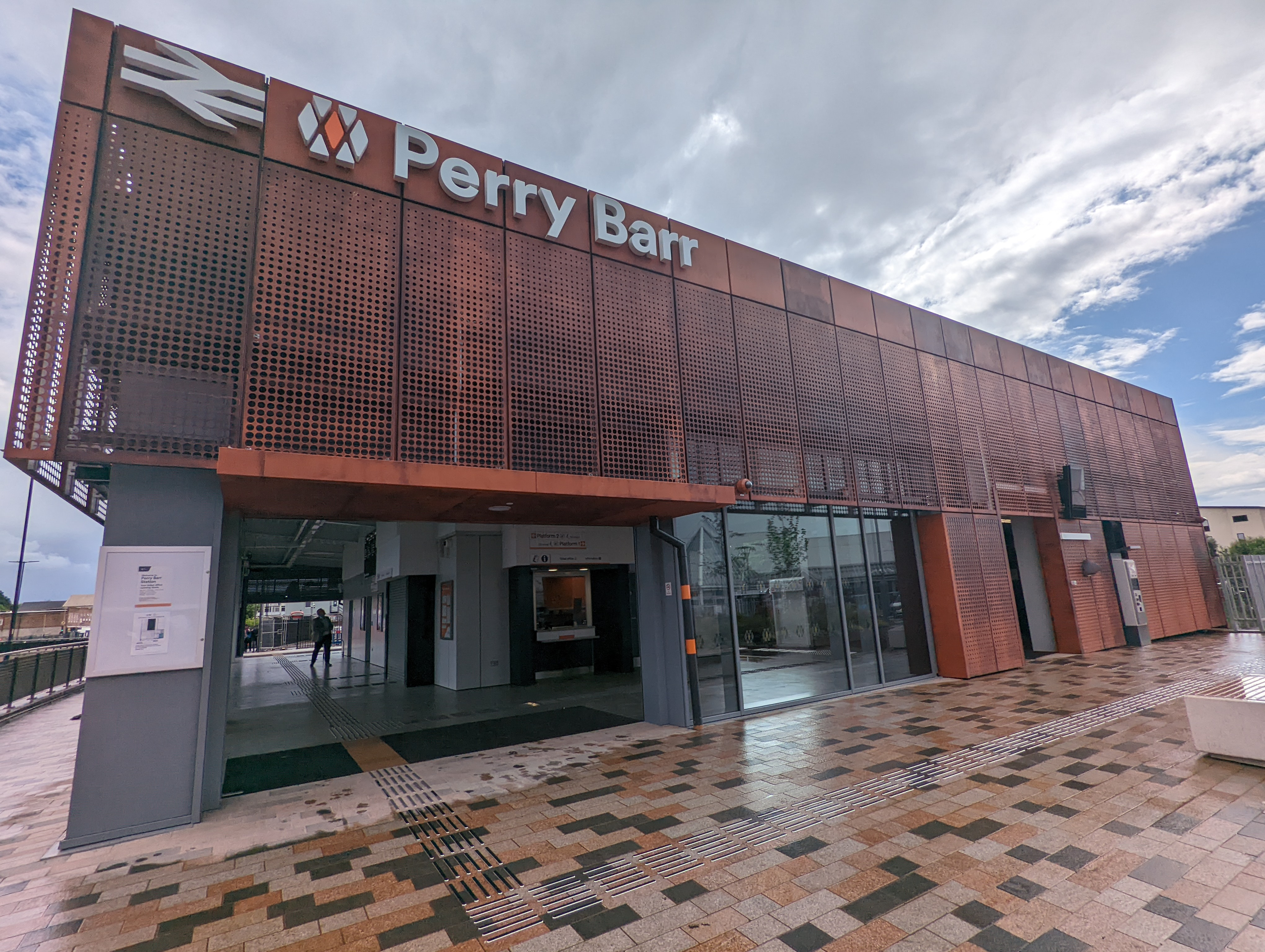
- The redeveloped station building in 2022

General information
- Location: Perry Barr, Birmingham; England
- Coordinates: 52.516°N 1.902°W
- Grid reference: SP066909
- Manager: West Midlands Railway
- Transit authority: Transport for West Midlands
- Platforms: 2

Other information
- Station code: PRY
- Fare zone: 2
- Classification: DfT category E

Key dates
- 4 July 1837: Opened by Grand Junction Railway

Passengers
- 2021/22: ▼30,362
- 2022/23: ▲0.139 million
- 2023/24: ▲0.176 million
- 2024/25: ▲0.185 million
- 2025/26: ▲0.232 million
Location
Notes
- Passenger statistics from the Office of Rail and Road

Perry Barr Railway Station is a railway station in Perry Barr, Birmingham, England, and is one of the oldest continuously operated railway station sites in the world, having first opened in 1837. The station has been rebuilt several times, including electrification of the line in the 1960s, and most recently in 2021-2022.

== History ==
The original station was built by the Grand Junction Railway in 1837, and so the station is the oldest one on its original site in the city, and one of the oldest continuously operated station sites in the world. At that time Perry Barr was an urban district in Staffordshire, being absorbed into Birmingham in 1911.

The Grand Junction became part of the London and North Western Railway (LNWR) in 1846, thence the London, Midland and Scottish Railway (LMS) in 1923, and each owned the station in turn. Together with the rest of Britain's railways it was nationalised in 1948.

=== 1960s redevelopment ===
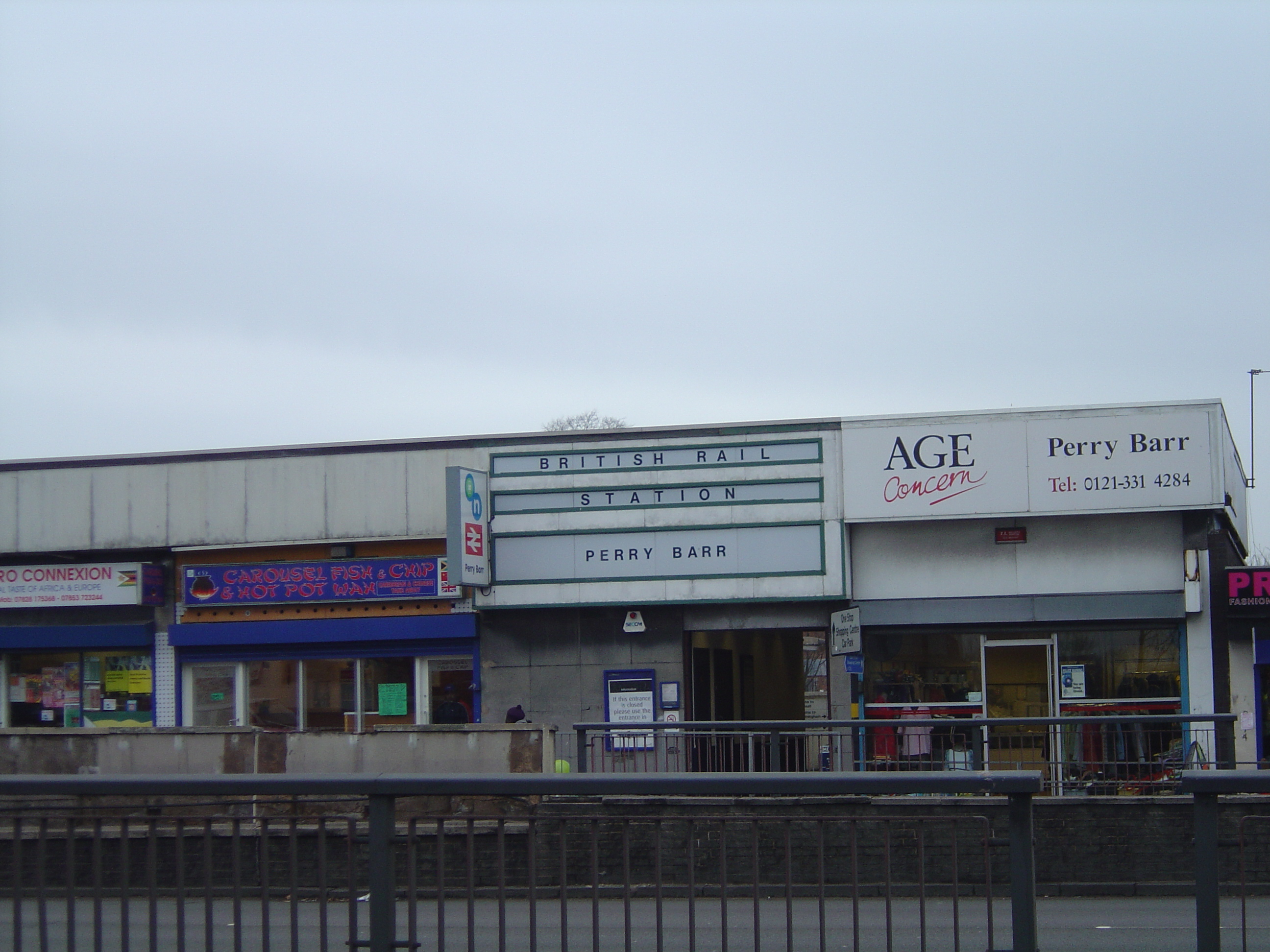
The 1960s station entrance in 2009

The station was rebuilt when the line was electrified in 1966 as part of the London Midland Region's electrification programme. The actual energization of the line from Coventry to Walsall through Aston took place on 15 August 1966. This version of the station included a number of retail units.

=== 2020s redevelopment ===
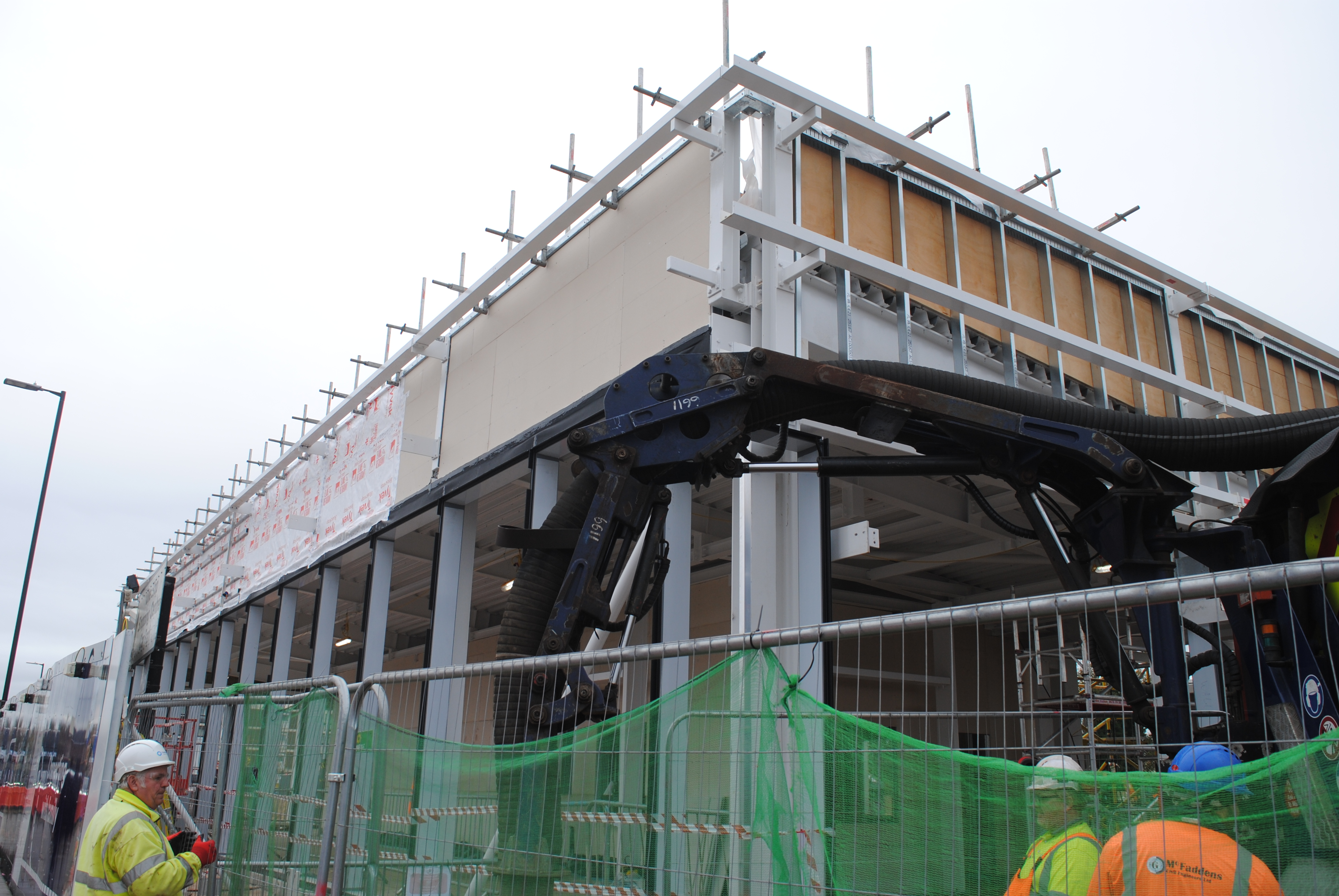
The part-complete new station building, 8 November 2021

In 2019, the West Midlands Rail Executive and Transport for West Midlands put forward proposals to redevelop Perry Barr station, along with a new bus interchange, in time for the Birmingham 2022 Commonwealth Games. Proposed designs were revealed in September 2020. Further revisions were proposed in December. The designs were approved and the station was closed on 10 May 2021 for redevelopment, with the station reopened on 29 May 2022. The new building has a bronze-coloured frieze depicting athletes. Retail units were not included.

== Features ==
The pedestrian entrance is on the A34 Walsall Road. The station has two side platforms, one each side of the two operating lines, with no points or sidings. The ticket office is on a bridge over the tracks, which are below street level. Both platforms have step-free access, lifts replacing the former ramps. It is staffed on a part-time basis throughout the week, and has a self-service ticket and Permit to Travel machine for use when the ticket office is closed. Waiting shelters and bench seating are provided at platform level, along with customer help points. Service information is given on information displays and by automated announcements.

As well as local residents, shops and businesses, it serves:

- Alexander Stadium
- Perry Hall Park
- a number of bus services, including the Outer Circle

== Services ==
The typical daytime service on weekdays and Saturdays has two trains per hour in each direction between Walsall and Birmingham New Street (and onwards to Wolverhampton via the Stour Valley Line) that are operated by Class 730 EMUs. Services are reduced to hourly on Sundays. There are a small number of services that extend past Walsall to Rugeley Trent Valley. On Mondays to Saturdays one early morning train starts from Rugeley Trent Valley.

The line also sees occasional use for diverted passenger trains between Birmingham New Street and Wolverhampton (and destinations further north), usually when the Stour Valley Line is closed for engineering work.

== Incidents ==
- On 22 December 1859 one passenger jumped from a Walsall to Birmingham train and was killed, and others were injured, due to the train, using South Staffordshire Railway rolling stock, being derailed by one of its carriages shedding a tyre.
- On 22 December 1895, Mark Robins, a LNWR guard, was killed while his goods train was waiting in a siding at the station for a faster football excursion train from Liverpool to Birmingham to pass. Due to fog, he did not see the approaching train, and was struck by it.

Preceding station	National Rail	Following station
Hamstead	West Midlands Railway Chase Line	Witton
Hamstead	West Midlands Railway Walsall-Birmingham New Street-Wolverhampton	Witton
	Historical railways	
Hamstead Line and station open	London and North Western Railway	Vauxhall Line open, station closed
