= Duddeston railway station =

Railway station in the West Midlands, England

Duddeston
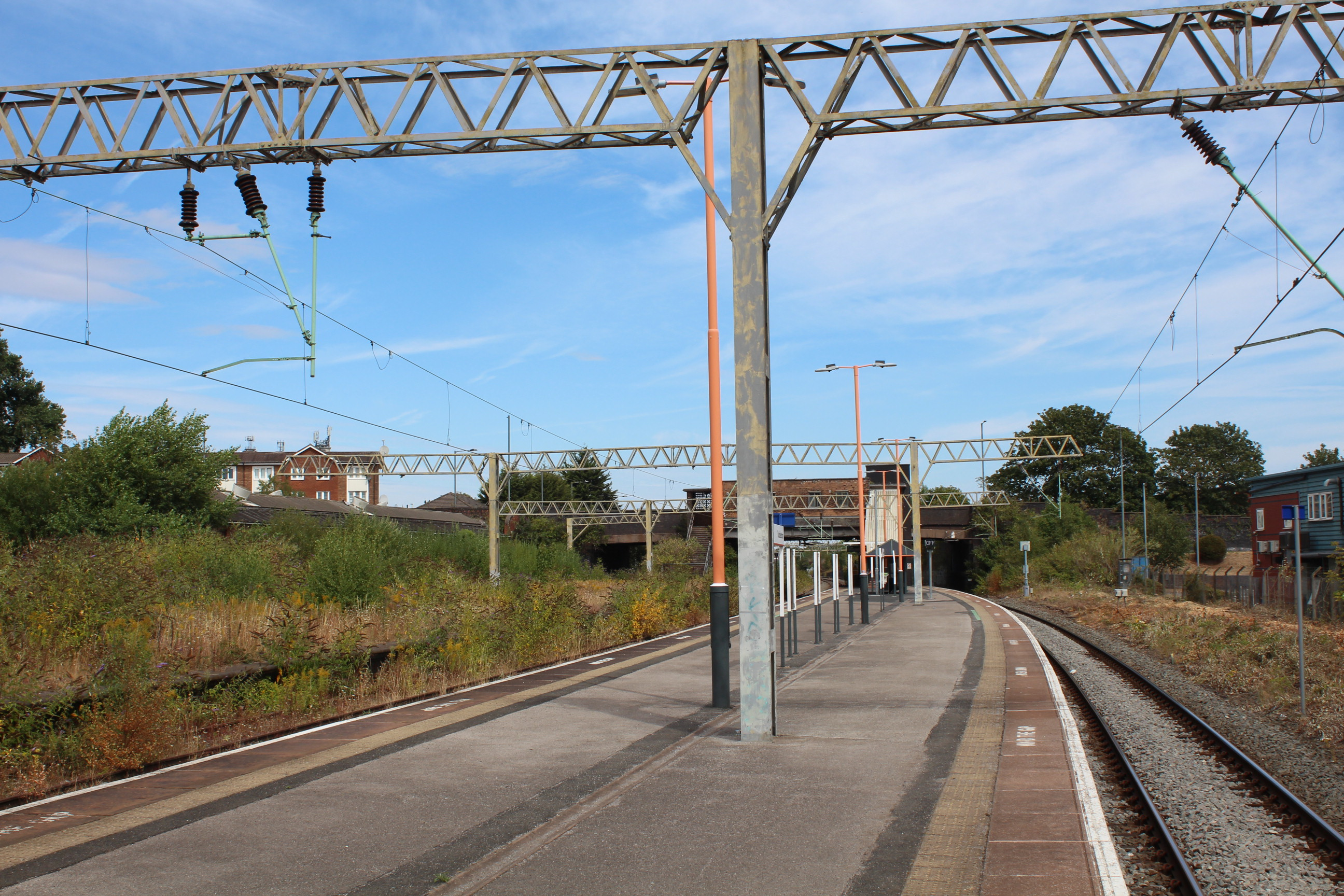
- Duddeston station in 2026, showing the overgrown platform and disused train sheds

General information
- Location: Duddeston, Birmingham; England
- Coordinates: 52.488°N 1.871°W
- Grid reference: SP088878
- Manager: West Midlands Railway
- Transit authority: Transport for West Midlands
- Platforms: 2

Other information
- Station code: DUD
- Fare zone: 2
- Classification: DfT category E

Key dates
- 1837: Opened as Vauxhall station
- 1869: Rebuilt and reopened
- 1889: renamed Vauxhall and Duddeston
- 6 May 1974: renamed Duddeston

Passengers
- 2021/22: ▲0.242 million
- 2022/23: ▲0.385 million
- 2023/24: ▼0.382 million
- 2024/25: ▼0.341 million
- 2025/26: ▼0.316 million
Location
Notes
- Passenger statistics from the Office of Rail and Road

Duddeston railway station serves the Duddeston area of Birmingham, England. It is sited on the Cross-City Line between Bromsgrove and Redditch in the south and Four Oaks and Lichfield Trent Valley in the north and the Chase Line between Birmingham International and Rugeley Trent Valley. Both lines run towards Birmingham New Street in the southbound direction.

== History ==
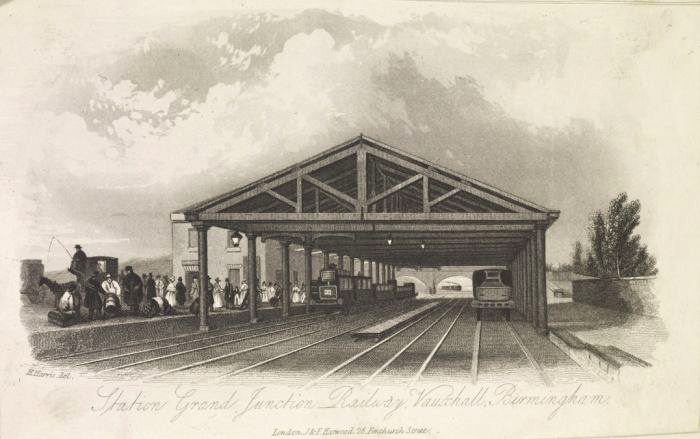
Vauxhall station in 1837

Duddeston opened in 1837 as Vauxhall, the temporary Birmingham terminus of the Grand Junction Railway from Warrington. When the permanent terminus at Curzon Street opened in 1839, Vauxhall became a goods-only station.

Bloomsbury and Nechells station opened nearby in 1856.

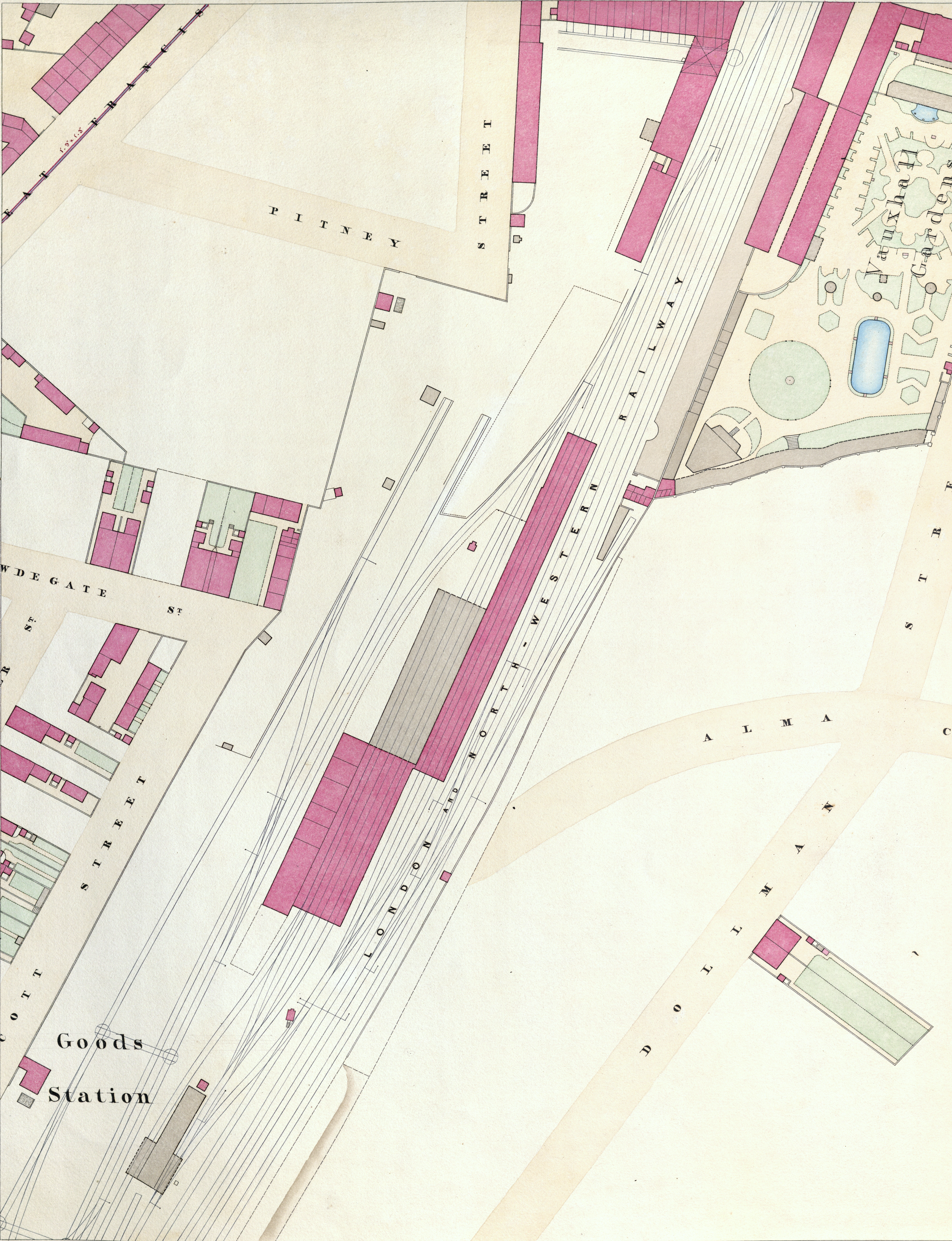
Vauxhall Station mapped in the "New Survey of the Borough of Birmingham" (surveyed from 1851, published 1855, sheet 82), showing the adjacent gardens

An extract from an 1859 railway inspector's report into a minor collision reveals something of how the station was operated:

There are sidings on both sides of the main line, and the station being on a curve, and the view interrupted by buildings, it is necessary to have a series of signalmen at short intervals for the protection of the switches and crossings connected with the main line

One of these signalmen (for the protection of the down line), when he had any shunting to do, had to warn a signalman on his right by turning on a disc signal; and he had also to work the arm of a semaphore signal on the Birmingham side of the station to stop all down trains on the main line.

The station was rebuilt and re-opened to passengers in 1869 under the LNWR, and Bloomsbury and Nechells station closed. The station was renamed Vauxhall and Duddeston in 1889.

In 1941 it was hit by a bomb during a night raid and was destroyed. It was rebuilt in a temporary fashion, and in the mid-1950s it caught fire and was subsequently rebuilt.

The line through the station, to Walsall via Perry Barr, was electrified in 1966 as part of the London Midland Region's electrification programme. The actual energization of the line from Coventry to Walsall through Perry Barr took place on 15 August 1966.

The station was renamed Duddeston on 6 May 1974.

The entrance and ticket hall are over the tracks, on the Duddeston Mill Road bridge. The former Midland Railway line to Derby is nearby.

Adjacent are railway sheds that were once used for industrial purposes. They are now disused and the entrance has been blocked to prevent trespassing. A shed on the opposite side of the station to the remaining sheds has been demolished and its site is wasteland. The station has two island platforms serving four tracks, but only one island platform and two tracks remain in use; the others have fallen into disrepair.

The remaining platform features artwork on black metal backgrounds.

== Facilities ==
The station has a ticket office located on the concourse, though it is open from 08:00 to 10:00 on Mondays to Fridays only. There is also a ticket machine on the concourse.

In 2011, London Midland proposed the closure of the ticket office. The request was denied.

== Services ==
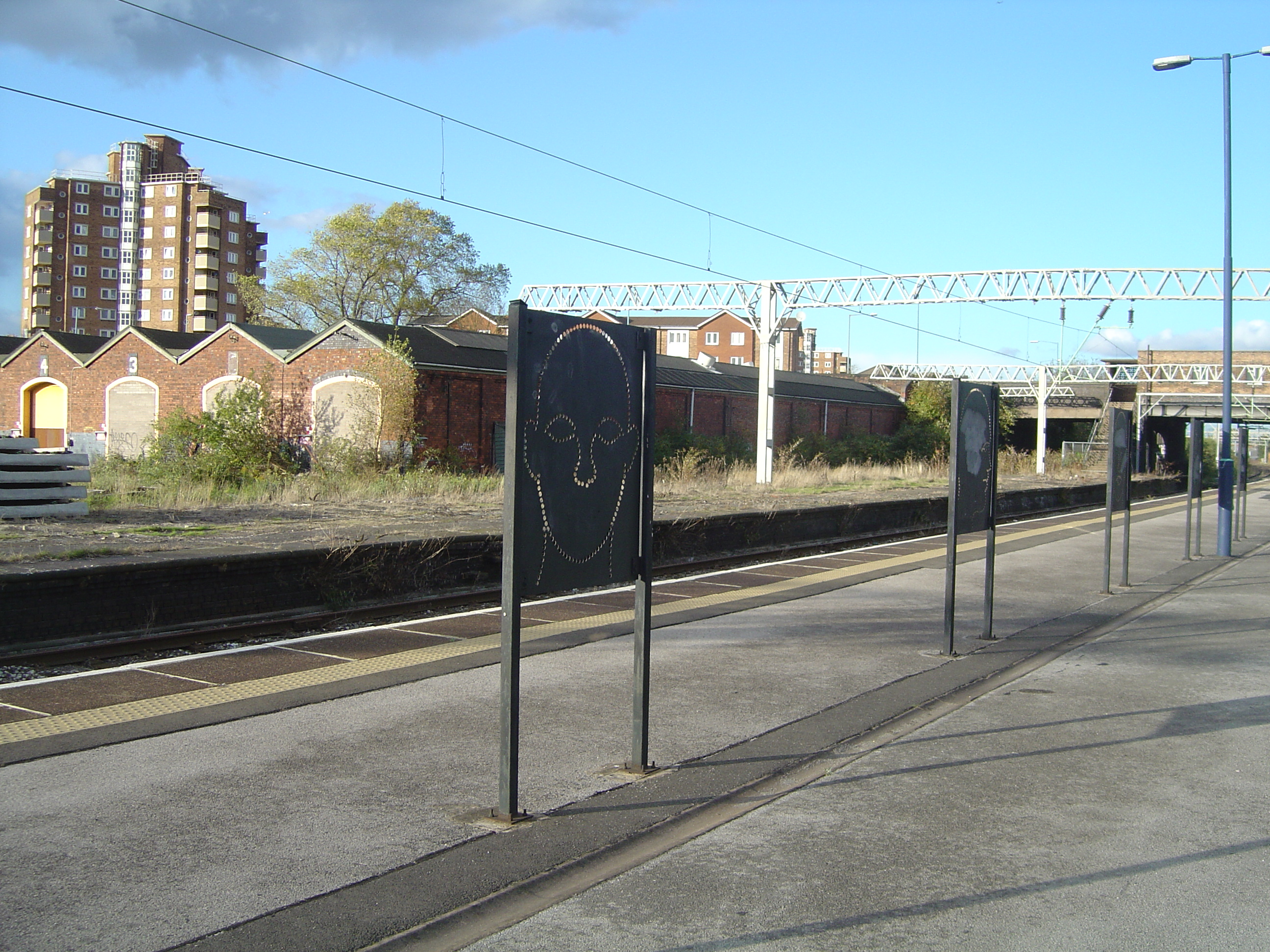
Platform artwork and disused sheds seen in 2008

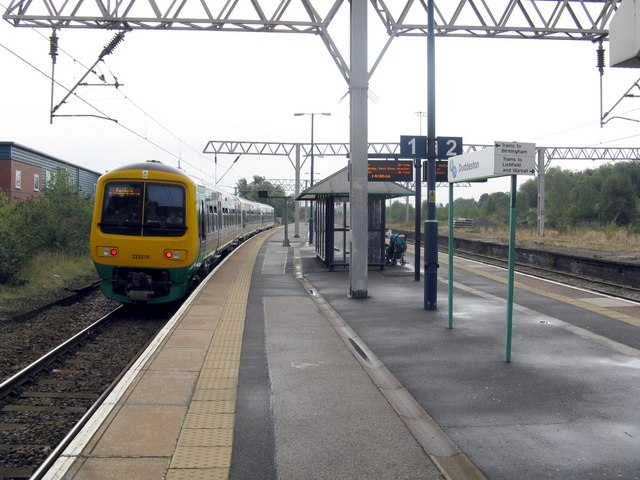
A London Midland Class 323 departs Duddeston with a service to Redditch in 2008

Duddeston is served by West Midlands Trains with services on both the Cross-City Line and the Chase Line. Services are operated using Class 730 Electric multiple units.

The typical service pattern is as follows:

=== Mondays to Saturdays ===
- 4 trains per hour (tph) northbound to Aston.
  - Of which:
    - 2 tph continue northbound to Lichfield Trent Valley via Sutton Coldfield, calling at all stations Aston to Lichfield Trent Valley, departing from Platform 1.
    - 2 tph continue to Walsall via Tame Bridge Parkway, calling at all stations Aston to Walsall, departing from Platform 1.
- 4 tph southbound to Birmingham New Street
  - Of which:
    - 2 tph continue southbound to Bromsgrove via University and Longbridge, calling at all stations Five Ways to Bromsgrove.
    - 2tph continue to Wolverhampton via Smethwick Galton Bridge, calling at all stations Smethwick Rolfe Street to Wolverhampton.

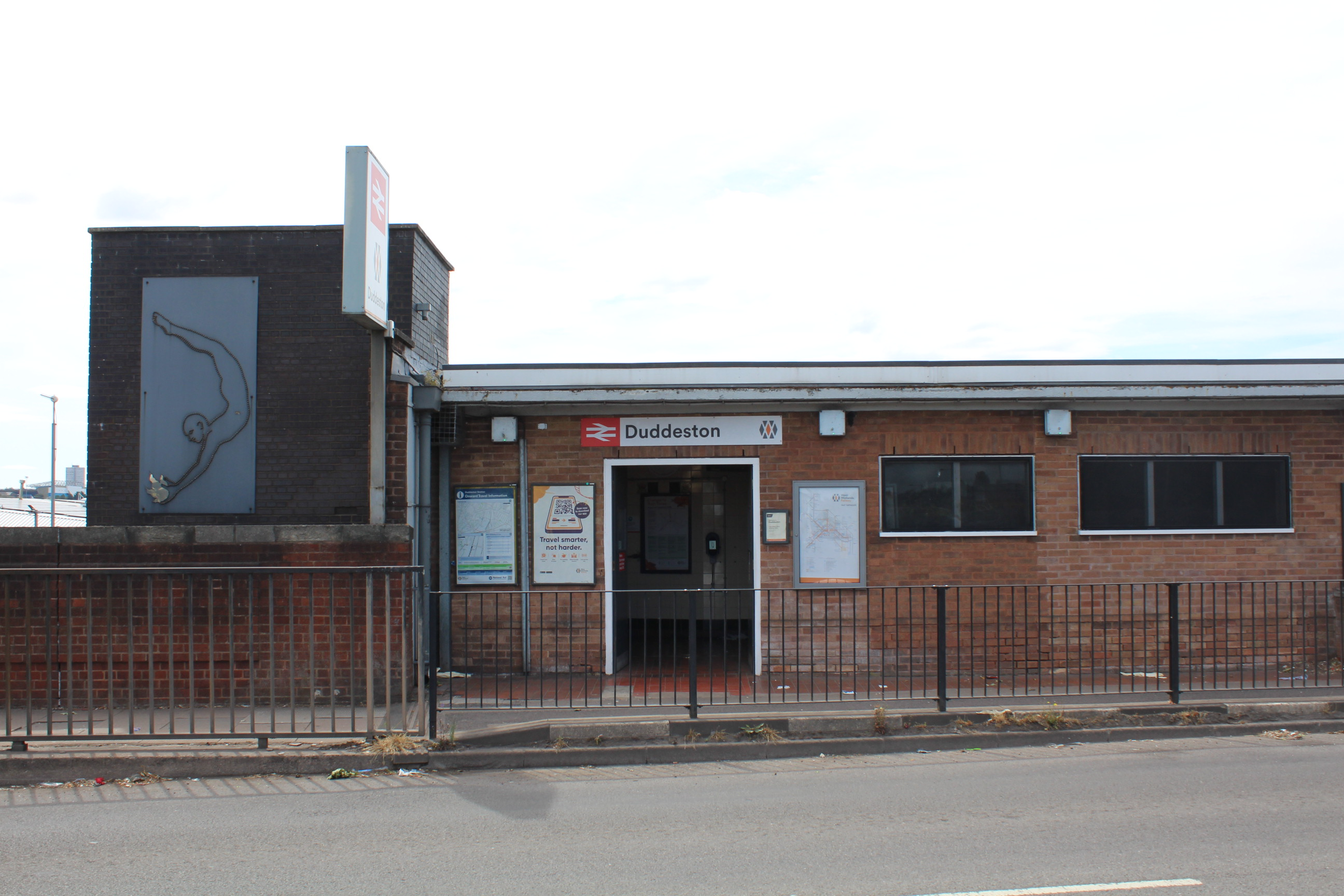
Entrance on Duddeston Mill Road in 2026

A limited number of trains continue past Walsall to Rugeley Trent Valley, usually 2 trains per day on weekdays.

=== Sundays ===
- 2 tph northbound to Lichfield Trent Valley, calling at all stations.
- 2 tph southbound to Redditch, calling at all stations.
- 1 tph to Walsall, calling at all stations.
- 1 tph to Wolverhampton, calling at all stations.

The average journey time to Birmingham New Street is around 5 minutes.

Preceding station	National Rail	Following station
Aston	West Midlands Railway; Lichfield – Four Oaks – Birmingham – Bromsgrove/Redditch; Cross-City Line	Birmingham New Street
Aston	West Midlands Railway; Rugeley – Walsall – Birmingham – Wolverhampton; Chase Line	Birmingham New Street
