= List of railway stations in the West Midlands =

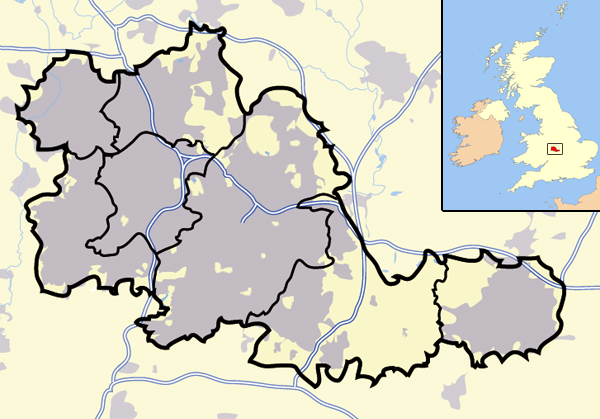
Map of the West Midlands

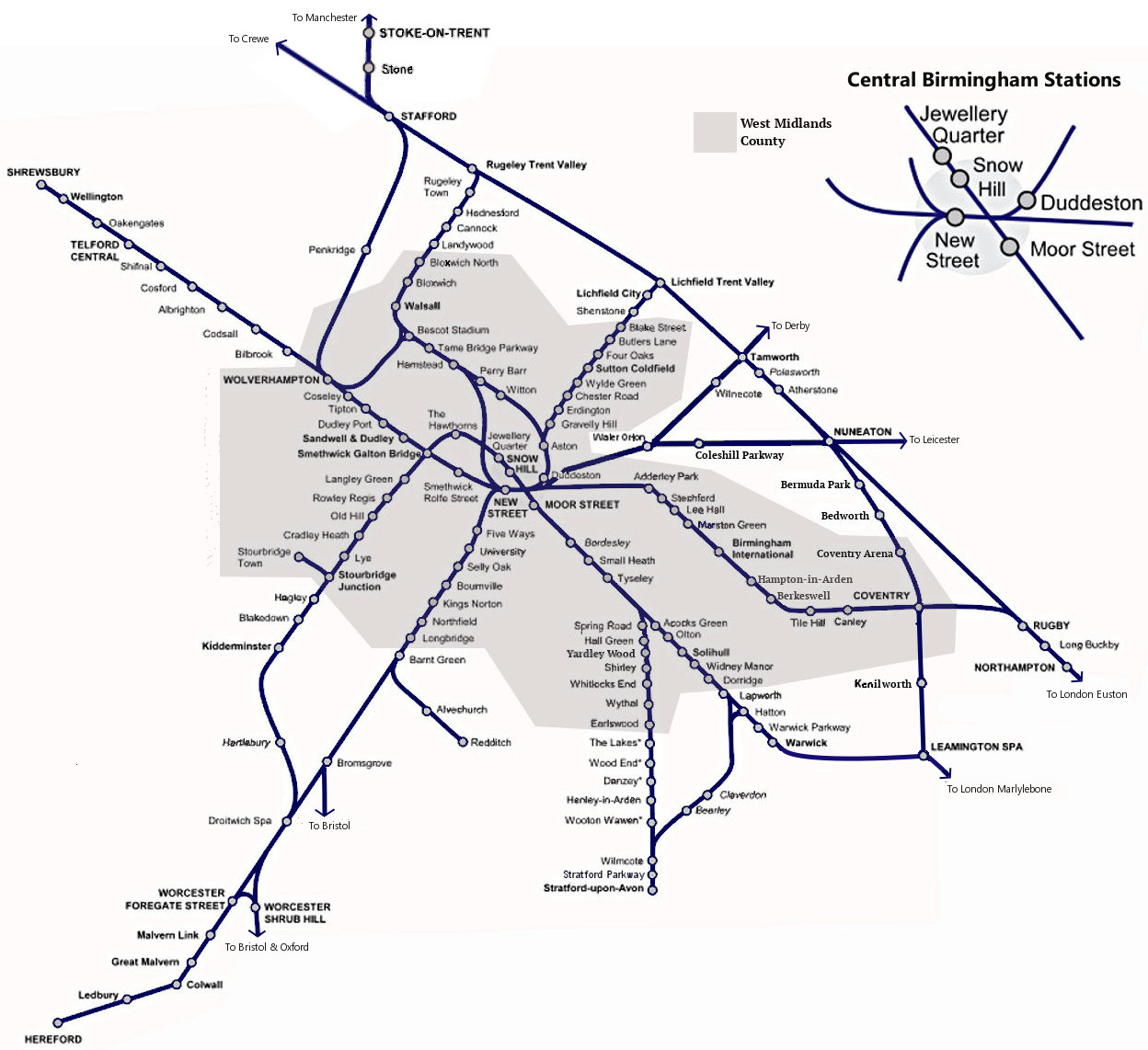
Map of passenger railways in the West Midlands

This is a list of railway stations within the West Midlands, a metropolitan county in central England which includes the cities of Birmingham, Coventry and Wolverhampton. It includes all railway stations in the West Midlands that currently have regular timetabled train services, as well as certain stations outside the county which are within the area supported by Transport for West Midlands (TfWM),^{[a]} formerly known as Centro.^{[b]} Transport within the West Midlands is subsidised by TfWM, who since 2006 have used the brand name Network West Midlands to demonstrate the 'joined-up' nature of the regions bus and rail networks.

The West Midlands rail network is divided into five zones, centred on Birmingham city centre. This is mainly for the purpose of defining season ticket boundaries. For example, a ticket valid in zones 1 and 2 can be used for travel between any station in those zones, but cannot be used to travel to zone 3 or beyond. The outside boundary is formed by the railway stations at Wolverhampton, Bloxwich North, Blake Street, Coventry, Dorridge, Earlswood, Longbridge, Stourbridge Junction and Stourbridge Town, inclusively.

== Stations ==
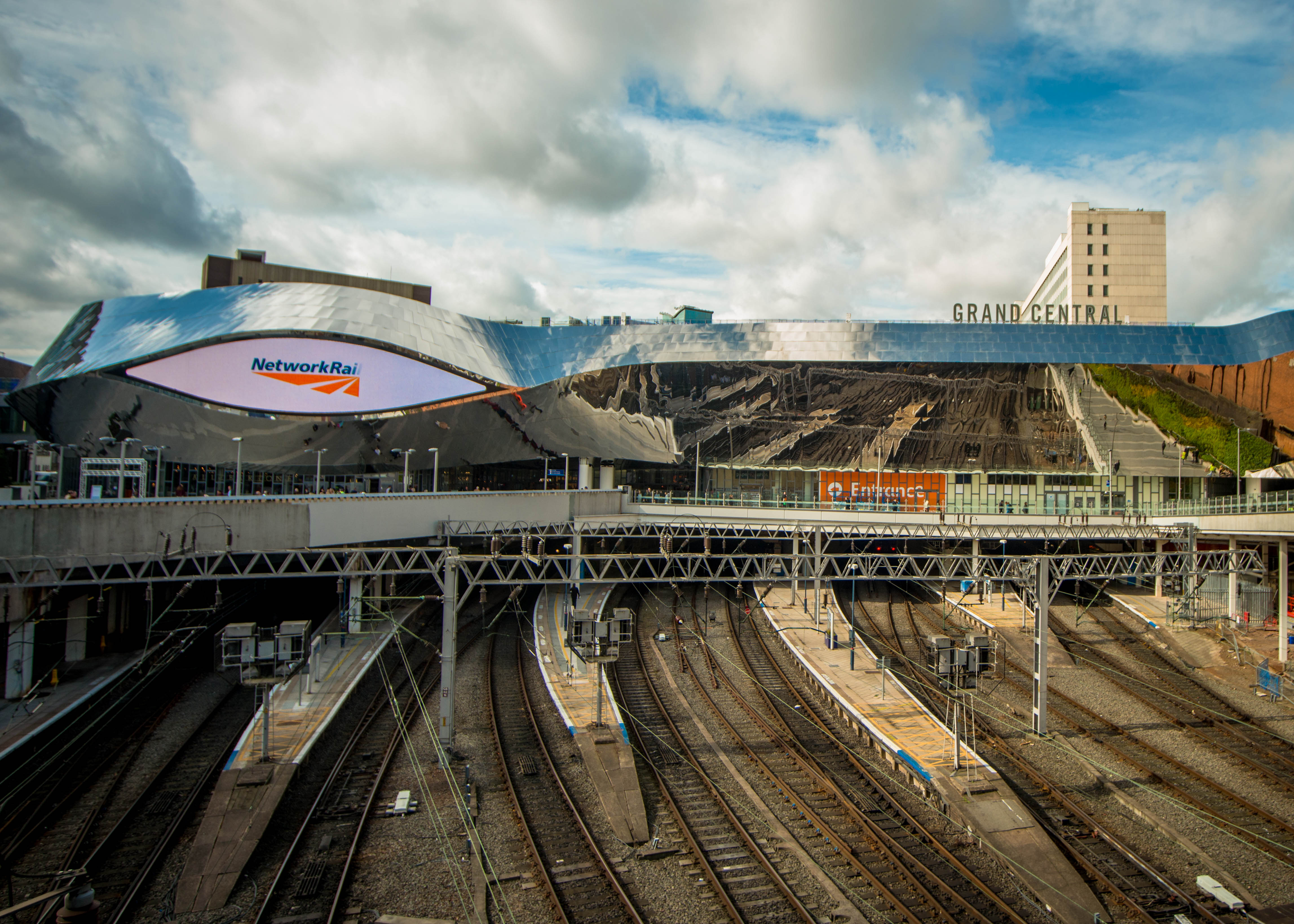
Birmingham New Street lies at the hub of the West Midland rail network.

The following table lists the name of each station, along with the year it first opened, the metropolitan district in which the station lies, and the zone in which it is situated. West Midlands Metro tram stops are not listed, except for locations which have an interchange with rail services. The table also shows the train operating companies who currently serve each station, and the final three columns give information on the number of passengers using each station in recent years, as collated by the Office of Rail and Road, a government body. The figures are based on ticket sales.

Station	Year opened	Metropolitan borough^{[c]}	Zone	DfT category	Served by	Station users 2021-22	Station users 2022-23	Station users 2023-24
Acocks Green	1852	Birmingham	3	E	West Midlands Trains	0.272 million	0.305 million	0.372 million
Adderley Park	1860	Birmingham	2	E	West Midlands Trains	74,256	0.120 million	0.138 million
Aston	1854	Birmingham	2	E	West Midlands Trains	0.388 million	0.555 million	0.632 million
Berkswell	1884	Solihull	5	E	West Midlands Trains	0.162 million	0.222 million	0.255 million
Bescot Stadium	1847	Walsall	4	E	West Midlands Trains	90,164	0.134 million	0.150 million
Birmingham International	1976	Solihull	5	B	Avanti West Coast; CrossCountry; Transport for Wales; West Midlands Trains	2.411 million	4.185 million	4.680 million
Birmingham Moor Street	1909	Birmingham	1	B	Chiltern Railways; West Midlands Trains	4.384 million	5.526 million	6.417 million
Birmingham New Street	1851	Birmingham	1	A	Avanti West Coast; CrossCountry; Transport for Wales; West Midlands Metro; West Midlands Trains	22.683 million	30.726 million	33.335 million
Birmingham Snow Hill	1852^{[d]}	Birmingham	1	C1	Chiltern Railways; West Midlands Metro; West Midlands Trains	2.311 million	2.718 million	2.851 million
Blake Street	1884	Birmingham	5	E	West Midlands Trains	0.199 million	0.264 million	0.307 million
Bloxwich	1989	Walsall	5	F2	West Midlands Trains	60,324	75,046	0.102 million
Bloxwich North	1990	Walsall	5	F2	West Midlands Trains	59,526	77,770	0.108 million
Bordesley	1855	Birmingham	2	F2	West Midlands Trains	10,038	9,088	15,116
Bournville	1876	Birmingham	3	D	West Midlands Trains	0.511 million	0.702 million	0.862 million
Butlers Lane	1957	Birmingham	5	E	West Midlands Trains	0.116 million	0.142 million	0.168 million
Canley	1940	Coventry	5	E	West Midlands Trains	0.258 million	0.364 million	0.430 million
Chester Road	1863	Birmingham	3	E	West Midlands Trains	0.390 million	0.489 million	0.593 million
Coseley	1852^{[e]}	Dudley	5	E	West Midlands Trains	0.374 million	0.516 million	0.483 million
Coventry	1838	Coventry	5	B	Avanti West Coast; CrossCountry; West Midlands Trains	4.636 million	5.977 million	6.471 million
Coventry Arena	2016	Coventry	5	F2	West Midlands Trains	68,134	0.108 million	0.109 million
Cradley Heath	1863	Sandwell	5	E	Chiltern Railways; West Midlands Trains	0.468 million	0.539 million	0.627 million
Darlaston	2026	Walsall	5	n/a	West Midlands Trains			
Dorridge	1852	Solihull	5	E	Chiltern Railways; West Midlands Trains	0.465 million	0.575 million	0.668 million
Duddeston	1837	Birmingham	2	E	West Midlands Trains	0.242 million	0.385 million	0.382 million
Dudley Port	1852^{[f]}	Sandwell	4	E	West Midlands Trains	0.247 million	0.316 million	0.358 million
Earlswood^{[a]}	1908	Solihull	5	F2	West Midlands Trains	22,246	24,804	27,844
Erdington	1862	Birmingham	3	E	West Midlands Trains	0.329 million	0.397 million	0.455 million
Five Ways	1885^{[g]}	Birmingham	1	D	West Midlands Trains	1.171 million	1.459 million	1.385 million
Four Oaks	1884	Birmingham	5	E	West Midlands Trains	0.377 million	0.498 million	0.606 million
Gravelly Hill	1862	Birmingham	2	E	West Midlands Trains	0.279 million	0.357 million	0.384 million
Hall Green	1908	Birmingham	3	E	West Midlands Trains	0.218 million	0.262 million	0.302 million
Hampton-in-Arden	1837^{[h]}	Solihull	5	E	West Midlands Trains	93,660	0.131 million	0.176 million
Hamstead	1862	Birmingham	3	E	West Midlands Trains	0.150 million	0.178 million	0.214 million
Jewellery Quarter	1995	Birmingham	1	E	Chiltern Railways; West Midlands Metro; West Midlands Trains	0.284 million	0.321 million	0.399 million
Kings Heath	2026^{[o]}	Birmingham	3	n/a	West Midlands Trains			
Kings Norton	1849	Birmingham	3	D	West Midlands Trains	0.537 million	0.676 million	0.835 million
Langley Green	1885	Sandwell	3	E	Chiltern Railways; West Midlands Trains	0.108 million	0.121 million	0.151 million
Lea Hall	1939	Birmingham	3	E	West Midlands Trains	0.260 million	0.338 million	0.410 million
Longbridge	1978^{[i]}	Birmingham	4	E	West Midlands Trains	0.525 million	0.686 million	0.817 million
Lye	1863	Dudley	5	E	Chiltern Railways; West Midlands Trains	49,792	62,188	73,912
Marston Green	1844	Solihull	4	E	West Midlands Trains	0.444 million	0.576 million	0.568 million
Moseley Village	2026^{[p]}	Birmingham	3	n/a	West Midlands Trains			
Northfield	1870	Birmingham	4	E	West Midlands Trains	0.392 million	0.489 million	0.576 million
Old Hill	1866	Sandwell	4	E	Chiltern Railways; West Midlands Trains	97,864	0.108 million	0.135 million
Olton	1869	Solihull	4	E	Chiltern Railways; West Midlands Trains	0.285 million	0.343 million	0.396 million
Perry Barr	1837	Birmingham	2	E	West Midlands Trains	30,362	0.139 million	0.176 million
Pineapple Road	2026^{[q]}	Birmingham	3	n/a	West Midlands Trains			
Rowley Regis	1867	Sandwell	3	E	Chiltern Railways; West Midlands Trains	0.649 million	0.763 million	0.886 million
Sandwell & Dudley	1852	Sandwell	4	D	Avanti West Coast; Transport for Wales; West Midlands Trains	0.605 million	0.807 million	0.878 million
Selly Oak	1876	Birmingham	2	D	West Midlands Trains	1.590 million	1.995 million	2.187 million
Shirley	1908	Solihull	4	E	West Midlands Trains	0.210 million	0.247 million	0.280 million
Small Heath	1863	Birmingham	2	E	West Midlands Trains	0.121 million	0.144 million	0.195 million
Smethwick Galton Bridge	1995	Sandwell	2	E	Chiltern Railways; West Midlands Trains	0.500 million	0.660 million	0.705 million
Smethwick Rolfe Street	1852	Sandwell	2	E	West Midlands Trains	0.292 million	0.402 million	0.393 million
Solihull	1852	Solihull	4	D	Chiltern Railways; West Midlands Trains	1.038 million	1.341 million	1.581 million
Spring Road	1908	Birmingham	3	E	West Midlands Trains	0.107 million	0.121 million	0.139 million
Stechford	1844	Birmingham	3	E	West Midlands Trains	0.234 million	0.314 million	0.377 million
Stourbridge Junction	1852	Dudley	5	D	Chiltern Railways; West Midlands Trains	0.900 million	1.093 million	1.262 million
Stourbridge Town	1879^{[j]}	Dudley	5	E	West Midlands Trains	0.264 million	0.295 million	0.346 million
Sutton Coldfield	1862^{[k]}	Birmingham	4	D	West Midlands Trains	0.645 million	0.805 million	0.937 million
Tame Bridge Parkway	1990	Sandwell	4	E	West Midlands Trains	0.353 million	0.505 million	0.580 million
The Hawthorns	1931^{[l]}	Sandwell	2	E	Chiltern Railways; West Midlands Metro; West Midlands Trains	0.225 million	0.266 million	0.284 million
Tile Hill	1864	Coventry	5	E	West Midlands Trains	0.326 million	0.428 million	0.483 million
Tipton	1852	Sandwell	5	E	West Midlands Trains	0.220 million	0.297 million	0.329 million
Tyseley	1906	Birmingham	2	E	Chiltern Railways; West Midlands Trains	0.124 million	0.148 million	0.198 million
University	1978	Birmingham	2	D	CrossCountry; West Midlands Trains	1.961 million	2.633 million	3.051 million
Walsall	1849^{[m]}	Walsall	4	D	West Midlands Trains	0.804 million	0.971 million	1.148 million
Whitlocks End	1936	Solihull	4	F2	West Midlands Trains	0.118 million	0.147 million	0.181 million
Widney Manor	1899	Solihull	4	E	Chiltern Railways; West Midlands Trains	0.177 million	0.241 million	0.286 million
Willenhall	2026	Walsall	5	n/a	West Midlands Trains			
Witton	1876	Birmingham	2	E	West Midlands Trains	0.169 million	0.191 million	0.309 million
Wolverhampton	1852^{[n]}	Wolverhampton	5	B	Avanti West Coast; CrossCountry; Transport for Wales; West Midlands Metro; West Midlands Trains	3.453 million	4.446 million	4.771 million
Wylde Green	1862	Birmingham	4	E	West Midlands Trains	0.302 million	0.389 million	0.474 million
Wythall^{[a]}	1908	Bromsgrove	5	E	West Midlands Trains	46,348	51,570	58,554
Yardley Wood	1908	Birmingham	3	E	West Midlands Trains	0.255 million	0.302 million	0.352 million

== See also ==
- List of closed railway stations in the West Midlands
- List of railway stations in Merseyside
- List of railway stations in Manchester
- List of railway stations in Wales
- List of railway stations in Worcestershire
- List of closed railway stations in Britain
- List of closed railway stations in London
- List of London Underground stations
- List of London railway stations

== Footnotes ==
^{a} Wythall is in Worcestershire, and Earlswood lies on the border between the West Midlands and Warwickshire, however they are within zone 5 of the Network West Midlands area.
^{b} Transport for West Midlands (TfWM) is the operating arm of the West Midlands Passenger Transport Authority (WMPTA) which sets policies and budgets for the executive. The WMPTA is a political body, made up of a number of councillors appointed from the seven West Midlands metropolitan borough councils.
^{c}

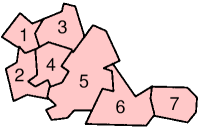
Numbered map of the seven metropolitan district councils 1: Wolverhampton 2: Dudley 3: Walsall 4: Sandwell 5: Birmingham 6: Solihull 7: Coventry

^{d} Birmingham Snow Hill was closed to passengers from 1972 to 1987.
^{e} Coseley was closed in 1902, and rebuilt approximately 400 metres away from its original site.
^{f} Two years previously, in 1850, a station was built nearby by the South Staffordshire line. When the Shrewsbury and Birmingham Railway built their station, they became known as Dudley Port Low Level, and Dudley Port High Level respectively. When the earlier station was closed to passengers in 1964, the High Level suffix was dropped from the surviving station.
^{g} Five Ways was closed to passengers from 1944 to 1978.
^{h} Hampton-in-Arden was closed in 1884, and rebuilt approximately 400 metres away from its original site.
^{i} The present Longbridge is the second station to bear the name – the original stood some distance away on the now-closed branch to Halesowen from 1915 to 1964.
^{j} Stourbridge Town was closed to passengers from 1915 to 1919.
^{k} Built by the London & North Western Railway, the station is the only survivor of the three stations that once served the town. Both Sutton Town and Sutton Park stations were opened in 1879 by the Midland Railway, and closed in 1924 and 1965 respectively.
^{l} The Hawthorns was closed to passengers from 1968 to 1995.
^{m} Two years earlier, in 1847, a temporary station had been built at Bridgeman Place.
^{n} In 1854 a second station was opened at Wolverhampton by the Great Western Railway. This became known as Wolverhampton Low Level, whilst the earlier London & North Western Railway station became known as Wolverhampton High Level. Wolverhampton Low Level was closed to passengers in 1972 and fully in 1981. The High Level station (now known as just Wolverhampton) remains open.
^{o} Kings Heath station was first opened in 1840, before being closed to passengers in 1941
^{p} Moseley station was first opened in 1867 as Moseley Station, before being closed in 1941
^{q} Pineapple Road was first opened in 1903 as Hazelwell, before being closed in 1941
