= Galton Village =

Residential area of Smethwick, West Midlands, England

Coordinates: 52.5037°N 1.9875°W

Galton Village is a residential area of Smethwick, West Midlands, England. It takes its name from the iconic Galton Bridge that was named after local businessman Samuel Galton. The Birmingham Canal Navigations main line to Wolverhampton borders the north of Galton Village, as does the Stour Valley section of the West Coast Mainline. The Oldbury Road A457 runs through the area, which begins next to Smethwick’s Galton Bridge railway station and ends at Spon Lane, at a small shopping centre.

== History ==
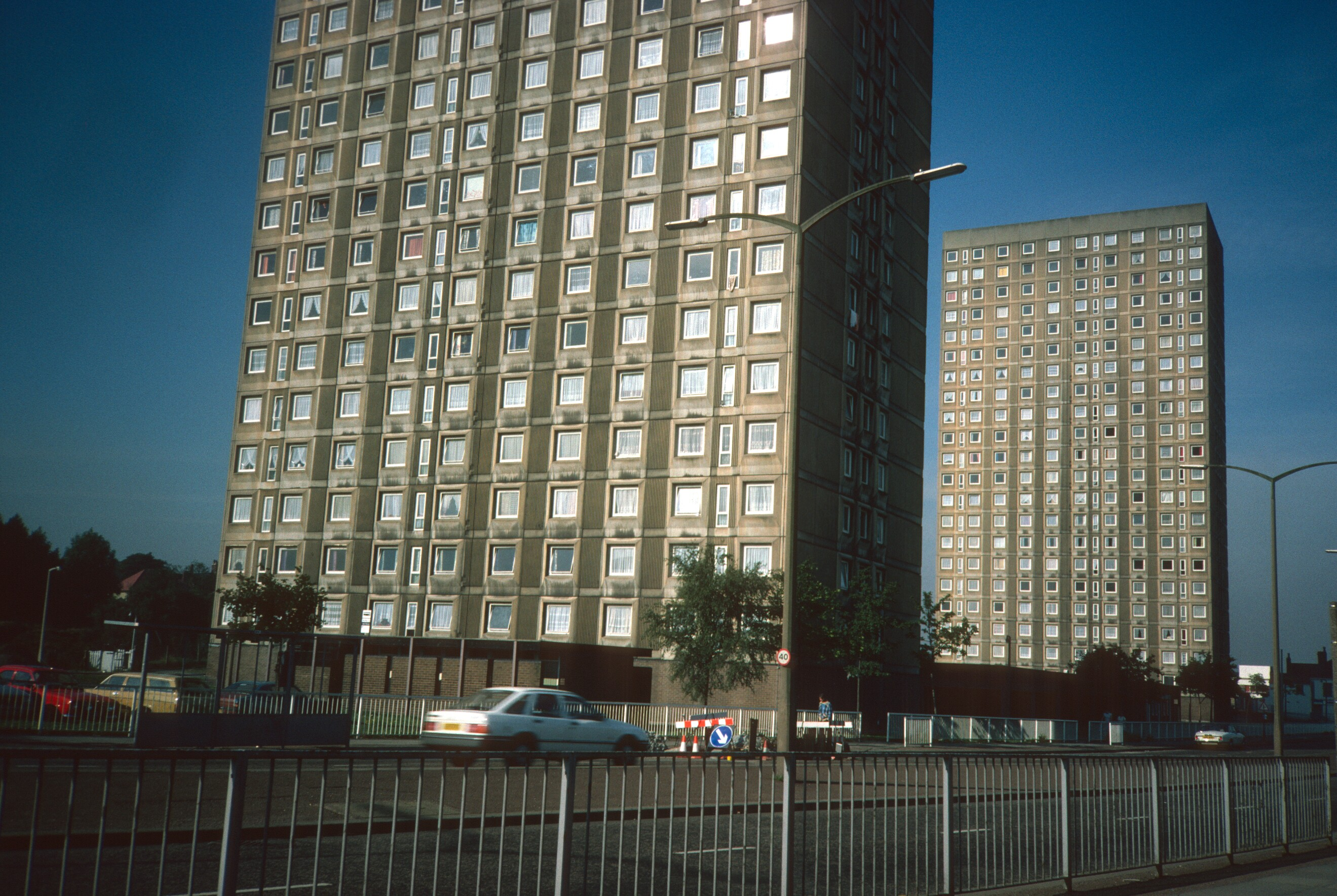
Malthouse Point and Sandfield Point, Oldbury Road, West Smethwick 1984

=== West Smethwick estate ===
The site was redeveloped in the late 1960s into a council housing estate known as the West Smethwick estate. A model of the scheme as planned by Smethwick council showed six tower blocks of flats; three each of 16-storeys and 21-storeys, plus ten blocks of maisonettes. Warley County Borough, which assumed responsibility for planning and development from 1 April 1966 reduced the number of high rise towers to two; the 21-storey Malthouse Point and Sandfield Point, constructed in 1967. The first completed building was an Elim Pentecostal Church to replace one which had stood on Birmingham Road for 90 years. The maisonettes in the initial plan were replaced by three-storey town houses. Both the flats and houses were constructed from concrete, which earned the estate the nickname "Concrete Jungle". The first of the 597 town houses on the 22-acre (8.9 ha) site was handed over to a family from Bearwood in November 1968. All the town houses had a garden or verandah and most had a carport. At the time of its completion, a borough councillor criticised the development for being too dense and predicted it would become a slum in the near future. Lead contractor was Maxim Construction Ltd and the estate was designed by Miall Rhys-Davies and Partners in association with the Warley borough architect.

In 1970–71 a shopping precinct, library, office block and a replacement for a demolished Congregational Church were built on Mallin Street, across the newly dualled Oldbury Road opposite the estate. By the 1980s, many of the flats were empty or in disrepair, and the estate was blighted by unemployment and crime. At the beginning of the 1990s, Sandwell MBC decided to demolish the estate. Between 1992 and 1997, the estate was completely redeveloped. The swathe of concrete buildings was cleared to make way for modern low-rise housing. The West Smethwick Estate title was abandoned in favour of Galton Village.

Just to the south of Galton Village is West Smethwick and its park; the area sits on the border with West Bromwich to the north and Oldbury to the west.

It is not to be confused with the Galton council estate in neighbouring Oldbury, which was developed during the 1920s and 1930s.

== Transport links ==
Smethwick Galton Bridge railway station opened in 1995 and replaced the nearby Smethwick West railway station. Trains run to Wolverhampton – Birmingham New Street and Kidderminster – Birmingham Snow Hill. Spon Lane station on the Stour Valley Line was closed in 1960 having served the area since 1852. Ordnance Survey maps show the children's play area at the entrance to the estate off Spon Lane was the site of railway sidings and goods sheds prior to the 1960s redevelopment.

Bus route no. 80 from West Bromwich and 87 from Dudley stop on Oldbury Road and link Galton Village to Birmingham city centre. Services from West Bromwich stop on Mallin Street and Spon Lane South; no. 48 for Queen Elizabeth Hospital, 49 for Bearwood, and 54 to Worlds End.

The corner of Spon Lane South (A4031) and Oldbury Road (A457) where now stands the Durga Bhawan Hindu Cultural Resource Centre, was formerly the site of The Spon Croft public house built by Mitchells & Butlers in the 1930s, and demolished in 1999. It replaced a smaller tavern of that name on the opposite corner.

== Schools ==
George Betts Primary on West End Avenue attained academy status in 2013. Originally named George Betts Junior School, it was formally opened in 1954 by Betts, a former chairman of Smethwick Education Committee. It was extended to accommodate infants in 1970. In 1959 and 1960, a former teacher who had moved to Henderson Avenue School in Scunthorpe arranged reciprocal visits between the two schools.

Holly Lodge High School is the nearest senior school.

== Governance ==
Galton Village is within St Pauls Ward for elections to Sandwell Borough council.
