= Albion railway station (England) =

Disused railway station in Oldbury, West Midlands

Albion

General information
- Location: Oldbury, Sandwell; England
- Coordinates: 52.5169°N 2.0245°W
- Grid reference: SO984910
- Platforms: 2

Other information
- Status: Disused

History
- Pre-grouping: London and North Western Railway
- Post-grouping: London, Midland and Scottish Railway

Key dates
- 1 July 1852: Station opened
- 1 February 1960: Station closed
Location

Albion railway station was a railway station in England, built by the London and North Western Railway on their Stour Valley Line in 1852. It served the town of Oldbury, and was located near to Union Road.

== History ==
Opened by the Birmingham, Wolverhampton and Stour Valley Railway, then absorbed into the London and North Western Railway, it became part of the London, Midland and Scottish Railway during the Grouping of 1923. The line then passed on to the London Midland Region of British Railways on nationalisation in 1948. The station was then closed by the British Transport Commission.

== The site today ==
The station closed in 1960, although the Rugby-Birmingham-Stafford Line loop from the West Coast Main Line still runs through the site of the station today.

There is little evidence of the location of the station on the ground today; Oldbury is now served by Sandwell and Dudley railway station.

| Preceding station | Disused railways | Following station |
|---|---|---|
| Dudley Port | London and North Western Railway; Stour Valley Line | Oldbury |
