= Spon Lane railway station =

Former railway station in England

Spon Lane

General information
- Location: Smethwick and West Bromwich, Sandwell; England
- Coordinates: 52.5053°N 1.9928°W
- Grid reference: SP005897
- Platforms: 2

Other information
- Status: Disused

History
- Pre-grouping: London and North Western Railway
- Post-grouping: London, Midland and Scottish Railway

Key dates
- 1852: Opened
- 15 June 1964: Closed
Location

Spon Lane railway station was a railway station in England, built by the London and North Western Railway on their Stour Valley Line in 1852. It served the towns of Smethwick and West Bromwich.

The station closed in 1964, although the Rugby-Birmingham-Stafford line/Birmingham Loop from the West Coast Main Line still runs through the site of the station today.

There is little evidence of the location of the station on the ground today, and Smethwick Galton Bridge, which opened in 1995 a short distance to the east, now serves the area.

| Preceding station | Disused railways | Following station |
|---|---|---|
| Oldbury | London and North Western Railway; Stour Valley Line | Smethwick Rolfe Street |
