= Ettingshall Road railway station =

Former railway station in England

Ettingshall Road

General information
- Location: Ettingshall, Wolverhampton; England
- Coordinates: 52.5666°N 2.1029°W
- Grid reference: SO931966
- Platforms: 2

Other information
- Status: Disused

History
- Original company: London and North Western Railway
- Pre-grouping: London and North Western Railway
- Post-grouping: London, Midland and Scottish Railway

Key dates
- 1852: Opened
- 15 June 1964: Closed
Location

Ettingshall Road railway station was a railway station built by the London and North Western Railway on their Stour Valley Line in 1852. It served the Ettingshall area of Wolverhampton, and the nearby market town of Bilston. The station was located near to the junction of Ettingshall Road and Parkfield Road.

== Other names ==
It was sometimes known as Ettingshall Road and Bilston.

== Closure and present day ==
The station closed in 1964, although the Rugby-Birmingham-Stafford Line loop from the West Coast Main Line still runs through the site of the station.

Preceding station	Disused railways	Following station
Monmore Green	London and North Western Railway; Stour Valley Line	Coseley
