= CSY =

CSY may refer to:

- CSY is the ICAO airline designator for Shuangyang General Aviation Company, China
- CSY is the IATA airport code for Cheboksary Airport, Russia
- CSY is the National Rail station code for Coseley railway station, England
- Central Siberian Yupik language, one of the four Yupik languages. It is spoken also on St. Lawrence Island
- Czech language in some implementation (Microsoft, Autodesk)
