= Soho railway station =

Former railway station in England

Soho

General information
- Location: Smethwick, Sandwell; England
- Coordinates: 52.4964°N 1.9569°W
- Grid reference: SP030887
- Platforms: 2

Other information
- Status: Disused

History
- Pre-grouping: London and North Western Railway

Key dates
- 1853: Opened
- 1880s: Rebuilt
- 1949: Closed
- 1953: Demolished
Location

Soho railway station was a railway station in England, built by the London and North Western Railway on their Stour Valley Line in 1853. It served Soho in the eastern part of Smethwick, and included goods sheds and sidings.

The station was rebuilt on a new site to the west of Soho Street during the 1880s.

The station closed in 1949, although the Rugby–Birmingham–Stafford line/Birmingham loop from the West Coast Main Line still runs through the site of the station today.

There is little evidence of the location of the station on the ground today, and Smethwick Rolfe Street is only a short distance to the west.

Preceding station	Disused railways	Following station
Smethwick Rolfe Street	London and North Western Railway; Stour Valley Line	Winson Green
Smethwick Rolfe Street	London and North Western Railway; Soho Junction to Perry Barr Junction	Soho Road
