= Soho Road railway station =

Railroad station in Handsworth, England, United Kingdom

Soho Road

General information
- Location: Handsworth, Birmingham; England
- Coordinates: 52.5016°N 1.9281°W
- Grid reference: SP049892
- Platforms: 2

Other information
- Status: Disused

History
- Pre-grouping: London and North Western Railway
- Post-grouping: London, Midland and Scottish Railway

Key dates
- 1 April 1889: Opened
- 1941: Closed
Location

Soho Road railway station was a railway station in Handsworth, Birmingham, England, on the London and North Western Railway's rail link between the Chase Line and the West Coast Main Line. The station operated between 1889 and 1941.

The station never attracted many passengers, as it competed with the nearby Great Western Railway station Soho and Winson Green, which was on a more direct route to Birmingham. Like neighbouring station Handsworth Wood, it was closed as an economy measure during the Second World War, and never re-opened. The line however still operates today.

A short distance to the south-east of the station was a short spur, which led to Soho Pool goods station.

Preceding station	Disused railways	Following station
Handsworth Wood	London and North Western Railway; Soho Junction to Perry Barr Junction	Soho or Winson Green; Stour Valley Line
