= Monmore Green railway station =

Former railway station in England

Monmore Green

General information
- Location: Monmore Green, Wolverhampton; England
- Coordinates: 52.5780°N 2.1086°W
- Grid reference: SO927978
- Platforms: 2

Other information
- Status: Disused

History
- Pre-grouping: London and North Western Railway

Key dates
- 1863: Opened
- 1916: Closed
Location

Monmore Green railway station was a railway station built by the London and North Western Railway on their Stour Valley Line in 1863. It served the Monmore Green area of Wolverhampton, and was located near to the junction of Bilston Road and Landport Road.

The station closed in 1916, although the Rugby-Birmingham-Stafford Line loop from the West Coast Main Line still runs through the site of the station today. As you pass along this stretch of track, the exact position of the station is coincident with a widening of the track-side paraphernalia, most defined on the eastern track edge.

Preceding station	Disused railways	Following station
Wolverhampton High Level	London and North Western Railway; Stour Valley Line	Ettingshall Road
