= Tipton railway station =

Railway station in West Midlands, England

Coordinates: 52.530°N 2.066°W

Tipton
- Entrance on Owen Street, October 2026

General information
- Location: Tipton, Sandwell; England
- Grid reference: SO956925
- Manager: West Midlands Railway
- Transit authority: Transport for West Midlands
- Platforms: 2

Other information
- Station code: TIP
- Fare zone: 5
- Classification: DfT category E

Key dates
- 1852: Opened as Tipton Owen Street
- 1968: Renamed Tipton
- 2009: Closed for redevelopment
- 2010: Re-opened

Passengers
- 2021/22: ▲0.220 million
- 2022/23: ▲0.297 million
- 2023/24: ▲0.329 million
- 2024/25: ▲0.359 million
- 2025/26: ▲0.417 million
Location
Notes
- Passenger statistics from the Office of Rail and Road

Tipton railway station is located in the industrial town of Tipton in the borough of Sandwell, West Midlands, England and was known as Tipton Owen Street until 1968. It is situated on the Rugby-Birmingham-Stafford branch of the West Coast Main Line. The station is operated by West Midlands Railway, which also provides all services.

The station was closed from September 2009 to March 2010 for refurbishment which allowed the platforms to be extended to accommodate longer trains than previously, and to remove a level crossing at the southern end of the station on the opening of a relief road which undercuts the railway. The redevelopment also included new waiting areas, easier access to the station, increased car park size, new subway, improved security and a new bus interchange.

== Services ==
Tipton is served by West Midlands Railway services on the Stour Valley line, operated on behalf of Transport for West Midlands.

As of February 2025, it is served by:

West Midlands Railway

- 2 tph stopping services between Wolverhampton and Walsall via Birmingham New Street and Aston.

Platforms seen in 2026

Three main West Midlands Trains express services used to call here - the first was a morning peak service from New Street to Crewe which now calls on Sundays only; the second an evening peak service from Birmingham New Street to Shrewsbury; and the third was the final service from Birmingham New Street to Crewe.

Preceding station	National Rail	Following station
Dudley Port	West Midlands Railway; Wolverhampton – Birmingham – Walsall	Coseley

Preceding station	Disused railways	Following station
Coseley; Line and station open	London and North Western Railway; Princes End branch line	Princes End; Line and station closed

== Nearby attractions ==
- Black Country Living Museum
- Dudley Zoo
