= Handsworth Wood railway station =

Former railway station in England

Handsworth Wood
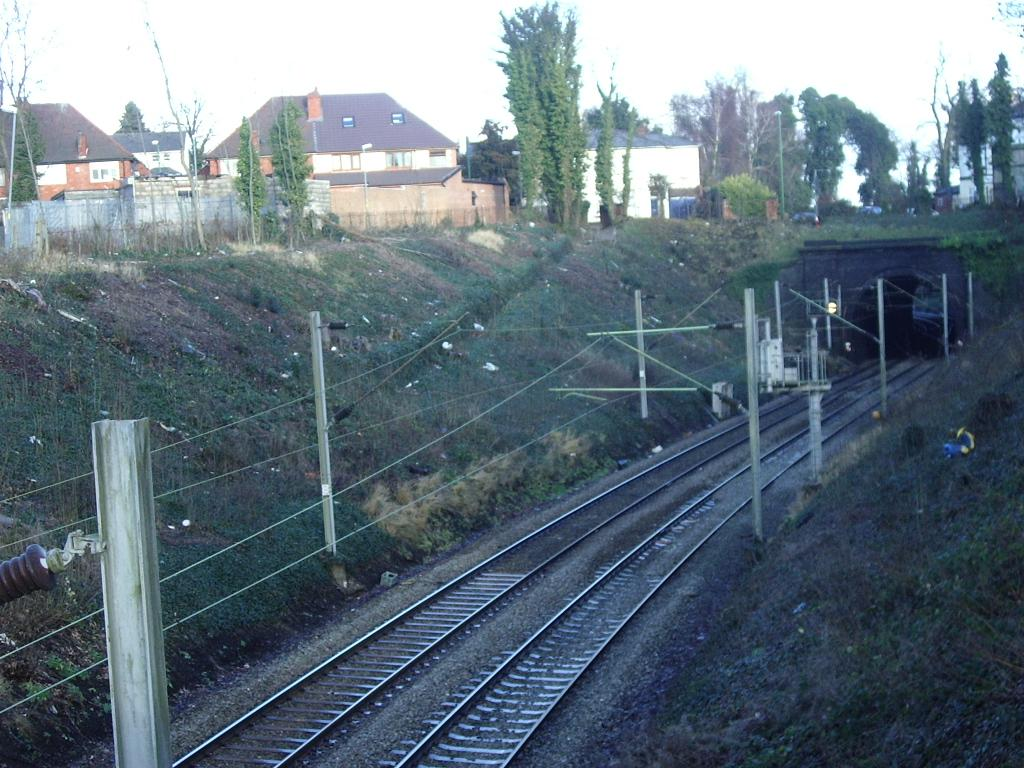
- The site in 2010

General information
- Location: Handsworth Wood, Birmingham; England
- Coordinates: 52.5120°N 1.9215°W
- Grid reference: SP053904
- Platforms: 2

Other information
- Status: Disused

History
- Pre-grouping: London and North Western Railway
- Post-grouping: London, Midland and Scottish Railway

Key dates
- 1896: Opened
- 1941: Closed
Location

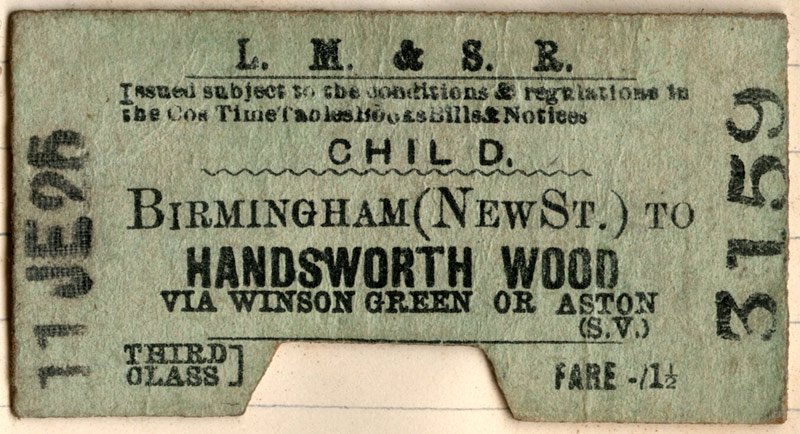
1925 LMS Birmingham to Handsworth Wood Third Class Child Railway Ticket

Handsworth Wood railway station was a railway station in Handsworth Wood, Birmingham, England. It was found on the London and North Western Railway link between the Chase Line and the West Coast Main Line. The station operated between 1896 and 1941, and like neighbouring station Soho Road, closed during the Second World War, as a result of decreasing use by passengers who possibly found the new 16 bus route more convenient.

The station site lies in a cutting through Handsworth Park, adjacent to St Mary's Church.

Preceding station	Disused railways	Following station
Soho Road	London and North Western Railway; Soho Junction to Perry Barr Junction	Hamstead or Perry Barr; Chase Line
