= Dudley Port railway station =

Railway station in the West Midlands, England

Dudley Port

General information
- Location: Dudley Port, Tipton, Sandwell; England
- Coordinates: 52.524693°N 2.049987°W
- Grid reference: SO967918
- Manager: West Midlands Railway
- Transit authority: Transport for West Midlands
- Platforms: 2

Other information
- Station code: DDP
- Fare zone: 4
- Classification: DfT category E

History
- Original company: Birmingham, Wolverhampton and Stour Valley Railway
- Pre-grouping: London and North Western Railway
- Post-grouping: London, Midland and Scottish Railway

Key dates
- 1 July 1852: Station opened as Dudley Port (High Level)
- c. 1964: Renamed Dudley Port

Passengers
- 2021/22: ▲0.247 million
- 2022/23: ▲0.316 million
- 2023/24: ▲0.358 million
- 2024/25: ▲0.376 million
- 2025/26: ▲0.435 million
Location
Notes
- Passenger statistics from the Office of Rail and Road

Dudley Port railway station serves the Dudley Port and Great Bridge areas of Tipton, West Midlands, England. Situated on the Rugby–Birmingham–Stafford branch of the West Coast Main Line, the station is operated by West Midlands Railway.

== High Level station ==
=== History ===
The station opened in 1852. Despite the name, and being located just 1.6 miles (2.6 km) north-east of the town centre of Dudley (which has not had its own railway station since 1964), Dudley Port station is not actually situated within the Borough of Dudley, but in the town of Tipton and the modern day borough of Sandwell. The name Dudley Port emerged during the 19th century, due to the many warehouses and wharves being built along the Birmingham Canal. The area initially became known as Dudley's Port, before the title Dudley Port was adopted.

Dudley Port Station was previously known as Dudley Port High Level Station, as a Low Level Station was situated on the South Staffordshire line from Dudley to Walsall, which passes beneath.

High Level was dropped from the station's name when the Low Level station closed in 1964 as a result of the Beeching Axe which saw passenger services axed along the South Staffordshire Line.

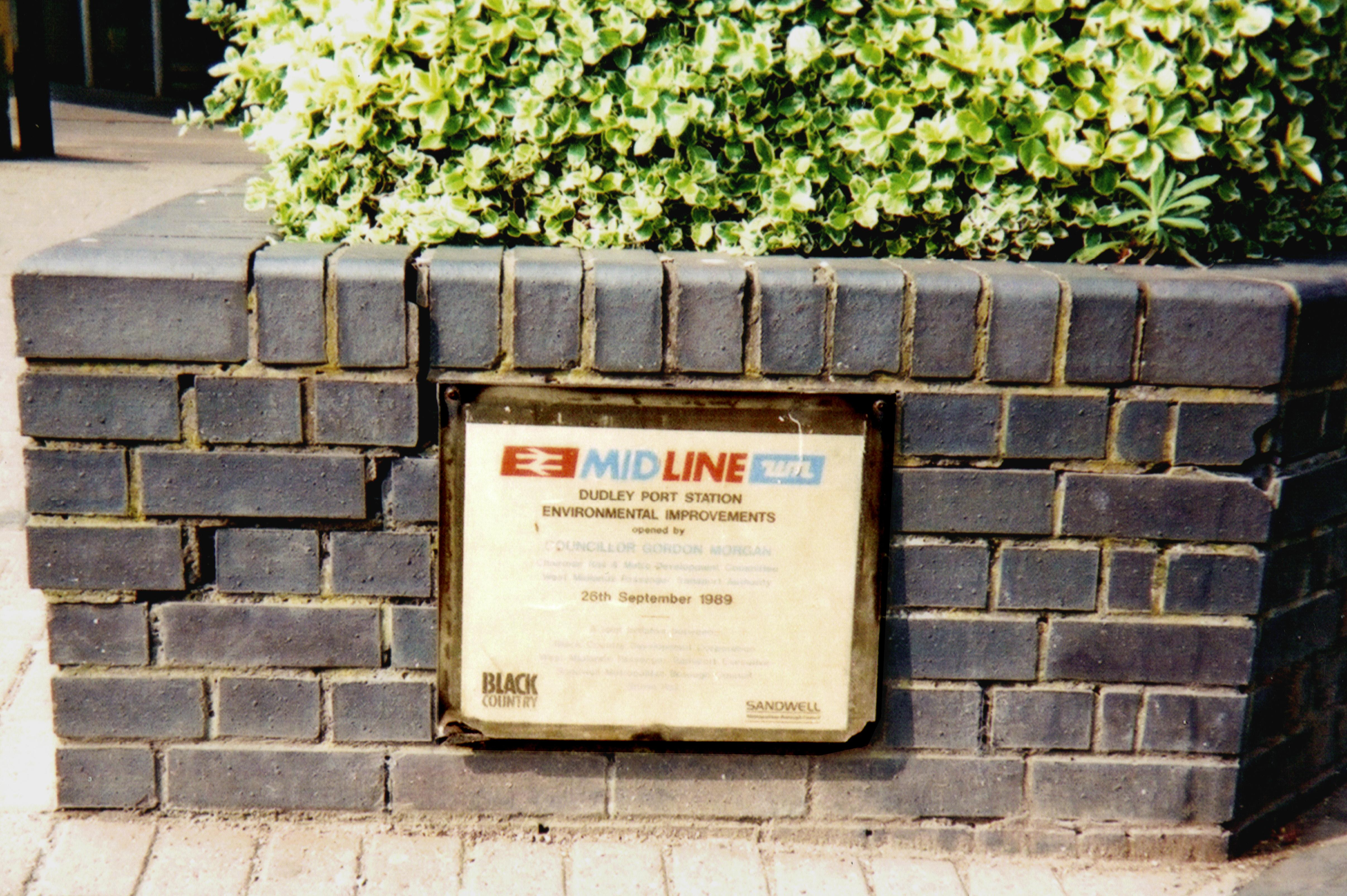
Plaque commemorating the rebuilding of Dudley Port station's upper level in 1989

The upper level was revamped in the mid-1980s and officially re-opened by former West Midlands County Council leader Gordon Morgan in 1989. The previous arrangement of one side platform, and one island platform (the bay serving the branch to Dudley Town) was demolished and the station today consists of a singular island platform situated between the running lines.

The station's facilities have been criticised by local residents and local officials alike since seating arrangements are within a bus shelter on the platform, and the ticket office is actually situated within a shipping container.

=== Today's usage ===
==== Services ====
Services are operated using Class 730 Electric multiple units. West Midlands Railway operates the following typical service pattern, in trains per hour:

Mondays to Saturdays:

- 2 trains per hour (tph) eastbound to Walsall via Birmingham New Street and Aston
- 2 tph westbound to Wolverhampton

On Sundays, there is typically one train per hour between Walsall and Wolverhampton, with some additional morning/evening peak services that start/terminate at Birmingham New Street.

West Midlands Railway Class 730 arriving at the island platform, October 2026

Previously, Dudley Port was considered the main intermediate station between Birmingham and Wolverhampton due to being formed on two levels and being the junction to Dudley Town. This status was transferred to Sandwell and Dudley & Smethwick Galton Bridge stations as Dudley Port's junction status was removed with the closure of the low-level platforms, and a large car park being built at Sandwell and Dudley, along with intercity services calling there. Smethwick Galton Bridge is now a major junction station, providing interchange between the Stour Valley line and the Birmingham to Worcester via Kidderminster line.

Three West Midlands Railway express services a day used to call at this station - the first a morning peak service from Stafford to New Street, the second an evening peak service from New Street to Shrewsbury, and the third the final service from New Street to Crewe.

Preceding station	National Rail	Following station
Sandwell & Dudley	West Midlands Railway; Rugby–Birmingham–Stafford line	Tipton
	Disused railways	
Dudley	Great Western Railway; Birmingham Snow Hill–Dudley Branch (1866–1964)	Great Bridge South
Dudley	South Staffordshire Railway; Later LNWR, then LMS, finally BR; South Staffs Line (1850–1964)	Great Bridge North

== Low Level station ==
Dudley Port (Low Level)
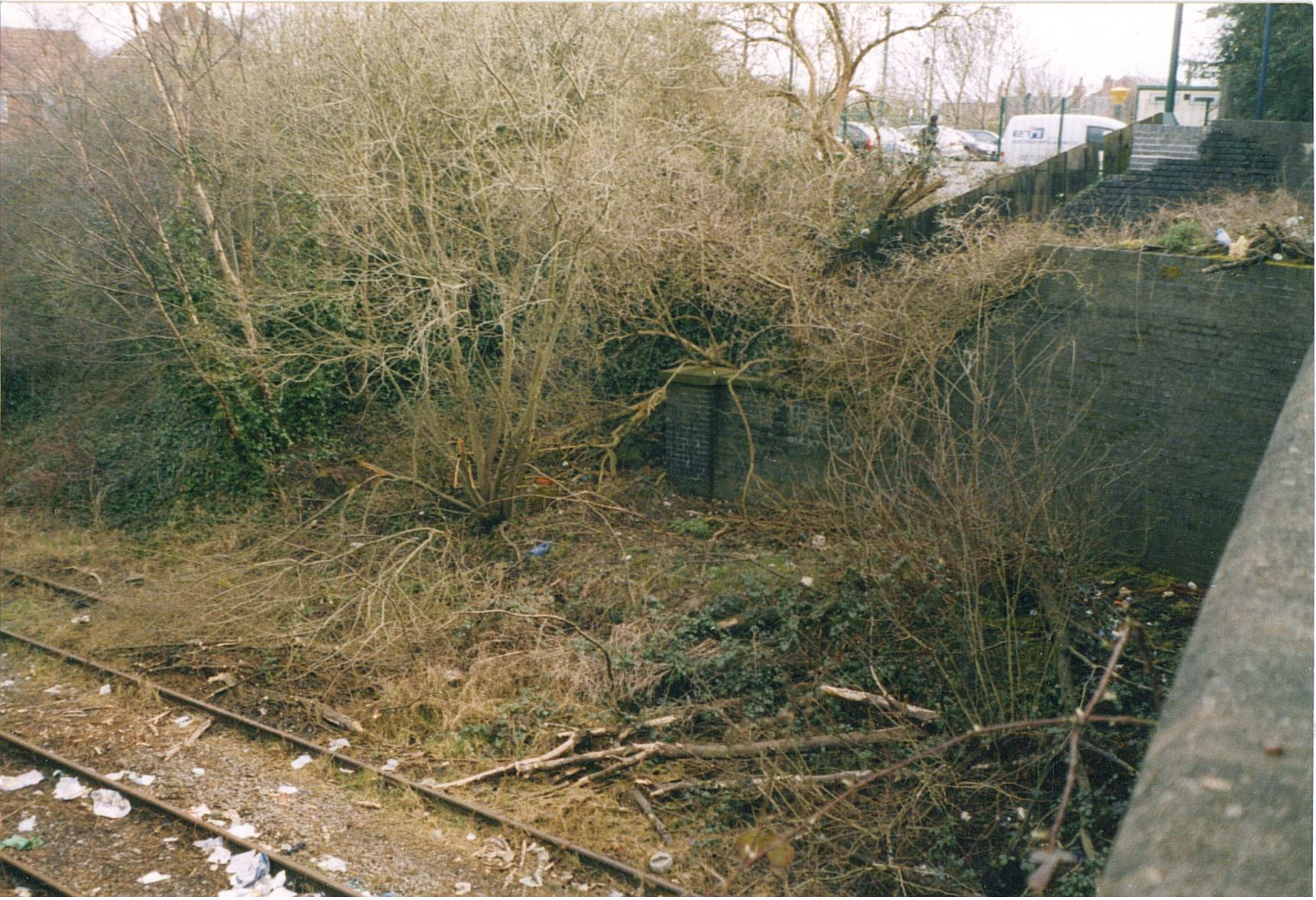
- A picture of Dudley port station's lower level in 2001. The diagonal brick structure on the right is a former stairway.

General information
- Location: Tipton, Sandwell; England
- Coordinates: 52.501°N 1.981°W
- Platforms: 2

Other information
- Status: Disused

History
- Original company: South Staffordshire Railway
- Pre-grouping: London and North Western Railway
- Post-grouping: London, Midland and Scottish Railway

Key dates
- 1 April 1850: Opened as Dudley Port railway station
- 1964: Closed
Location

=== History ===
The Low Level Station stood on the former South Staffordshire Line opened in 1850, which connected Dudley Port with Dudley railway station. The line had reasonable passenger usage until about the early 1880s, when it began to slump at several stations, leading to the line becoming a largely freight only operation in 1887. It remained open for goods traffic, which was considerable at this time, as the district had become highly industrialised in the Black Country's heyday. It closed in July 1964 as passenger services were phased out along the line due to the Beeching Axe and the blue brick station building was demolished three years later, although the railway remained open to goods trains until 1993.

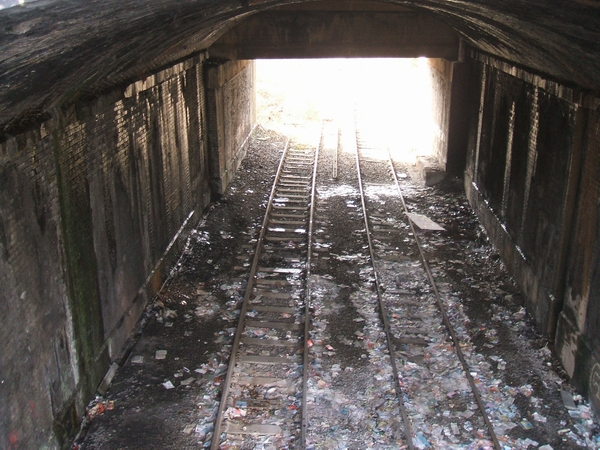
The South Staffordshire Line through Dudley Port Low Level.

Just to the north of Dudley Port Low Level was the junction for the connecting line to the GWR Snow Hill Line via Great Bridge. To the south was the junction for the short connecting line to the Stour Valley Line.

=== Services ===
The low level station would generally see local stopping services between Dudley Town and Walsall. Great Western Railway services to Birmingham Snow Hill via Great Bridge ran through, but did not stop. Services from Birmingham New Street to Dudley generally ran via the Sedgley curve and the high level platforms, however some of these services did run via Walsall and Bescot, using the low level platforms.

=== Reopening as West Midlands Metro ===
Phase Two of the West Midlands Metro will see the line reopening to carry trams between Walsall, Dudley Port Lower Level, Dudley railway station and the Merry Hill Shopping Centre. The closed section of the South Staffordshire Line through Dudley is under construction and was due to re-open in 2022–2023,. However, due to delays and cost overruns the line is expected to open as far as Dudley in late 2026. The section to Merry Hill is under construction and set to open in 2028. Funding has not yet been secured for the final section to Brierley Hill.

	Future services	
Horseley Road	West Midlands Metro	Sedgley Road
