= Smethwick Rolfe Street railway station =

Railway station in Smethwick, England

Smethwick Rolfe Street
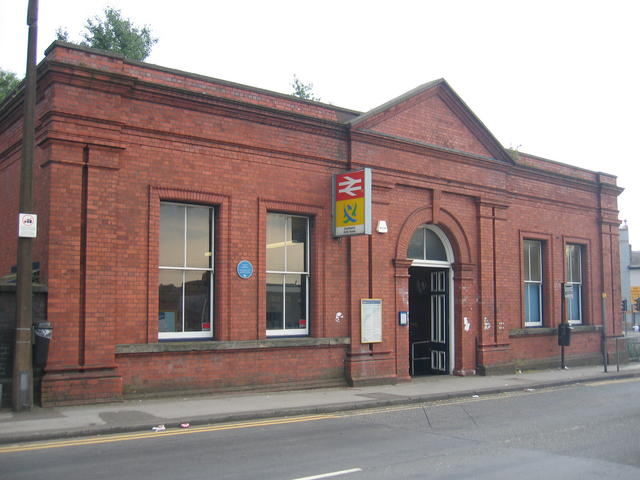

General information
- Location: Smethwick, Sandwell; England
- Coordinates: 52.496°N 1.971°W
- Grid reference: SP021887
- Manager: West Midlands Railway
- Transit authority: Transport for West Midlands
- Platforms: 2

Other information
- Station code: SMR
- Fare zone: 2
- Classification: DfT category E

History
- Original company: Birmingham, Wolverhampton & Stour Valley Railway

Key dates
- 1852: Opened
- 1890: Rebuilt

Passengers
- 2021/22: ▲0.292 million
- 2022/23: ▲0.402 million
- 2023/24: ▼0.393 million
- 2024/25: ▲0.404 million
- 2025/26: ▲0.435 million
Location
Notes
- Passenger statistics from the Office of Rail and Road

Smethwick Rolfe Street is one of two railway stations serving the town of Smethwick, West Midlands, England. It is situated on the Rugby–Birmingham–Stafford line 3¼ miles (5 km) north west of Birmingham New Street. The station, and all trains serving it, are operated by West Midlands Railway. The other station serving Smethwick is Smethwick Galton Bridge, which is the next stop up the line.

== History ==
The station was opened in July 1852 by the Birmingham, Wolverhampton, & Stour Valley Railway Company (later absorbed by London and North Western Railway) as part of the Stour Valley Line from Birmingham to Wolverhampton. It was rebuilt in its present form in 1890 when two level crossings in the centre of Smethwick were abolished.

In 1985, pupils from Parkside Junior School created a mural for Platform 1 under the direction of artist Jeremy Waygood as part of the Birmingham to Wolverhampton Corridor Initiative. In June 2017, this mural was removed and replaced by one created by students from Sandwell College under the direction of artist Steve Field, to celebrate the cultural diversity and vibrancy of Smethwick. In addition, an exhibition room was created by another set of students from the college to display the history of the station and of the murals. In October 2017 this work was recognised in the ACoRP Community Rail Awards with a 1st place for Involving Diverse Groups and a 3rd place for Community Art Schemes - Permanent.

Work began in January 2022 to install lifts to allow step-free access to the station. The project was completed later that year.

== Services ==
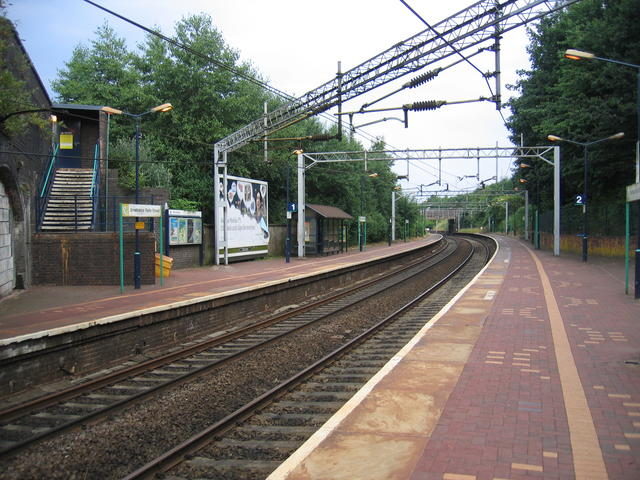
The station platforms.

The station is served by two trains per hour in each direction Mondays to Saturdays, by the local service between Wolverhampton, Birmingham New Street and Walsall via Aston. On Sundays, the service runs hourly. These are operated by Class 730 EMUs.

Preceding station	National Rail	Following station
Birmingham New Street	West Midlands Railway; Walsall/Birmingham - Wolverhampton	Smethwick Galton Bridge
	Historical railways	
Soho; Line open, station closed	London and North Western Railway & Great Western Railway	Smethwick West; Line open, station closed

== Bibliography ==
- Marshall, Geoff; Pipe, Vicki (2018). The Railway Adventures: Places, Trains, People and Stations. September Publishing. ISBN 978-1910463871.
