= Sandwell & Dudley railway station =

Railway station in the West Midlands, England

Sandwell & Dudley
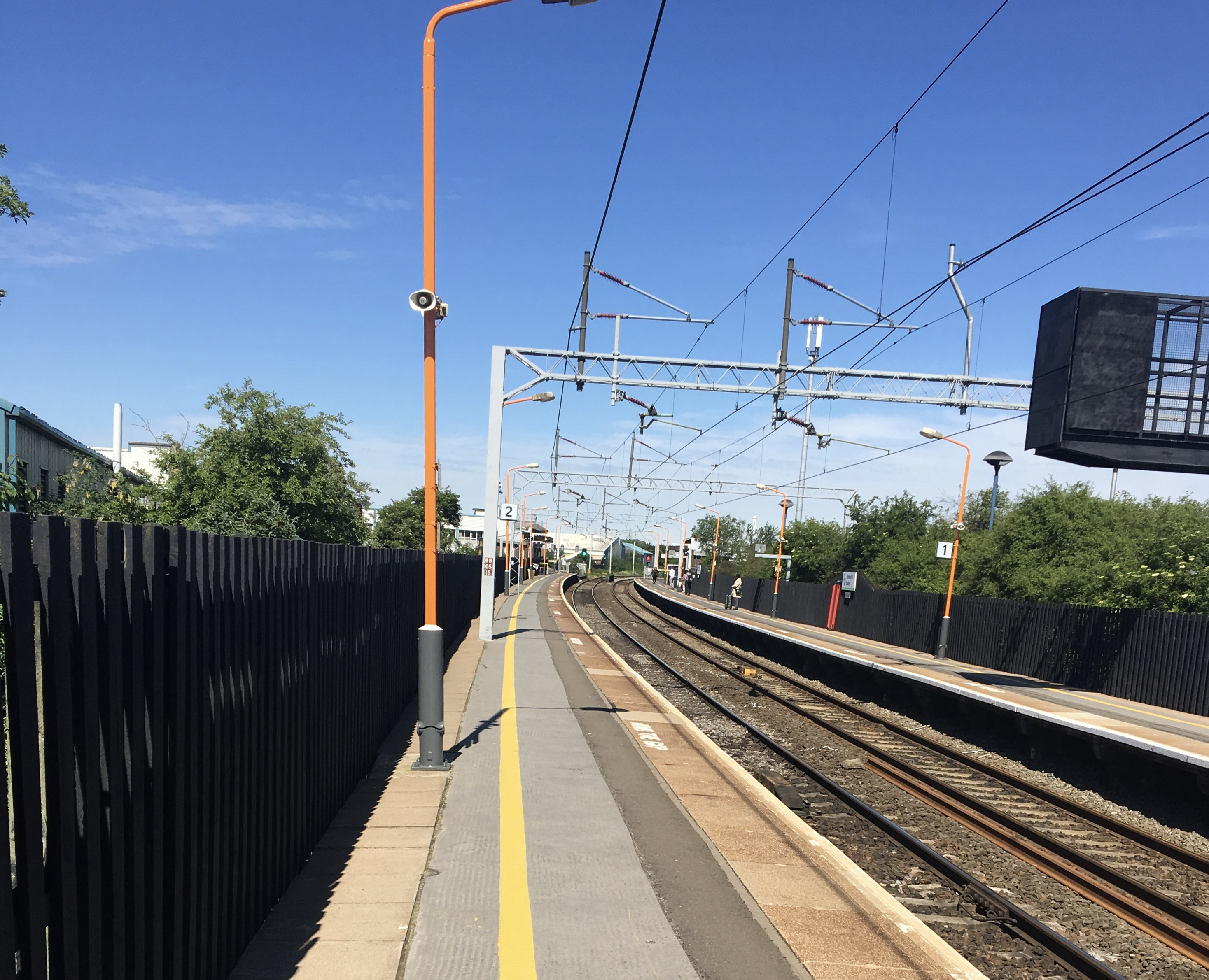

General information
- Location: Oldbury, Sandwell, England
- Coordinates: 52.508637°N 2.011776°W
- Grid reference: SO992900
- Owner: Network Rail
- Manager: West Midlands Trains
- Transit authority: Transport for West Midlands
- Platforms: 2

Other information
- Station code: SAD
- Fare zone: 4
- Classification: DfT category D

Key dates
- 1852: Opened as Oldbury
- 1984: Rebuilt and renamed Sandwell & Dudley

Passengers
- 2021/22: ▲0.605 million
- 2022/23: ▲0.807 million
- 2023/24: ▲0.878 million
- 2024/25: ▲1.006 million
- 2025/26: ▲1.160 million
Location
Notes
- Passenger statistics from the Office of Rail and Road

Sandwell & Dudley is a railway station serving Sandwell and Dudley, in the West Midlands, England. It lies on the Birmingham Loop of the West Coast Main Line. The station serves the towns of Oldbury and West Bromwich in the Sandwell Borough of the West Midlands County, England.

== History ==
It was originally opened as Oldbury in 1852 and was one of two stations in the town. The more centrally located Great Western Railway (GWR) Oldbury station was located on the site of the bingo hall opposite the Sainsbury's supermarket and was the only station on the GWR's Oldbury line from Langley Green.

In May 1984, the station was renamed Sandwell & Dudley, having been demolished and rebuilt by British Rail with longer platforms capable of handling long-distance InterCity trains. The station's name is somewhat misleading, as the station is not in the immediate vicinity of Dudley, with Dudley Port as the nearest.

== Services ==
The station is served by three train operating companies, with the following general off-peak services in trains per hour/day (tph/tpd):

Avanti West Coast:

- 1 tph to London Euston, via Birmingham New Street
- 1 tp2h to Edinburgh Waverley, via Wigan North Western
- 1 tp2h to Glasgow Central, via Wigan North Western.

West Midlands Railway

- 2 tph to Wolverhampton
- 2 tph to Walsall, via Birmingham New Street.

Transport for Wales:

- 1 tph to Birmingham International
- 1 tp2h to Aberystwyth and Pwllheli, via Shrewsbury; the service divides at Machynlleth
- 1 tp2h to Holyhead.

| Preceding station | National Rail | Following station |
|---|---|---|
| Wolverhampton | Avanti West Coast; West Coast Main Line | Birmingham New Street |
| Wolverhampton | Transport for Wales; Birmingham–Chester | Birmingham New Street |
| Wolverhampton | Transport for Wales; Birmingham–Aberystwyth/Pwllheli | Birmingham New Street |
| Wolverhampton towards | West Midlands Railway Birmingham–Shrewsbury | Smethwick Galton Bridge towards |
| Dudley Port towards | West Midlands Railway Wolverhampton–Birmingham–Walsall | Smethwick Galton Bridge towards |
