= Coseley railway station =

Railway station in the West Midlands, England

Coordinates: 52.545°N 2.086°W

Coseley
- Station entrance seen in 2026 from Gough Road

General information
- Location: Coseley, Metropolitan Borough of Dudley; England
- Grid reference: SO942941
- Manager: West Midlands Railway
- Transit authority: Transport for West Midlands
- Platforms: 2

Other information
- Station code: CSY
- Fare zone: 5
- Classification: DfT category E

Key dates
- 1852: Opened as Deepfields and Coseley
- 1902: Resited and renamed Coseley

Passengers
- 2021/22: ▲0.374 million
- 2022/23: ▲0.516 million
- 2023/24: ▼0.483 million
- 2024/25: ▲0.520 million
- 2025/26: ▲0.649 million
Location
Notes
- Passenger statistics from the Office of Rail and Road

Coseley railway station serves the village of Coseley and the Deepfields area in the Metropolitan Borough of Dudley, West Midlands, England. It is situated on the Rugby-Birmingham-Stafford branch of the West Coast Main Line. The station, and all trains serving it, are operated by West Midlands Trains.

== History ==
The present Coseley station opened in 1902. It replaced an earlier station, named Deepfields and Coseley, which opened in 1852 and was situated 400 yards (370 m) along the track.

== Services ==
Coseley is served by West Midlands Trains using Class 350 and Class 730 Electric multiple units.

The typical service pattern is as follows:

Mondays to Saturdays:

- 3 trains per hour (tph) northbound to Wolverhampton, departing from Platform 2
  - Of which:
    - 1 tph continues to Liverpool Lime Street via Stafford, Crewe and Runcorn.
- 3 trains per hour southbound to Birmingham New Street, departing from Platform 1
  - Of which:
    - 2 tph run as local stopping services to Walsall via Aston.

Platforms seen from road bridge, October 2026

London Northwestern Railway Class 730 EMU train heading to Liverpool Lime Street arriving at Coseley, October 2026

Previously the station was served by trains to Shrewsbury but the stop on these services was withdrawn in 2020 due largely to the COVID-19 travel restrictions. Bus service 229 stops outside offering links to Bilston Bus Station, Tipton and Dudley.

Preceding station	National Rail	Following station
Wolverhampton	West Midlands Railway Rugby–Birmingham–Stafford line	Tipton
Wolverhampton towards Liverpool Lime Street	London Northwestern Railway Birmingham–Liverpool	Smethwick Galton Bridge towards Birmingham New Street
