= Smethwick Galton Bridge railway station =

Railway station in Smethwick, England

Coordinates: 52°30′08″N 1°58′49″W

Smethwick Galton Bridge
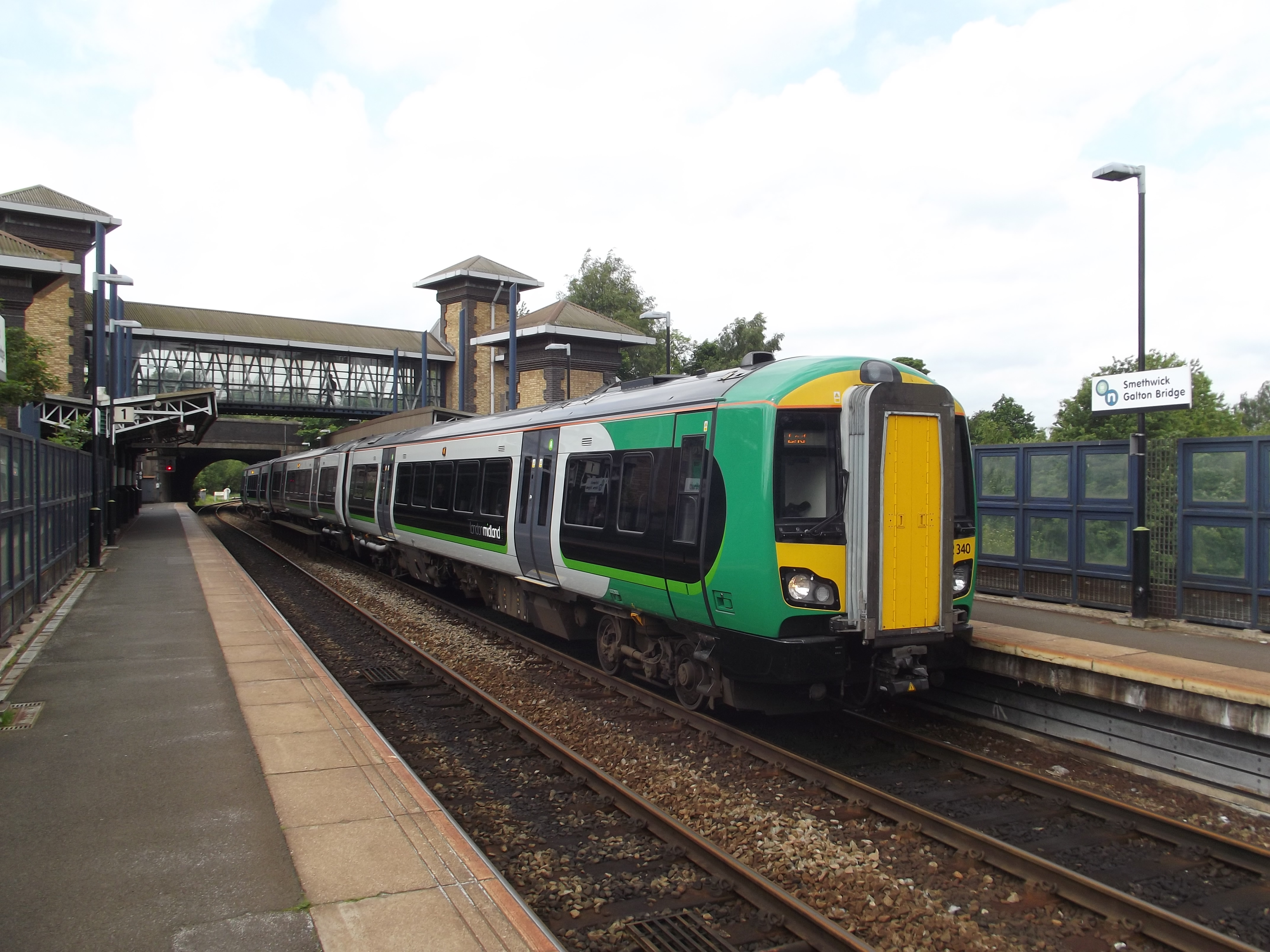
- Smethwick Galton Bridge high-level.

General information
- Location: Smethwick, Sandwell; England
- Grid reference: SP014893
- Manager: West Midlands Railway
- Transit authority: Transport for West Midlands
- Platforms: 4 (2 high level, 2 low level)

Other information
- Station code: SGB
- Fare zone: 2
- Classification: DfT category E

History
- Original company: British Rail

Key dates
- 24 September 1995: Opened

Passengers
- 2020/21: ▼0.234 million
- Interchange: ▼0.129 million
- 2021/22: ▲0.500 million
- Interchange: ▲0.369 million
- 2022/23: ▲0.660 million
- Interchange: ▲0.388 million
- 2023/24: ▲0.705 million
- Interchange: ▲0.428 million
- 2024/25: ▼0.698 million
- Interchange: ▲0.494 million
- 2025/26: ▲0.720 million
- Interchange: ▲0.613 million
Location
Notes
- Passenger statistics from the Office of Rail and Road

Smethwick Galton Bridge is a split-level railway station in Smethwick, West Midlands, England. It is at a point where two railways' lines cross on two levels. It has platforms on both lines, allowing interchange between them. The two low-level platforms serve the Birmingham New Street to Wolverhampton Line, while the two high-level platforms serve the Birmingham Snow Hill to Worcester Line. The high level line passes over the low level line at a right angle on a bridge. West Midlands Railway manages the station and operates most of its services, with others provided by Chiltern Railways and London Northwestern Railway.

Running parallel to the low-level line is the Birmingham New Main Line canal. The high-level platform extends over the canal, and the line Northbound quickly passes over a surviving section of the higher Old Main Line.

It is an important interchange; over 600,000 people changed trains at the station during 2019/20.

== History ==
The station was opened on 24 September 1995 at a cost of £4 million as part of the £28.5 million Jewellery Line scheme to reopen the line between Smethwick and Birmingham Snow Hill station. It was built as an interchange station with the Birmingham New Street-Wolverhampton line, and the platforms on both lines opened at the same time. It is named after the adjacent Galton Bridge. Upon opening, the nearby Smethwick West station became redundant and was closed soon after. A ceremony took place on 24 May 1995 to mark the completion of the new station.

== Services ==
There are four platforms at Smethwick Galton Bridge. Platforms 1 & 2 are on the Birmingham – Worcester line, whilst Platforms 3 & 4 are on the Birmingham – Wolverhampton line.

=== High-level ===
West Midlands Railway provide most of the passenger services, on the high level platforms they offer 4 tph (trains per hour) between Birmingham Snow Hill and Kidderminster using their Class 172 Turbostar DMUs, of these, 2tph continue past Kidderminster to either Worcester Shrub Hill and/or Worcester Foregate Street, with some services continuing to Great Malvern. In the opposite direction, 2tph extend beyond Snow Hill to Dorridge and 2tph Whitlocks End, with 1tph each from Dorridge and Whitlocks End extending to Stratford-Upon-Avon.

Chiltern Railways also offers an early morning peak service to London Marylebone on the Chiltern Main Line. A return journey operates on weekdays in the other direction in the evening, usually terminating at Stourbridge Junction. They formerly terminated at Kidderminster before the service to Kidderminster was withdrawn in the May 2023 timetable changes. There is no Chiltern service stopping at the station on Saturdays.

On Sundays, the level of service drops to 1tph between Dorridge and Stourbridge Junction and another tph between Stratford-Upon-Avon (via Whitlocks End) and Worcester stations, providing 2tph for Smethwick Galton Bridge between Birmingham Snow Hill and Stourbridge Junction. On Sundays there is also no return Chiltern service from London to Stourbridge.

=== Low-level ===
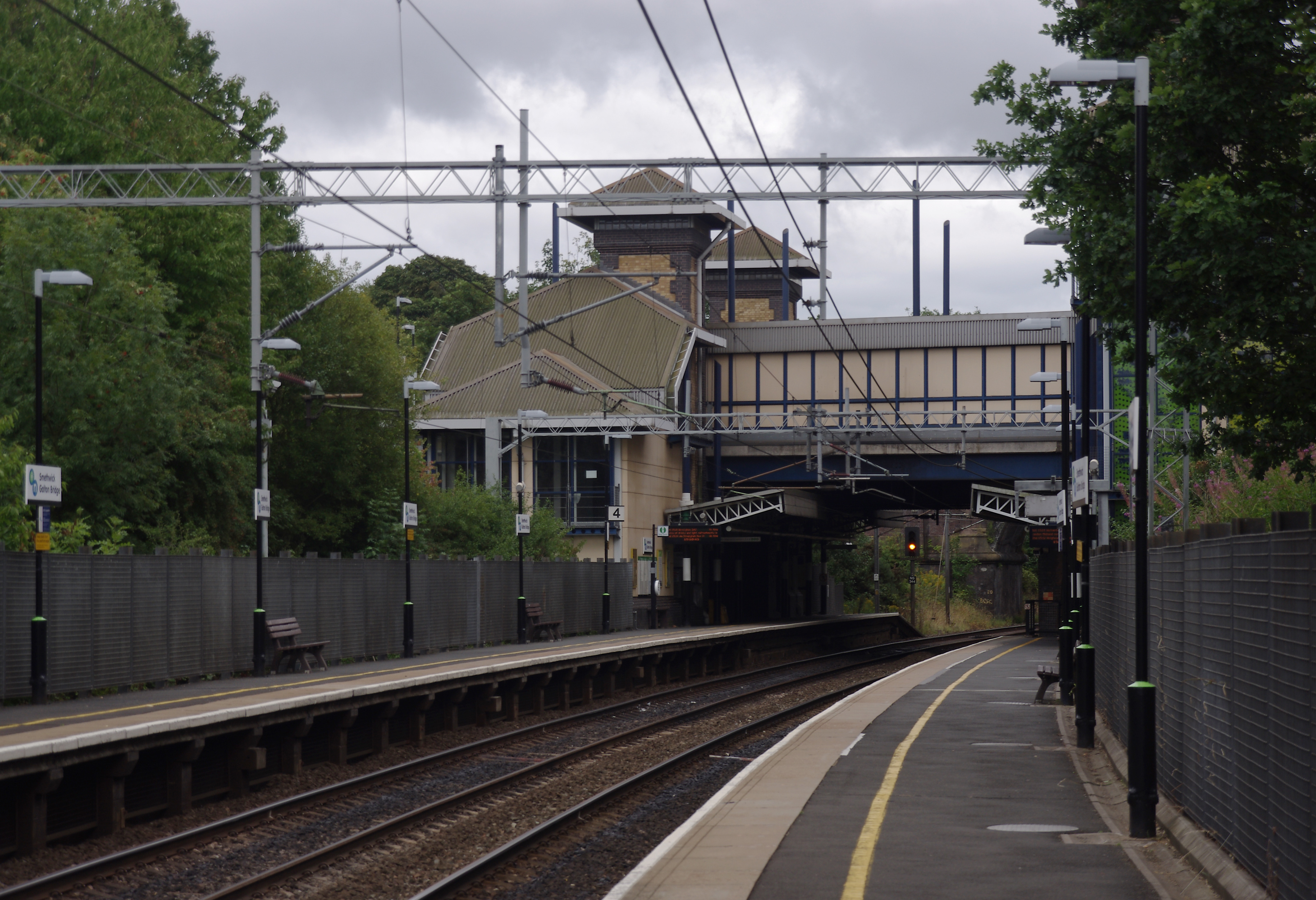
The low-level platforms

West Midlands Railway also provide the majority of the services on the lower-level platforms. A half-hourly local stopping service between Birmingham New Street and Wolverhampton operated by Class 350 or Class 730 EMUs, calls at all stops between Birmingham and Wolverhampton, with most trains continuing to Walsall after Birmingham New Street. An hourly long-distance service to/from Liverpool Lime Street via Runcorn run by London Northwestern Railway also calls, originating at Birmingham New Street operated by Class 350 EMUs. A service to and from Shrewsbury via Telford Central also calls operated by Class 196 DMUs, hourly off-peak with 2tph at peak times. Southbound the service calls at Birmingham New Street only.

On Sunday, the level of service drops to an hourly local service between Walsall and Wolverhampton, stopping at all stations on the line, an hourly service to/from Liverpool Lime Street and an hourly service to/from Shrewsbury.

The Transport for Wales calls were withdrawn and moved to Sandwell & Dudley in the December 2022 timetable change.

Avanti West Coast services regularly pass the station, but do not stop.

Preceding station	National Rail	Following station
Coseley towards Liverpool Lime Street	London Northwestern Railway Birmingham–Liverpool	Birmingham New Street Terminus
Smethwick Rolfe Street	West Midlands Railway; Walsall / Birmingham - Wolverhampton	Sandwell & Dudley
Birmingham New Street	West Midlands Railway; Birmingham - Wolverhampton - Shrewsbury	Wolverhampton
The Hawthorns	West Midlands Railway; Stratford - Birmingham - Worcester via Kidderminster	Langley Green
The Hawthorns	West Midlands Railway; Leamington Spa - Birmingham - Worcester	Langley Green
The Hawthorns	Chiltern Railways; London - Birmingham - Stourbridge; Limited service	Langley Green

== Transport Links ==
The majority of people who travel towards Smethwick Galton Bridge travel via bus. The buses that travel to Smethwick Galton Bridge are the 80 travelling towards Birmingham and West Bromwich, and the 87 bus travelling towards Dudley and Birmingham.

Provision for car parking is limited. There is a small car park next to the station and a bigger car park across the road.
