= Rugby–Birmingham–Stafford line =

UK railway line

Rugby–Birmingham–Stafford line Birmingham loop
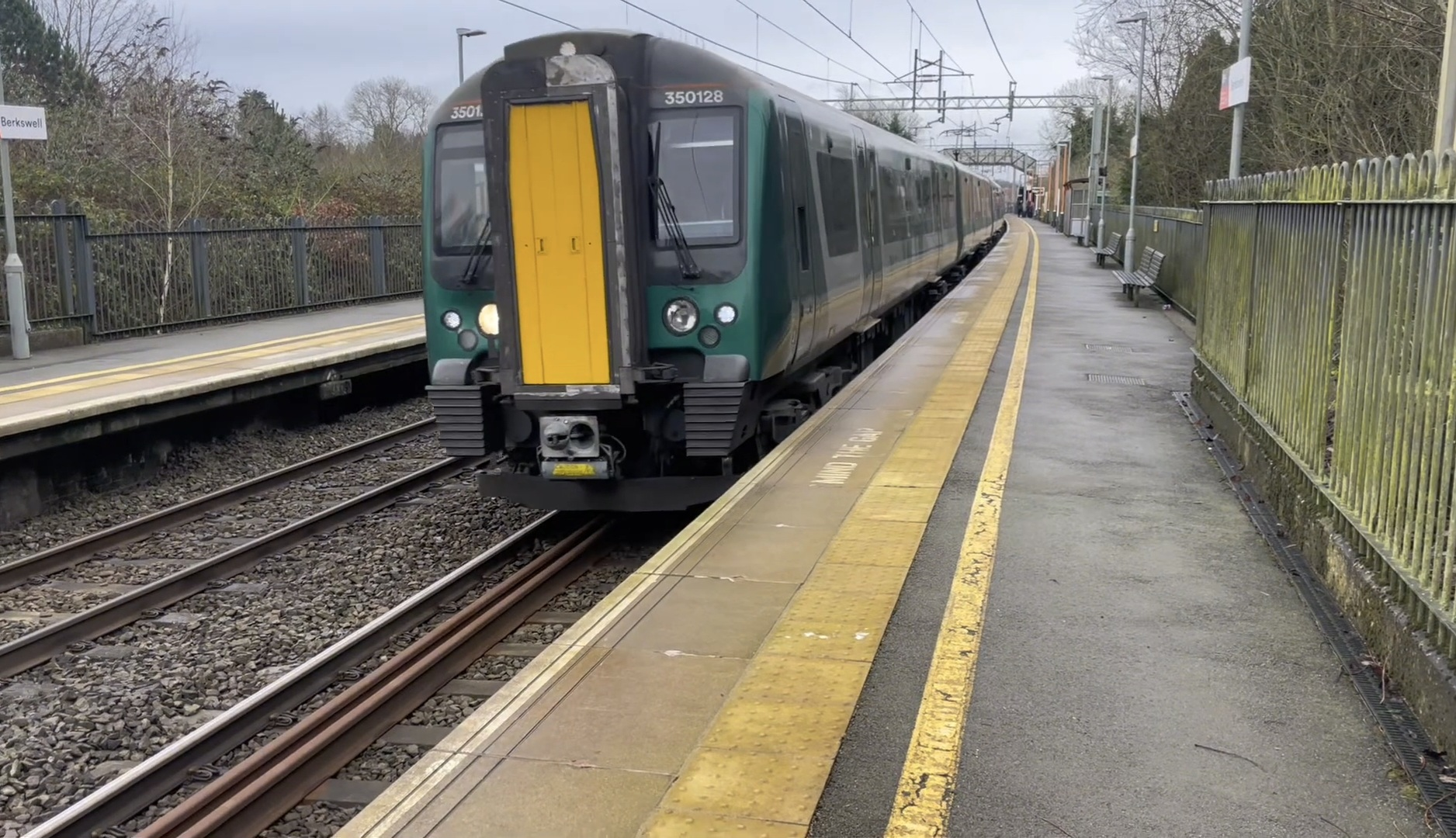
- A London Northwestern Railway Class 350 at Berkswell, April 2025

Overview
- Owner: Network Rail
- Locale: West Midlands (region); Warwickshire; West Midlands; Wolverhampton; Staffordshire
- Termini: Rugby; Stafford
- Stations: 21

History
- Opened: 1854 (complete route)

Technical
- Track gauge: 1,435 mm (4 ft 8 1/2 in) standard gauge
- Electrification: 25 kV AC overhead
- Signalling: AWS and TPWS
Route map
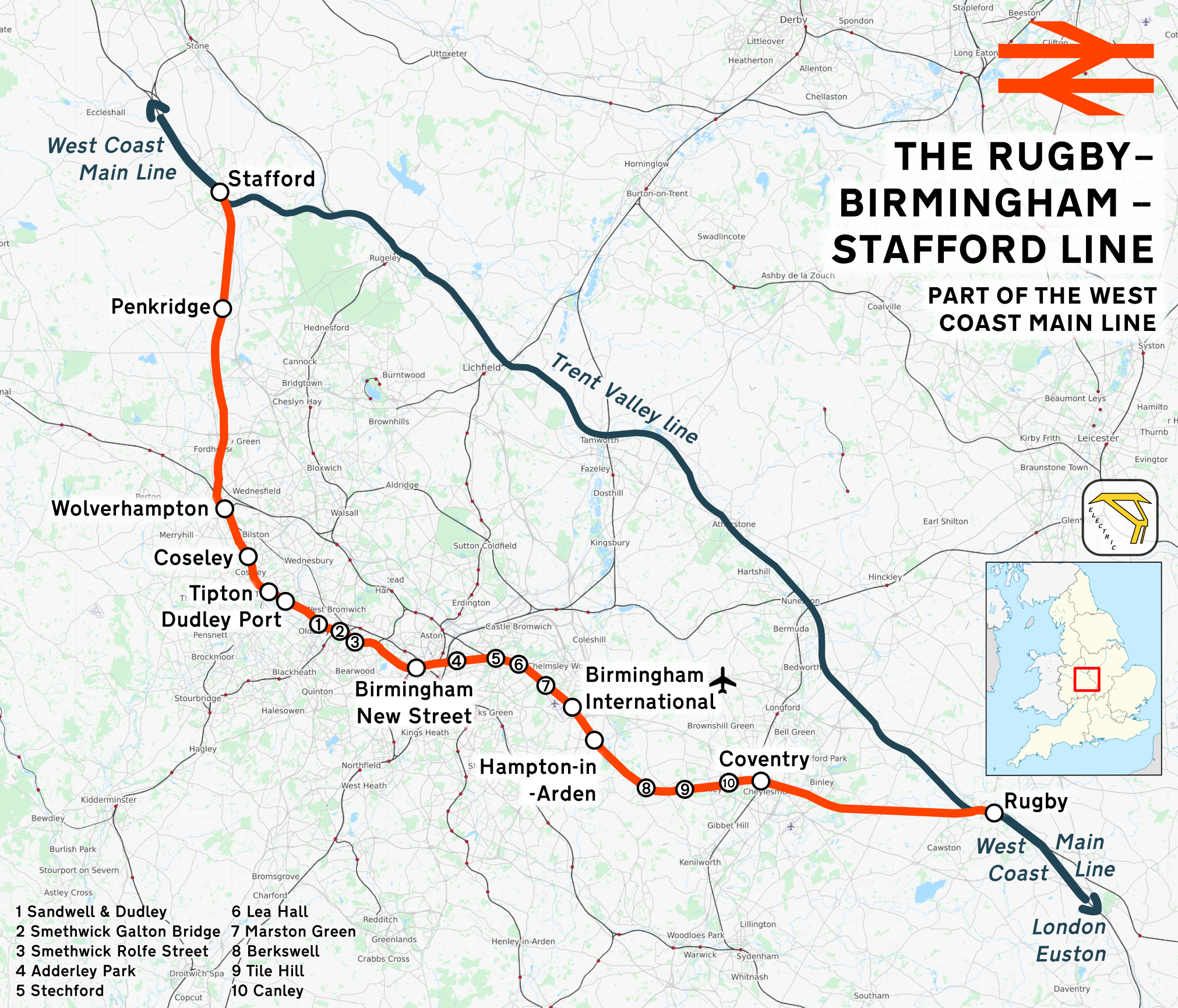
(Click to expand)

The Rugby–Birmingham–Stafford line (also known as the Birmingham loop) is a railway line in the West Midlands of England. It is a loop off the West Coast Main Line (WCML) between Rugby and Stafford, via the West Midlands cities of Coventry, Birmingham and Wolverhampton. The direct route between Rugby and Stafford is the Trent Valley line.

== Places served ==
These cities, towns and villages are served by the line:

- Stafford
- Penkridge
- Wolverhampton
- Coseley
- Tipton
- Dudley Port High Level – proposed interchange for the West Midlands Metro
- Sandwell
- Smethwick
- Birmingham
- Adderley Park (serving Saltley)
- Stechford
- Lea Hall
- Marston Green
- Birmingham International – for National Exhibition Centre and Birmingham Airport
- Hampton-in-Arden
- Berkswell
- Tile Hill
- Canley
- Coventry
- Rugby

== Services ==
A mixture of intercity, regional, cross-country and local services operate over all or parts of the route. Avanti West Coast, CrossCountry, Transport for Wales and West Midlands Trains all operate services.

- Avanti West Coast uses the route as part of their intercity service between London Euston and Birmingham New Street, some services are also extended to/from Wolverhampton, Preston, Chester or Scotland.
- West Midlands Trains also operate London-Birmingham regional trains over the route, all operating via Northampton. They also operate a Birmingham-Liverpool Lime Street service over the route and operate local services between Birmingham, Wolverhampton and Shrewsbury.
- Transport for Wales operate regional services between Birmingham International and various destinations in Wales via Shrewsbury.
- CrossCountry use part of the route for their service from Manchester Piccadilly to destinations in the south of England. Many trains on this route run via Wolverhampton, Birmingham and Coventry, turning off towards Leamington Spa.

== History ==
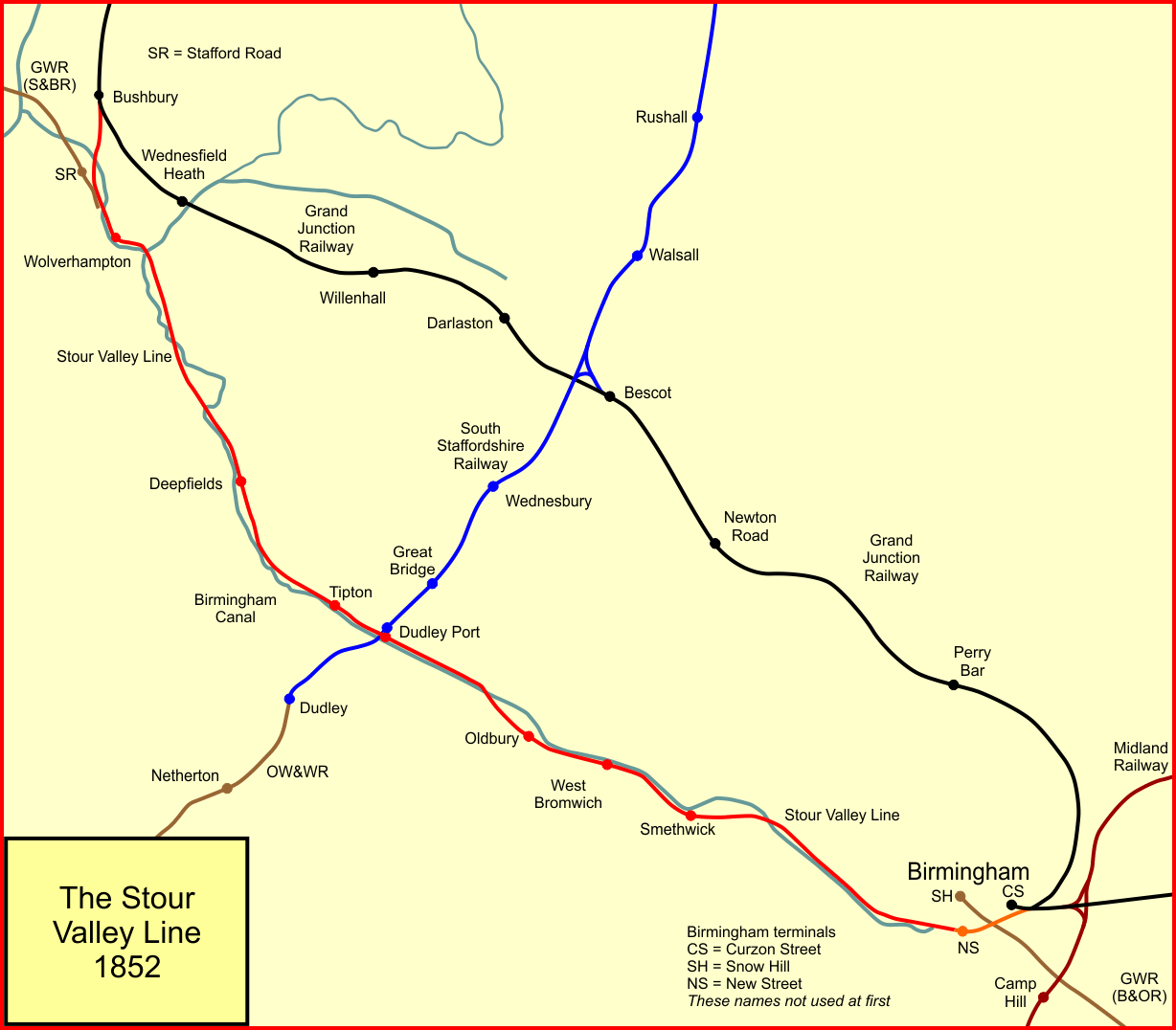
The central section of the route, the Stour Valley Line between Wolverhampton and Birmingham is shown in red, whilst the original GJR route is shown in black

The line was built in three parts, between 1837 and 1854:

- The line from Rugby to Birmingham via Coventry was opened as part of the London and Birmingham Railway, in 1838, and originally ran into its terminus at Birmingham Curzon Street.
- The Grand Junction Railway opened its line in 1837, linking Birmingham to Wolverhampton, Stafford, and the Liverpool and Manchester Railway. However, this line ran via Perry Barr to Wolverhampton (see map). The GJR originally ran to a temporary terminus at Vauxhall until a 28-span viaduct over the River Rea valley had been completed in 1839, allowing it to reach Curzon Street. The London and Birmingham, and Grand Junction railways merged in 1846 to form the London and North Western Railway (LNWR). Soon after, work started on building a new, more centrally located station in Birmingham, which became known as Birmingham New Street station, which opened formally in 1854.
- On 1 July 1852, the Stour Valley Line from Wolverhampton to Birmingham on a more southerly route via Tipton and Smethwick opened. It started at Bushbury, just north of Wolverhampton where it joined the Grand Junction Railway, and ran to Birmingham New Street. Its route included the current Wolverhampton station. It was promoted by the Birmingham, Wolverhampton and Stour Valley Railway, which was soon absorbed by the LNWR.

The LNWR itself became part of the London, Midland and Scottish Railway (LMS) in 1923, and part of British Railways during Nationalisation in 1948.

The line was electrified along with the rest of the WCML during the late 1960s in the wake of the BR 1955 Modernisation Plan.

In 1987, British Rail commissioned artist Kevin Atherton to produce a series of sculptures to be erected along the line between Birmingham New Street station and Wolverhampton. The finished piece was titled Iron Horse, and consists of twelve different horse silhouettes, fashioned from steel. The construction material was chosen for its historic associations with the Black Country.

Many of the smaller stations on the line were closed in the 1950s and 60s, especially between Birmingham and Wolverhampton. However, some new stations were opened in the late 20th century: Birmingham International station was opened in 1976 to serve Birmingham Airport and the National Exhibition Centre, and in 1995 another new station; Smethwick Galton Bridge was opened, serving as a two-level interchange with trains on the Birmingham Snow Hill to Worcester Line.

There were also three services a day to Walsall, until a timetable change in May 2019 saw it removed and replaced by two morning services per day to Shrewsbury.

=== Accidents ===
- 1967 – Stechford rail crash; 9 killed, 16 injured.

== Infrastructure ==
Despite the heavy traffic carried by the line, it is only double track throughout, and heavily congested, especially between Coventry and Birmingham. In the 1930s, the London, Midland and Scottish Railway (LMS) started work on quadrupling the line between Coventry and Birmingham, however only preparatory work was carried out before the scheme was cancelled due to the outbreak of World War II. Periodic calls have been made since to quadruple the line between Coventry and Birmingham to ease congestion.

The line is electrified with overhead wires at 25 kV AC.

== Future proposals ==
In 2023, Transport for West Midlands (TfWM) and the West Midlands Rail Executive (WMRE) put forward plans to open a new station at Binley on the line between Coventry and Rugby named Coventry East (Binley), serving the eastern part of Coventry.
