= Birmingham station group =

Station group in Birmingham city centre, England

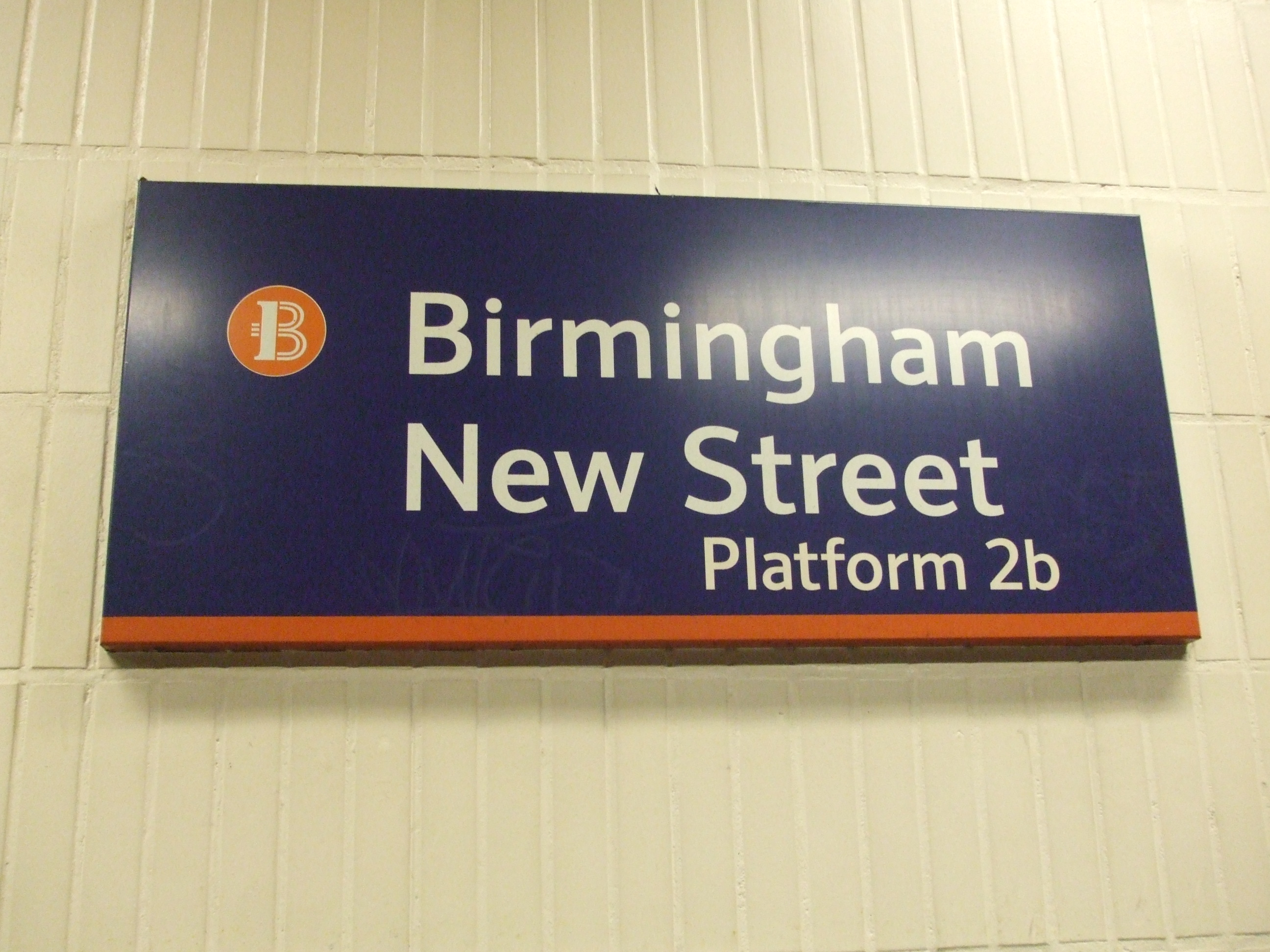
Birmingham New Street station sign

The Birmingham station group is a station group of three railway stations in Birmingham city centre, consisting of New Street, Moor Street, and Snow Hill. The station group is printed on national railway tickets as BIRMINGHAM STNS and does not include the airport station of Birmingham International, which is located approximately 7.5 miles (12.1 km) east of the city centre next to Birmingham Airport and National Exhibition Centre.

There are two other railway stations in central Birmingham – Five Ways on the Cross-City Line and Jewellery Quarter on the Birmingham to Worcester via Kidderminster line.

== Stations ==
=== Birmingham New Street ===
Birmingham New Street is Birmingham's principal railway station and one of the principal stations of the UK rail network. The station is managed by Network Rail and its main entrance is located on Stephenson Street. New Street is the main gateway for most people arriving in the city and serves most of the city rail services, providing links all across the United Kingdom. Services are provided by Avanti West Coast, CrossCountry, Transport for Wales and West Midlands Trains.

==== Train ====
Avanti West Coast

- 3 tph to London Euston, all trains calling at Birmingham International and Coventry, of which 1 tph call additionally at Rugby, Milton Keynes Central and Watford Junction
- 1 tph to Preston via Wolverhampton, Stafford and Crewe, with services alternating between extending towards Blackpool North (2 tpd), Edinburgh Waverley (1 tp2h) and Glasgow Central (5 tpd)

CrossCountry

- 2 tph to Manchester Piccadilly via Wolverhampton, Stafford and Stoke-on-Trent
- 2 tph to Bristol Temple Meads, with 1 tph continuing on to Plymouth and 2 tpd continuing to each of Penzance and Paignton
- 2 tph to Nottingham via Derby
- 1 tph to Bournemouth via Oxford, Reading and Southampton Central
- 2 tph to Leicester via Nuneaton, of which 1 tph continues to Cambridge via Peterborough, of which 1 tp2h continues to Stansted Airport
- 1 tph to Cardiff Central via Cheltenham Spa, Gloucester and Newport.
- 1 tph to Edinburgh Waverley via Leeds and Newcastle, of which 1 tpd continues to each of Glasgow Central and Aberdeen via Dundee

West Midlands Railway

- 2 tph to Bromsgrove
- 2 tph to Redditch
- 2 tph to Four Oaks
- 2 tph to Lichfield Trent Valley via Four Oaks
- 2 tph to Wolverhampton
- 2 tph to Walsall
- 2 tph to Rugeley Trent Valley via Walsall
- 2 tph to Birmingham International
- 1 tph to Hereford via Bromsgrove & Worcester Foregate Street
- 2 tph to Shrewsbury via Wolverhampton and Telford Central
- 2 tph to Kings Norton

London Northwestern Railway

- 2 tph to London Euston via Coventry & Northampton
- 1 tph to Liverpool Lime Street via Wolverhampton and Crewe, 2 tph on Saturdays

Transport for Wales

- 1 tph to Birmingham International
- 1 tph to Shrewsbury, continuing alternately to Chester and Holyhead, or Aberystwyth/Pwllheli

Preceding station	National Rail	Following station
Birmingham International	Transport for Wales; Birmingham - Wales	Sandwell and Dudley
Birmingham International	CrossCountry; Bournemouth - Manchester	Wolverhampton
Cheltenham Spa	CrossCountry; Bristol - Manchester	Wolverhampton
Leamington Spa	CrossCountry; Reading - Newcastle	Derby
Cheltenham Spa	CrossCountry; Plymouth - Edinburgh	Tamworth or Burton-on-Trent
University or Terminus	CrossCountry; Cardiff - Birmingham - Nottingham	Wilnecote or Tamworth
Terminus	CrossCountry; Birmingham - Leicester - Stansted Airport	Water Orton or Coleshill Parkway
Moseley Village	West Midlands Railway; Camp Hill line	Terminus
University	West Midlands Railway; Hereford - Birmingham	Terminus
Smethwick Galton Bridge or Tame Bridge Parkway	West Midlands Railway; Shrewsbury - Birmingham	Terminus
Aston or Duddeston	West Midlands Railway; Cross City Line	Five Ways
Duddeston	West Midlands Railway; Walsall - Aston - Birmingham - Wolverhampton	Smethwick Rolfe Street
Terminus	West Midlands Railway; Birmingham - Walsall - Rugeley	Tame Bridge Parkway
Adderley Park	West Midlands Railway; Birmingham International - Birmingham New Street	Terminus
Terminus	London Northwestern Railway; Birmingham - Liverpool	Smethwick Galton Bridge or Coseley
Marston Green or Stechford	London Northwestern Railway; London - Birmingham	Terminus
Birmingham International	Avanti West Coast; London - Birmingham - Scotland	Terminus or Sandwell & Dudley
	Historical railways	
Monument Lane	London & North Western Railway; Stour Valley Line	Duddeston or Adderley Park
Terminus	London & North Western Railway; Birmingham–Peterborough line	Adderley Park
Five Ways	Midland Railway; Cross City Line	Saltley
Camp Hill	Midland Railway; Camp Hill line	Terminus

==== Tram ====
The Grand Central stop of the West Midlands Metro is located outside the Stephenson Street exit, with trams running between Edgbaston Village and Wolverhampton Station/St Georges, services run at up to an 8 minute frequency.

Preceding station	West Midlands Metro	Following station
Corporation Street	Line 1	Town Hall

=== Birmingham Moor Street ===
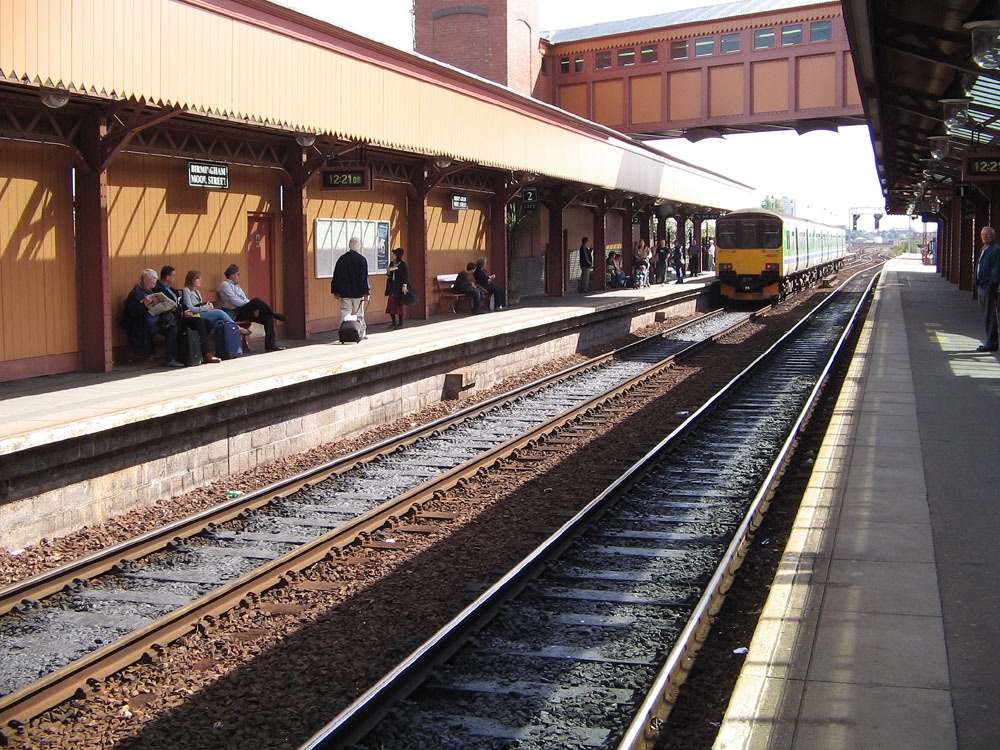
The two through platforms at Moor Street

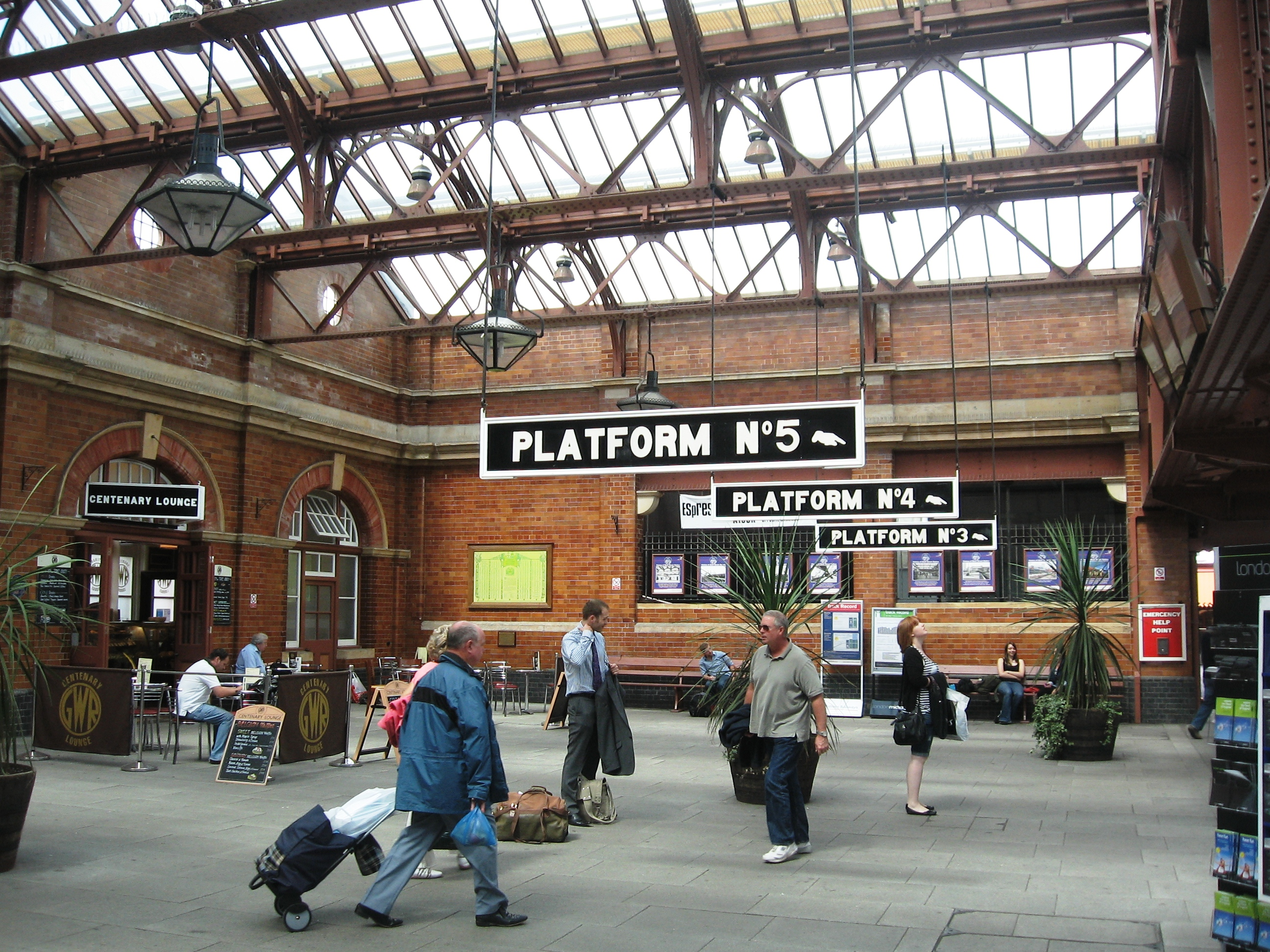
Birmingham Moor Street's booking hall

Birmingham Moor Street is the city's second busiest station and is currently served by local trains for the lines through Shirley and Henley-in-Arden to Stratford-upon-Avon and to Leamington via Solihull, and Chiltern Clubman services to London Marylebone. Chiltern also operate a limited number of weekday services from Marylebone terminating at Moor Street formed of class 67 locomotives and hauled coaching stock. On summer Sundays it is used by steam locomotives running tourist specials between Snow Hill and Stratford upon Avon and trains between Snow Hill and Tyseley for Vintage Trains. The station is located on Moor Street Queensway opposite the Pavilions Shopping Centre and the Bull Ring. Services are provided by Chiltern Railways and West Midlands Trains.

Preceding station	National Rail	Following station
Birmingham Snow Hill	Chiltern Railways; Chiltern Main Line	Solihull or Tyseley
Terminus	Chiltern Railways; Chiltern Main Line	Solihull or Tyseley
Birmingham Snow Hill	West Midlands Railway; Leamington/Stratford-Worcester	Bordesley on matchdays
Birmingham Snow Hill	West Midlands Railway; Leamington/Stratford-Worcester	Small Heath
	Heritage railways	
Birmingham Snow Hill	Vintage Trains; Shakespeare Express; July–September	Tyseley

=== Birmingham Snow Hill ===
Birmingham Snow Hill is located on Colmore Row and Livery Street and is managed by West Midlands Trains. Snow Hill provides a link between the Snow Hill Lines and the West Midlands Metro.

Chiltern Railways

- 1 tp2h off-peak/1 tph in peak periods to London Marylebone via Solihull, Dorridge, Warwick, Leamington Spa, Banbury and High Wycombe
- The first London-bound service begins at Stourbridge Junction
- 3 tpd extend northwards in the evening peak to Stourbridge Junction, via Smethwick Galton Bridge and Rowley Regis
- 1 tpd terminates short of London Marylebone at Leamington Spa
- The last two London-bound services of the day terminate at Banbury

West Midlands Railway

- 2 tph to Worcester Forgate Street, via Stourbridge Junction and Kidderminster, of which 1 tph calls additionally at Worcester Shrub Hill
- 2 tph to Kidderminster, via Stourbridge Junction
- 2 tph to Dorridge, via Solihull, of which 1 tph continues to Stratford-upon-Avon
- 2 tph to Whitlocks End, oh which 1 tph continues to Stratford-upon-Avon

Preceding station	National Rail	Following station
Jewellery Quarter	West Midlands Railway; Snow Hill Lines	Birmingham Moor Street
Terminus	Chiltern Railways; London-Kidderminster	Birmingham Moor Street
Jewellery Quarter	Chiltern Railways; London-Kidderminster	Birmingham Moor Street
	Heritage railways	
Terminus	Vintage Trains; Shakespeare Express; July–September	Birmingham Moor Street
	Disused railways	
Hockley	Great Western Railway & BR; Various Routes (1854–1972)	Bordesley

== Connections ==
Tickets marked as BIRMINGHAM STNS may be used to exit the railway network at any of the three city stations, as stated above Birmingham International is not part of the station group. All three city centre stations are less than one mile (1.6 km) from each other, with the shortest distance being between Moor Street and New Street. Birmingham New Street is approximately 0.5 miles (0.80 km) from Snow Hill and a quarter mile walk from Moor Street.

A direct and regular train service is in operation between Moor Street and Snow Hill through a tunnel, and since mid-2016 the Midland Metro provides a link between Snow Hill and New Street.

Birmingham New Street and Moor Street are close to the major shopping centres in the city including Grand Central (formerly known as The Pallasades) and the Bullring. All three stations have a good interchange with bus services mostly operated by National Express West Midlands.

== See also ==
- Transport in Birmingham
- Transport for West Midlands

== Bibliography ==
- https://web.archive.org/web/20111002160621/http://centro.journalistpresslounge.com/centro/news/index.cfm/fuseaction/details/id/BE043D85-13D3-97AA-2D4BEE37003FF84F/cnt/1/ref/main/type/News%20releases/ses/1.cfm
