= GWR 4900 Class 5972 Olton Hall =

Preserved British steam locomotive

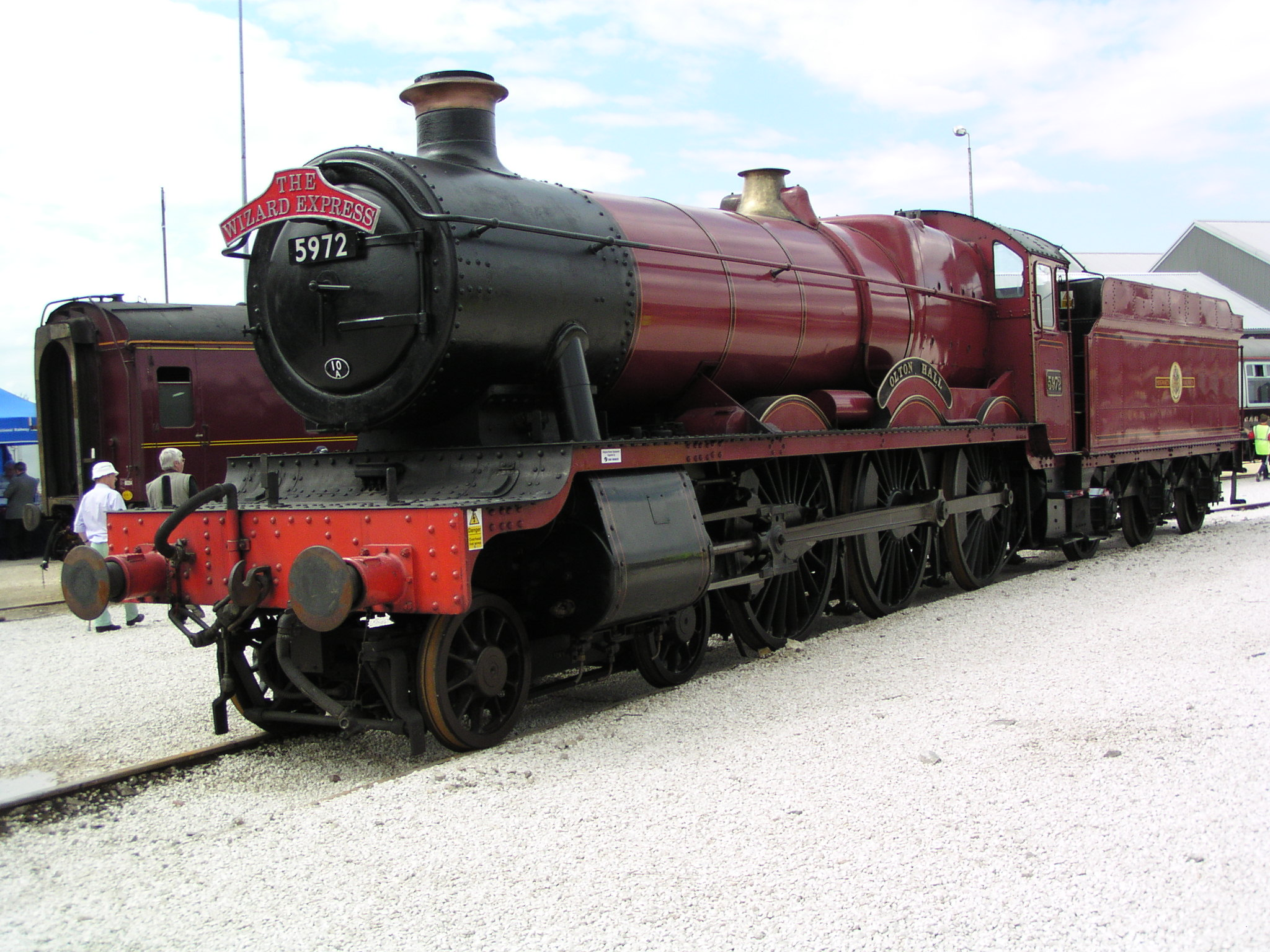
- 5972 Olton Hall at Doncaster Works in July 2003
Type and origin
- Power type: Steam
- Designer: Charles Collett
- Builder: GWR Swindon Works
- Build date: 30 April 1937
Specifications
- Configuration
  - Whyte: 4-6-0
- Loco weight: 75 tons (67 long tons; 68 t)
- Fuel type: Coal
- Cylinders: Two, outside
Career
- Operators: Great Western Railway; British Railways
- Class: Hall
- Numbers: 5972
- Official name: Olton Hall
- First run: 30 April 1937
- Last run: December 1963
- Retired: April 1964
- Withdrawn: 31 December 1963
- Restored: 20 May 1998
- Current owner: West Coast Railways
- Disposition: On static display

5972 Olton Hall is a preserved Hall class 4-6-0 steam locomotive, made famous for its role hauling the Hogwarts Express in the Harry Potter film series.

== History ==
=== Service ===
Built in April 1937 at Swindon Works for the Great Western Railway (GWR), No. 5972 was first allocated to Carmarthen, South Wales where it remained until 1951. After being fitted with a three-row superheater at Swindon Works, it was allocated to Plymouth Laira. Its last shed allocation was to Cardiff East Dock, before it was withdrawn in December 1963, and sold to Woodham Brothers, Barry for scrap in May 1964.

=== Preservation ===
Woodham Brothers sold the locomotive to David Smith and it moved to Horbury railway works in Wakefield in May 1981. In 1994, it moved to Carnforth MPD for restoration, being steamed for the first time in 1998.

=== Harry Potter film series ===
In the Harry Potter films, the locomotive is depicted pulling the Hogwarts Express, a fictional train, made up of four (later five) British Rail Mark 1 carriages. Scenes were filmed at King's Cross railway station, the Glenfinnan Viaduct and the North Yorkshire Moors Railway — along with internal scenes on board the train.

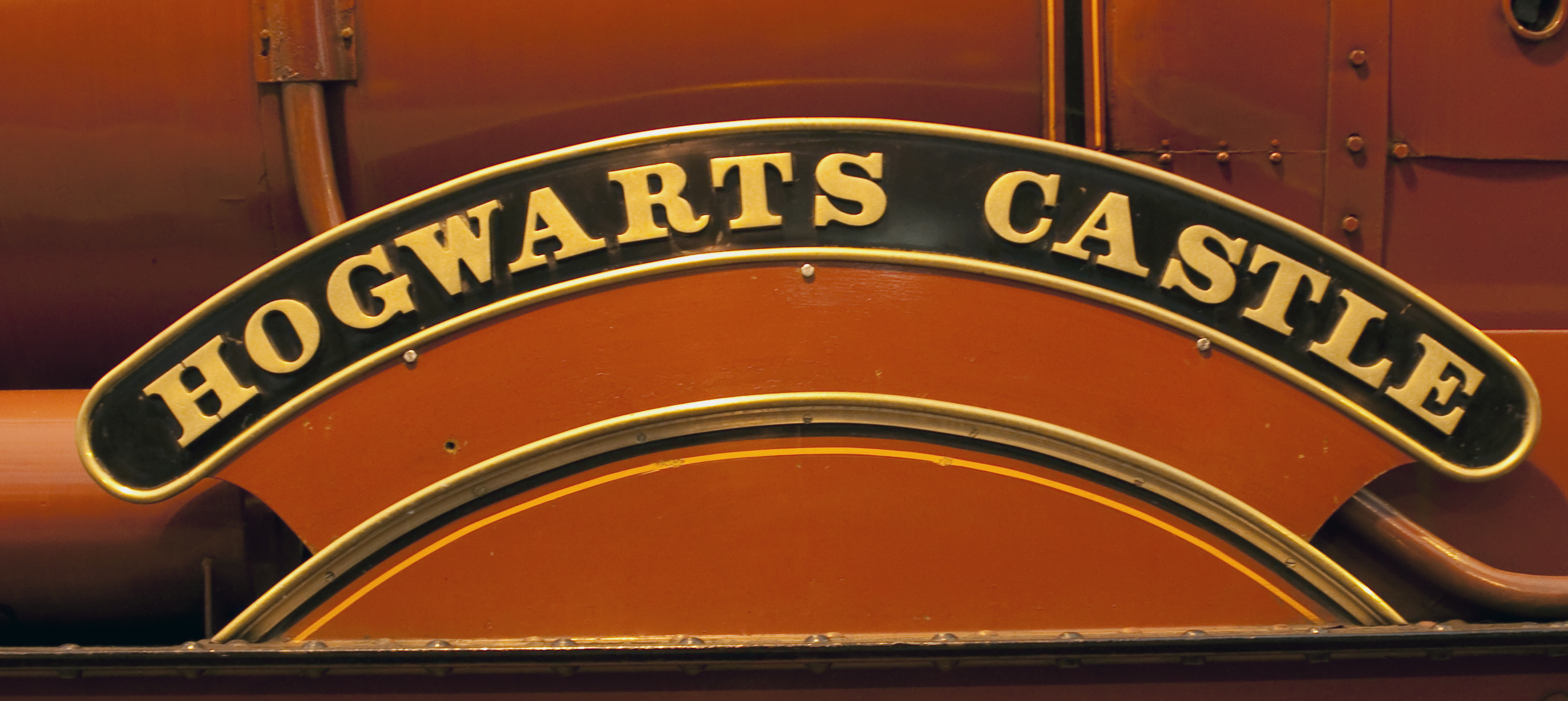
Hogwarts Castle name plate

When filmed, Olton Hall carried a "Hogwarts Express" headboard on the smokebox, featuring the Hogwarts school crest. The same emblem is featured as part of the "Hogwarts Railways" sigil on the tender and carriages. It retained its GWR number of 5972, but with alternative nameplates fitted, naming the engine Hogwarts Castle. It is painted in a crimson livery — a non-standard colour, as GWR locomotives traditionally used green.

Olton Hall was not the first locomotive to be re-liveried to appear hauling the Hogwarts Express. To promote the fourth Harry Potter book, Harry Potter and the Goblet of Fire, Southern Railway West Country Class locomotive 34027 Taw Valley was temporarily repainted and renamed. However, it was rejected by film director Chris Columbus as looking "too modern" for the film, but it carried the name and colour for some months afterwards.

The renaming as "...Castle" has become a railway preservation joke: "...the Hall that thinks it's a Castle." The Great Western Railway Castle Class engines were larger, faster locomotives designed for prestigious express passenger duties; whereas the Halls were a mixed-traffic design. Its whistle sound is not original: Castle and Hall class locomotives had two single-note "bell whistles" which were singularly operated, but in the movies they used a three-note "chime whistle", specifically the one from Britannia class 70000.

In 2015, the locomotive was put on static display at Warner Bros. Studio Tour London - The Making of Harry Potter, near Watford, and will be displayed there until Warner Bros' lease on the locomotive from West Coast Railways expires.

=== Non-Hogwarts work ===
No. 5972 has been used for work other than its "Hogwarts" duties. In May 2009, it was moved temporarily to the Gloucestershire Warwickshire Railway, and in July 2009, it was based at Tyseley Locomotive Works for use on some of the regular Shakespeare Express trains run by Vintage Trains during the summer. It returned to the Gloucestershire Warwickshire Railway during their annual Wizard's Weekend event in 2010. In late 2011 the locomotive was on static display in Hyde Park, London. Just before its boiler and mainline certificates expired, on 7 June & 12 July 2014, it worked two final Wizards Express rail tours from Manchester to York with 5972 working the trains between Carnforth and York in both directions (as far as Hellifield on the return leg of June's trip).

=== Replicas ===
Three full-size replicas of the locomotive as No. 5972 Hogwarts Castle are at The Wizarding World of Harry Potter (Universal Orlando Resort). Two are used as part of the Hogwarts Express train ride and the other is a static exhibit in the Hogsmeade area. There are also static models at the other Wizarding World of Harry Potter locations in Hollywood and Japan.

In addition, in December 2021 classmate 4920 Dumbleton Hall was exported to Japan to form part of the Warner Bros Studio Tour in Tokyo where it wears the Hogwarts Castle livery and nameplates.

== Models ==
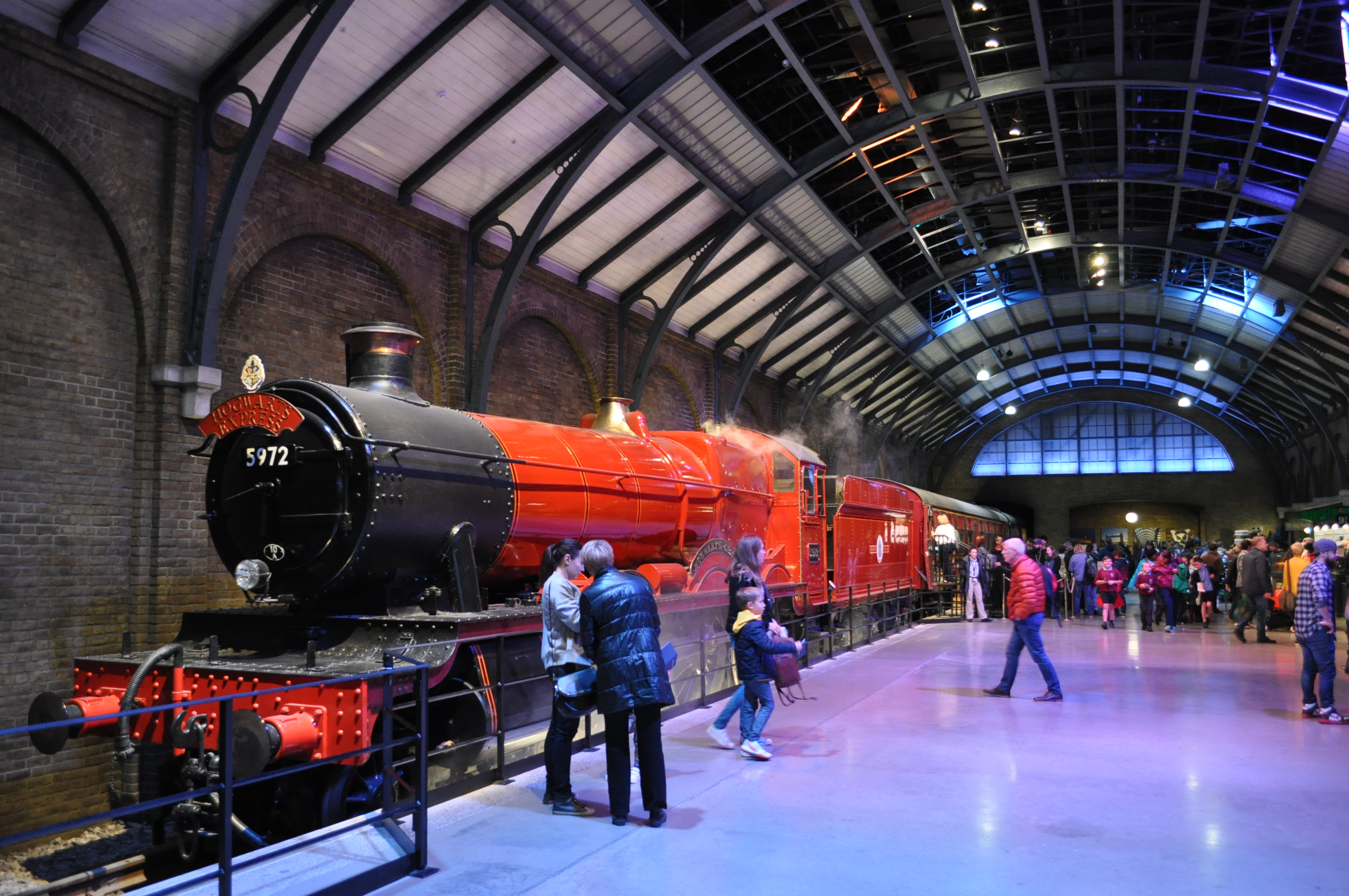
Olton Hall as Hogwarts Castle on static display at the Harry Potter Studio Tour in Leavesden

Hornby Railways produces a model of Olton Hall in OO gauge. The model is also available decorated as Hogwarts Castle, as part of their Harry Potter film tie-in range. The Harry Potter version has an LED headlight, which the other versions do not.

A previous Hornby model of the locomotive was actually a model of a Castle class locomotive, not a Hall. Tri-ang Hornby had released a model of the Hall class in 1966; however, this model was last offered in 1983 as 4930 Hagley Hall, a preserved locomotive on the Severn Valley Railway. While Hornby (the successor to Tri-ang Hornby) may still have the moulds, they were modified some years ago to produce a Saint class replica. New tooling for a Hall has since been introduced and is available in the current Hornby range (see below).

Other manufacturers have perpetuated this error, with Märklin using a Castle in its Hogwarts Express set. While Bachmann Branchline did produce models of the 'Hall' and 'Modified Hall' class locomotives, they have not offered one as 5972 "Hogwarts Castle (Olton Hall)", though Bachmann USA released one in their range.

In 2015, Hornby introduced an all-new model of Olton Hall as part of their "Railroad" range, originally announced in 2012.

In 2019, Hornby announced a new Harry Potter range, comprising a range of Hogsmeade buildings based on the Goathland range from several years ago, and the Hogwarts Express train set. Also available are two separate Hogwarts Castle locomotives with headlight, one being TTS Sound fitted. This is the first Hogwarts Castle model they have released being correctly of a Hall class. It is based on the same tooling as the 2015 Olton Hall model.

In 2022, Lego announced a detailed brick-built model of the train as it appears in the Harry Potter films.

== Gallery ==
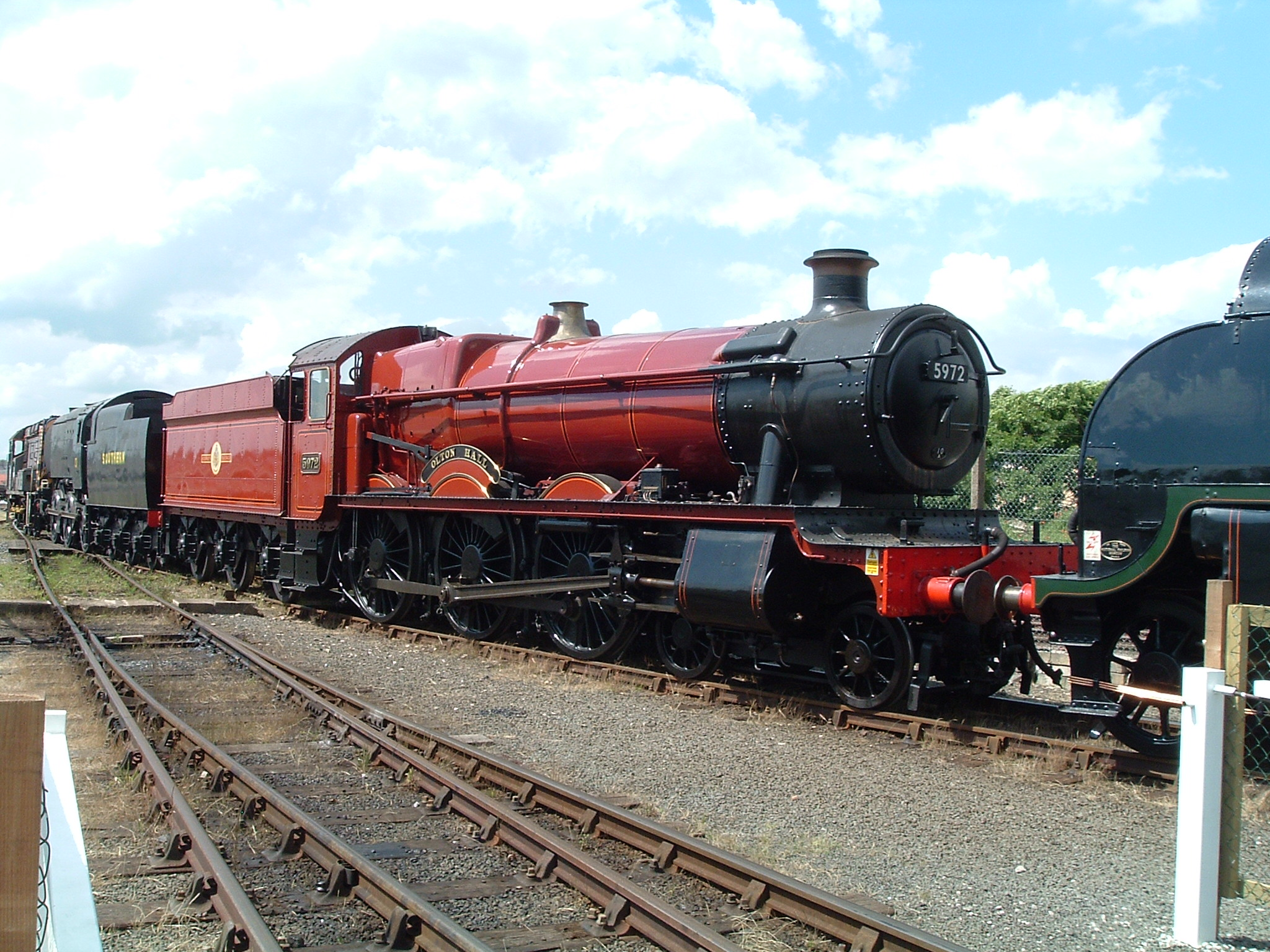
No. 5972 at the National Railway Museum in June 2004.

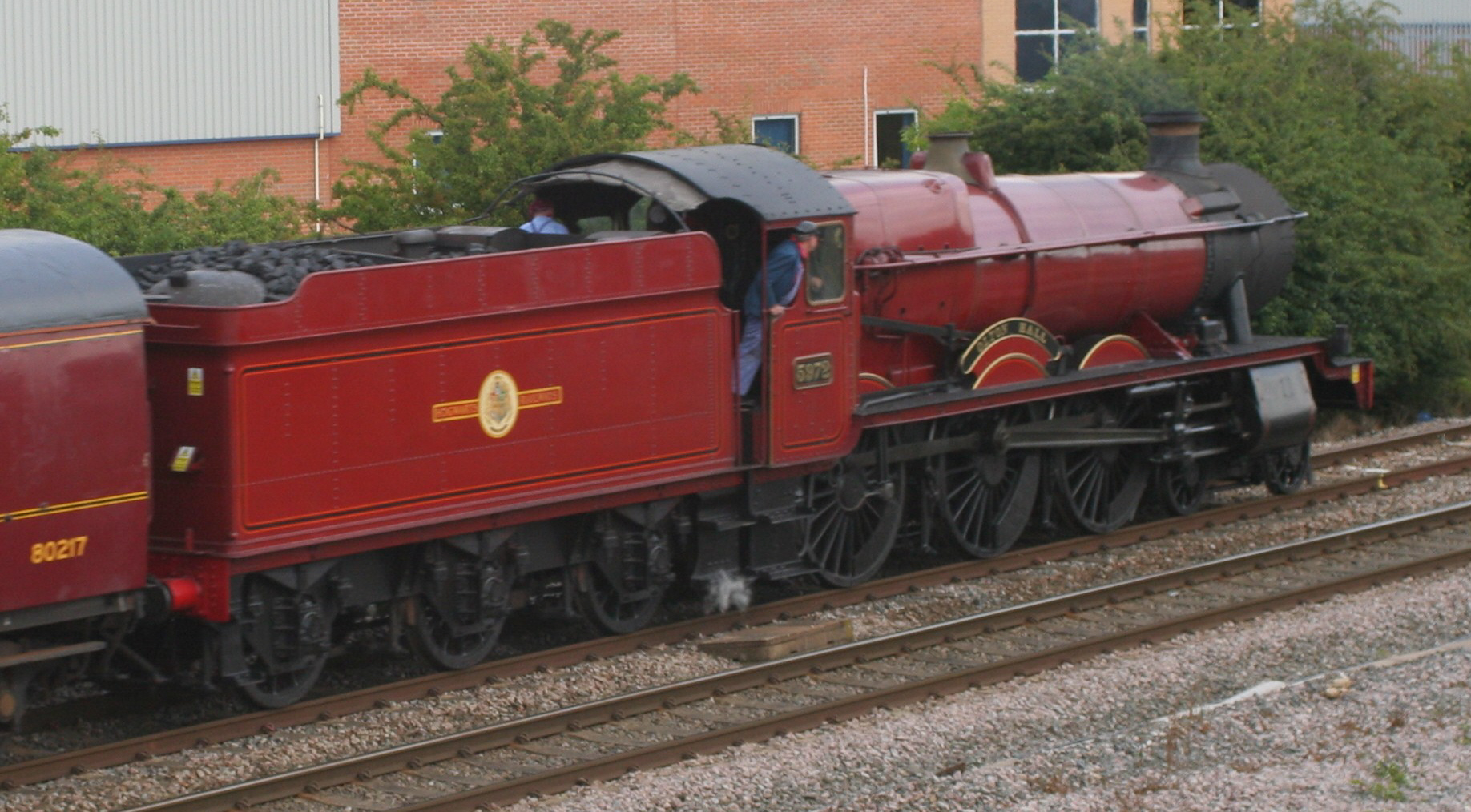
No. 5972 departing from Tyseley in July 2009.

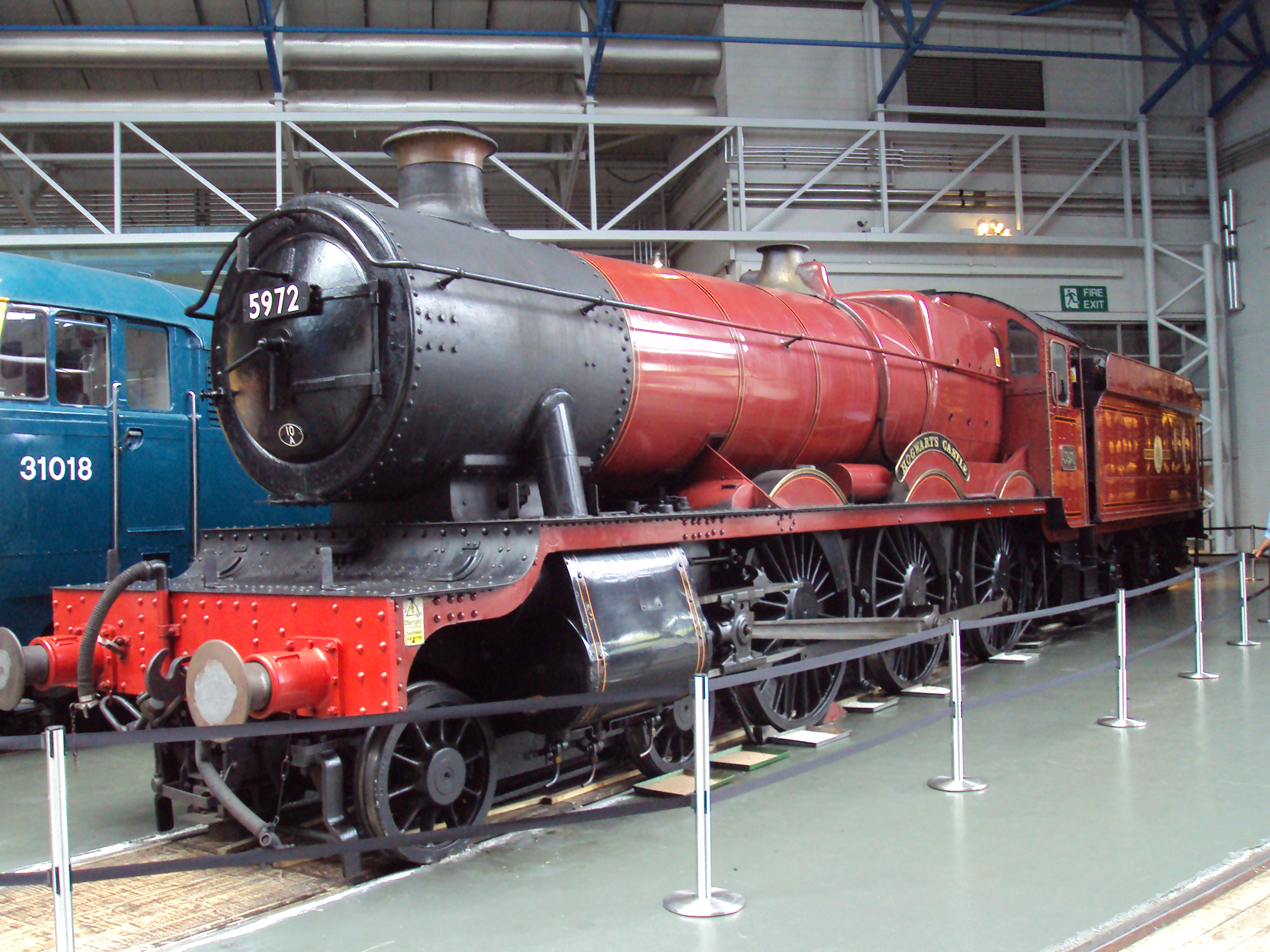
No. 5972 on static display at the National Railway Museum in August 2010.

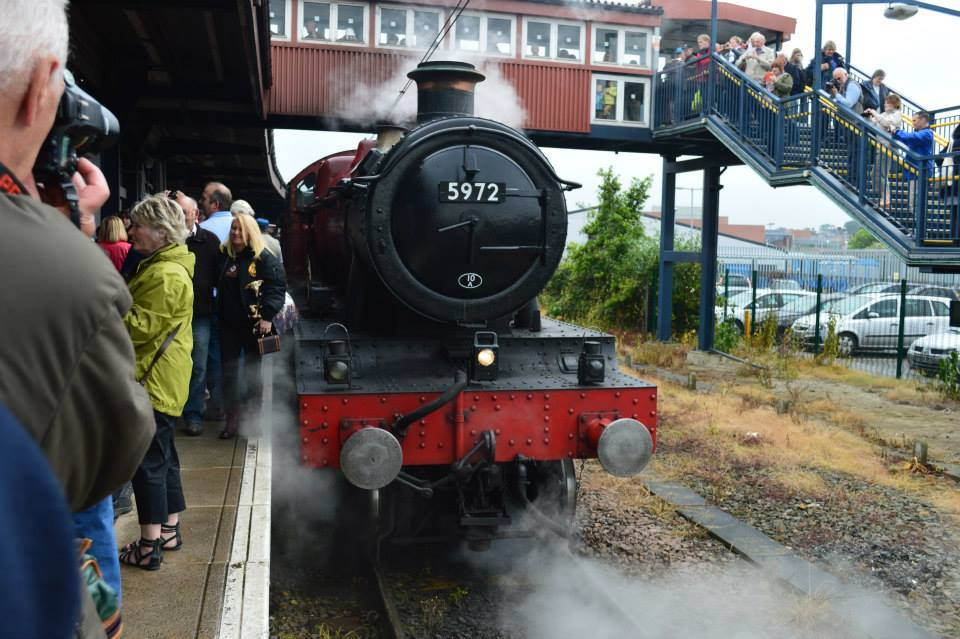
No. 5972 at York station in June 2014.
