= Shakespeare Express =

U.K. heritage excursion train

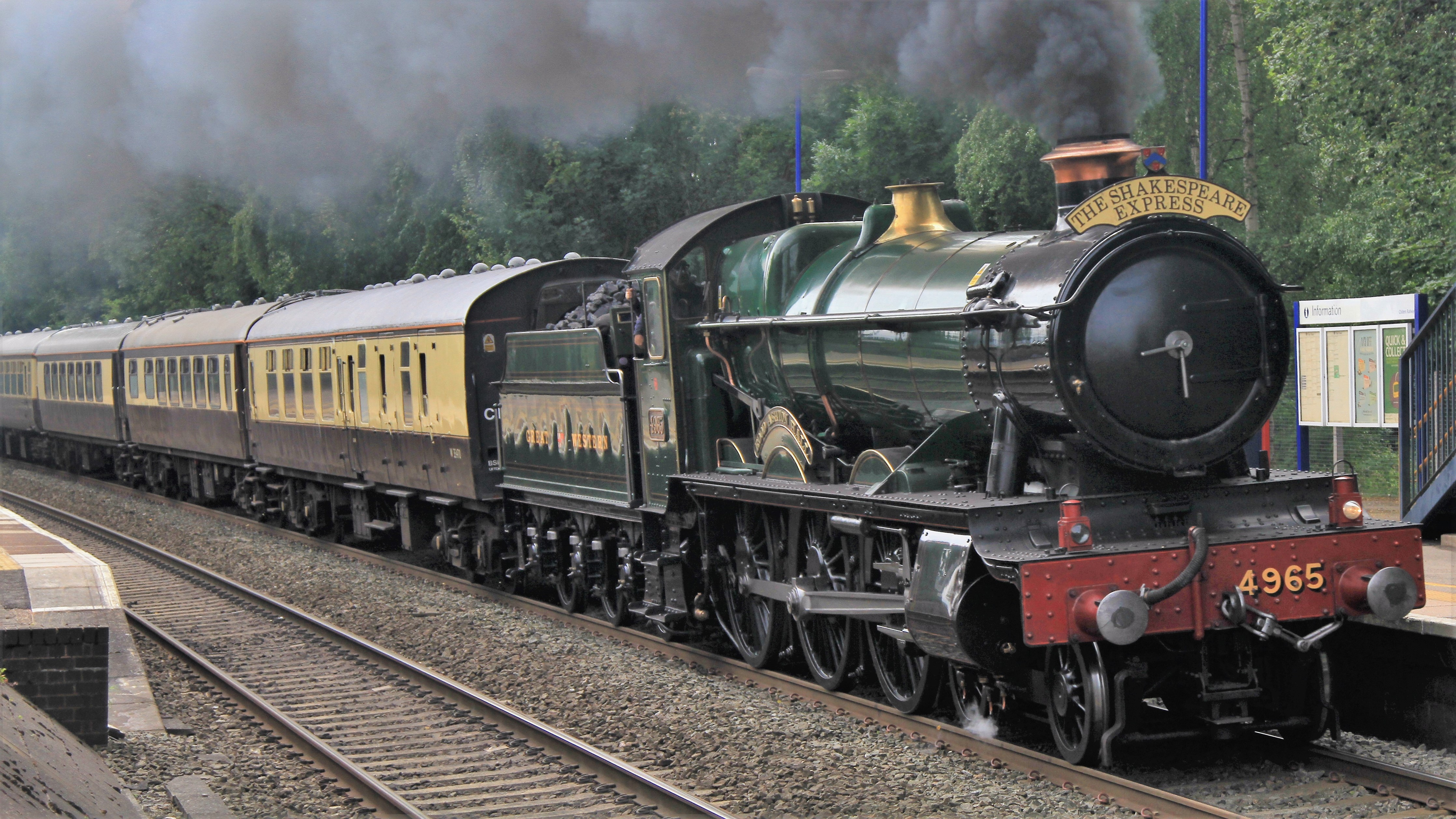
- 4965 Rood Ashton Hall hauling a Shakespeare Express service through Lapworth in July 2016

Overview
- Service type: Passenger excursion train
- First service: 1999
- Current operator: Vintage Trains

Route
- Termini: Birmingham Snow Hill; Stratford-upon-Avon
- Stops: Birmingham Moor Street; Tyseley
- Distance travelled: 50 miles
- Service frequency: Selected Summer Sundays
- Train number: 158Y-161Y
- Lines used: North Warwickshire; Leamington Stratford; Chiltern

On-board services
- Classes: First and Standard
- Catering facilities: Yes

The Shakespeare Express is a steam-hauled passenger excursion train that has operated since 1999. It operates two trips in each direction on selected summer Sundays from Birmingham Snow Hill to Stratford-upon-Avon with a journey times of 60 to 70 minutes in each direction. The outbound journey operates via the North Warwickshire Line with the return using the Stratford to Leamington and Chiltern Main Lines.

It is operated by Vintage Trains, with traction generally supplied by Tyseley Locomotive Works although locomotives from elsewhere may be brought in on an as-required basis. As there are no turning locomotive facilities at Stratford-upon-Avon, the train operates with the locomotive running tender first in one direction.
