= Birmingham Moor Street railway station =

Railway station in the West Midlands, England

Birmingham Moor Street
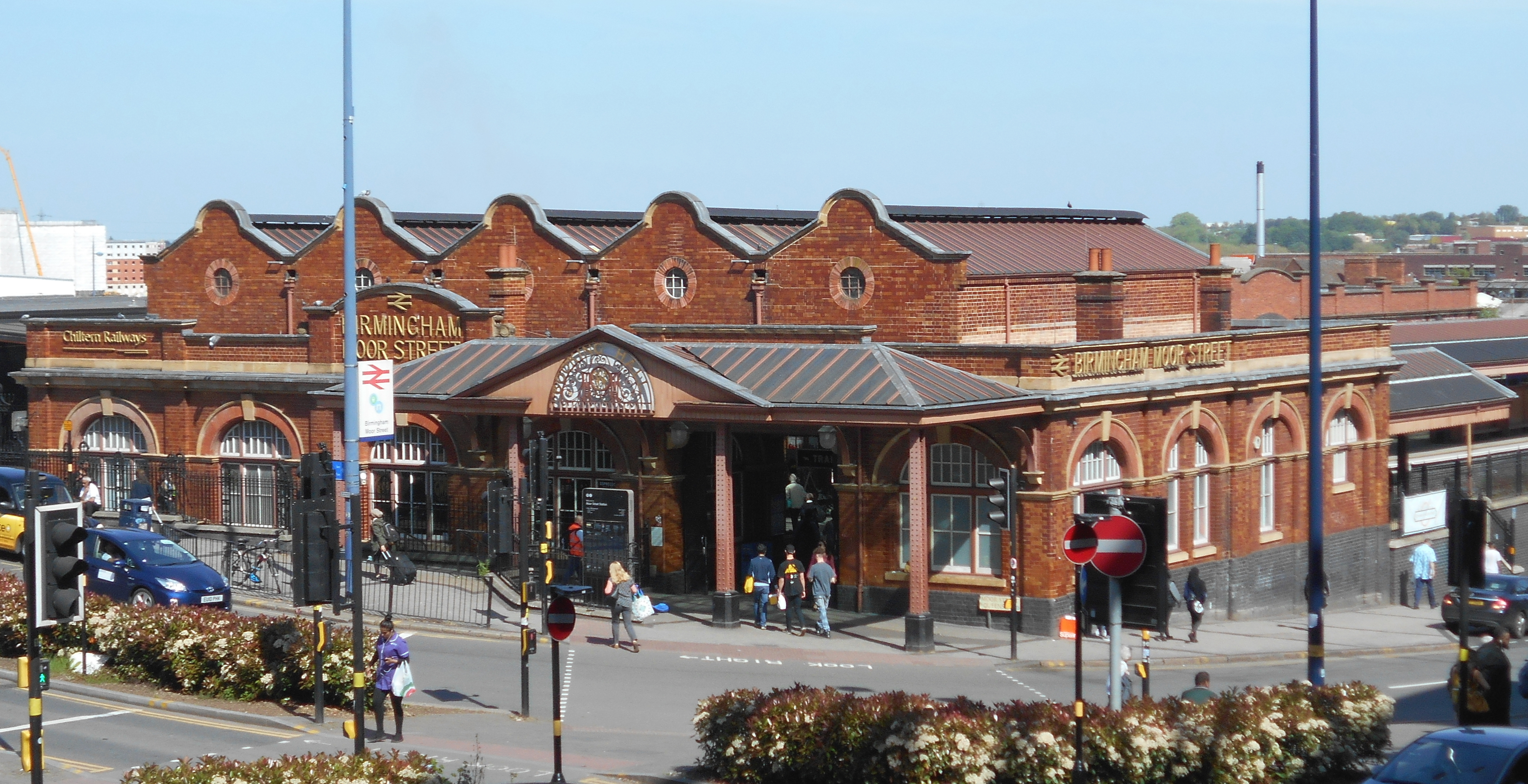
- The restored grade II listed exterior

General information
- Location: Birmingham, West Midlands, England
- Coordinates: 52.4787°N 1.8919°W
- Grid reference: SP074867
- Manager: Chiltern Railways
- Transit authority: Transport for West Midlands
- Platforms: 5 (4 in use)

Other information
- Station code: BMO
- Fare zone: 1
- Classification: DfT category B

Key dates
- 1909: Opened
- 1914: Current buildings completed
- 1987: Station relocated; through platforms opened, terminal platforms closed.
- 2002: Renovated
- 2010: Two terminal platforms reopened.

Passengers
- 2021/22: ▲4.384 million
- Interchange: ▲0.184 million
- 2022/23: ▲5.526 million
- Interchange: ▲0.335 million
- 2023/24: ▲6.417 million
- Interchange: ▲0.401 million
- 2024/25: ▲7.148 million
- Interchange: ▲0.448 million
- 2025/26: ▲7.435 million
- Interchange: ▲0.463 million
Location
Notes
- Passenger statistics from the Office of Rail and Road

Birmingham Moor Street, also known as Moor Street station, is one of three main railway stations in the city centre of Birmingham, in the West Midlands, England; the other two are New Street and Snow Hill.

Today's Moor Street station is a combination of the original station, opened in 1909 by the Great Western Railway as a terminus for local trains, and a newer Moor Street station with through platforms, a short distance from the original, which opened in 1987. The two were combined into one station in 2002, when the original was reopened and restored; the newer station was rebuilt in a matching style.

The station has become more important in recent years; two of the original platforms were reopened in 2010 and the station is now a northern terminus of many Chiltern Railways services on the Chiltern Main Line to London Marylebone, as well as being an important stop for local services on the Snow Hill Lines. It is now the second busiest railway station in Birmingham.

== History ==
=== Earlier history (1909–1987) ===
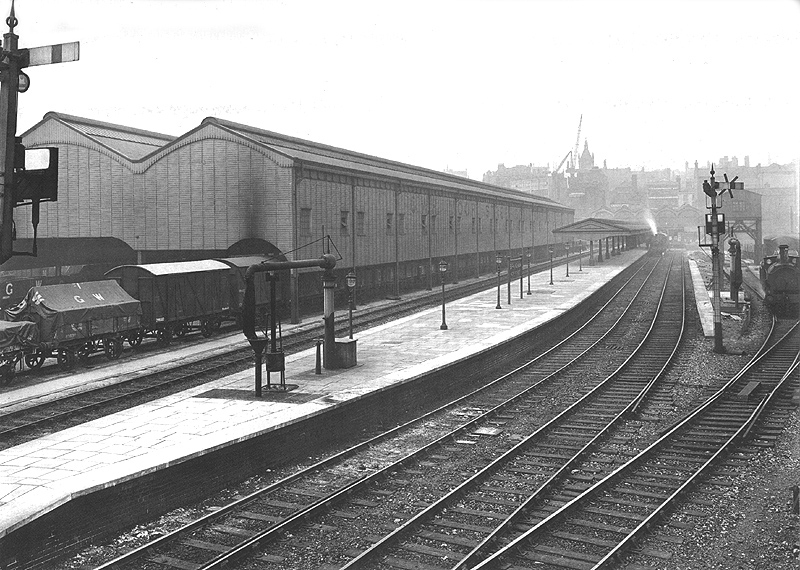
Moor Street station in 1915, from end of the platform, looking back towards the city centre, with the goods shed to the left

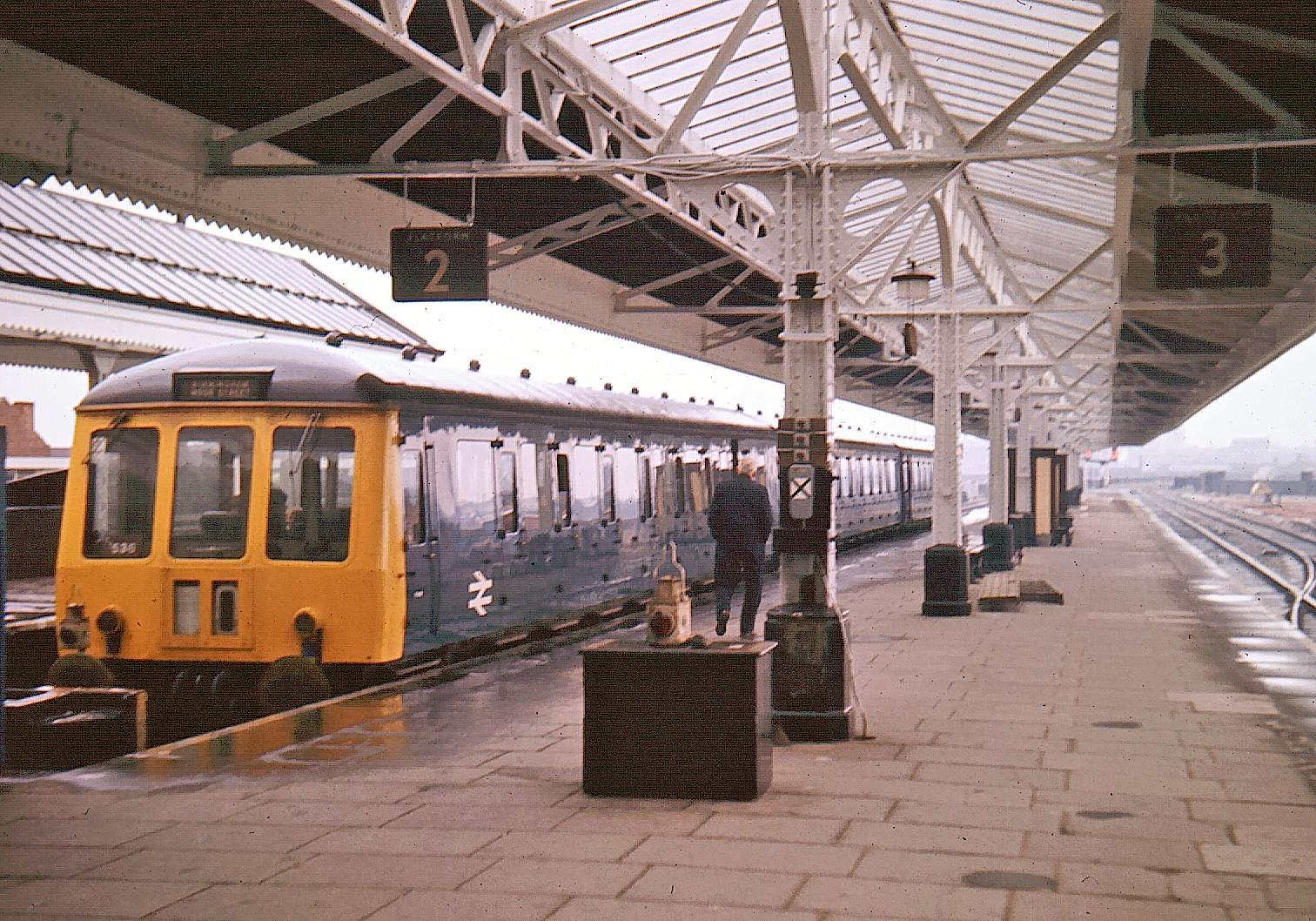
A local train waits at the terminus platforms, 1975

At the turn of the 20th century, suburban rail traffic into Birmingham was growing rapidly. The Great Western Railway (GWR) greatly expanded their facilities in the city at that time to cope with the demands. Snow Hill station, their main station in Birmingham, was extensively rebuilt and expanded. However, the twin tracked Snow Hill tunnel, which ran underneath the city centre into Snow Hill from the south, did not have enough capacity to accommodate all of the traffic, and widening the tunnel was considered impractical. In order to solve the capacity problem therefore, Moor Street station was built at the opposite end of the tunnel to take terminating local trains from the south and relieve traffic.

It was a terminus for local trains from Leamington Spa and local trains from Stratford-upon-Avon, via the recently opened North Warwickshire Line. It was opened with temporary buildings in July 1909, and the permanent buildings were completed in 1914. The station was located south of the entrance to Snow Hill tunnel, at the end of a short branch (the Moor Street branch) which connected the station to the main line. It originally had a single 700 feet (210 m)-long island platform with two platform faces. A third side platform, 600 feet (180 m) long was added in 1930. The through tracks to Snow Hill running alongside, however, were not provided with platforms.

The station was equipped with two electrically operated traversers at the buffer end of the platforms, as a space saving measure (given its confined site) in order to allow locomotives to move sideways between tracks, instead of having to reverse through crossovers. The traversers were removed from service in 1967, when all services to the station switched to diesel multiple unit operation.

Trains only used Moor Street during Mondays to Saturdays; on Sundays, Snow Hill station was quiet enough to allow trains to terminate there instead.

In 1948, upon nationalisation, Moor Street came under the control of the Western Region of British Railways, transferring to the London Midland Region, in 1963.

Snow Hill station was run down during the late 1960s and, on 4 March 1968, the line between the junction with the Moor Street branch and Birmingham Snow Hill, including Snow Hill tunnel closed, leaving Moor Street as an isolated terminus for local trains. Moor Street itself came under threat of closure in 1969, however five local authorities objected and took the case to the High Court, which sided with the local authorities, preventing closure.

From 1967 until the mid-1970s, Moor Street was at its lowest ebb; the infrequent local trains used the station during peak hours only, at other times they ran to and from New Street. In the 1970s, local services from the station came under the control of the West Midlands Passenger Transport Executive (WMPTE), under whose auspices service frequencies were improved. From 1975, a regular interval half hourly service was introduced between Moor Street and Dorridge and Shirley.

==== Goods station ====
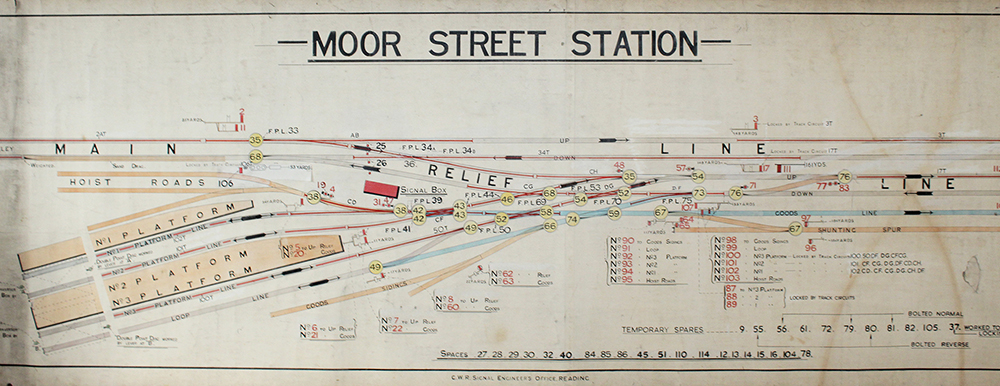
Part of a 1922 GWR signalling diagram. The through line from Snow Hill (to the left) is at the top, the goods station at the bottom and the passenger platforms in the middle.

Moor Street was originally provided with a large goods station situated adjacent to the passenger station, which opened in 1914. The GWR purchased and demolished a number of buildings, including the old Public Office to make way for it. It was built using the increasingly rare Hennebique technique for reinforced concrete. The goods station handled many goods trains which would otherwise have passed through Snow Hill tunnel to the GWR's goods depot at Hockley. Because it was built in a confined space on a steep gradient, the goods station was built on two levels, with one high level, and two low level sheds. Three wagon lifts were provided to transfer wagons to and from the low level sheds. The low level sheds were equipped with electric traversers to move wagons between the lifts and sidings where they would be loaded and unloaded.

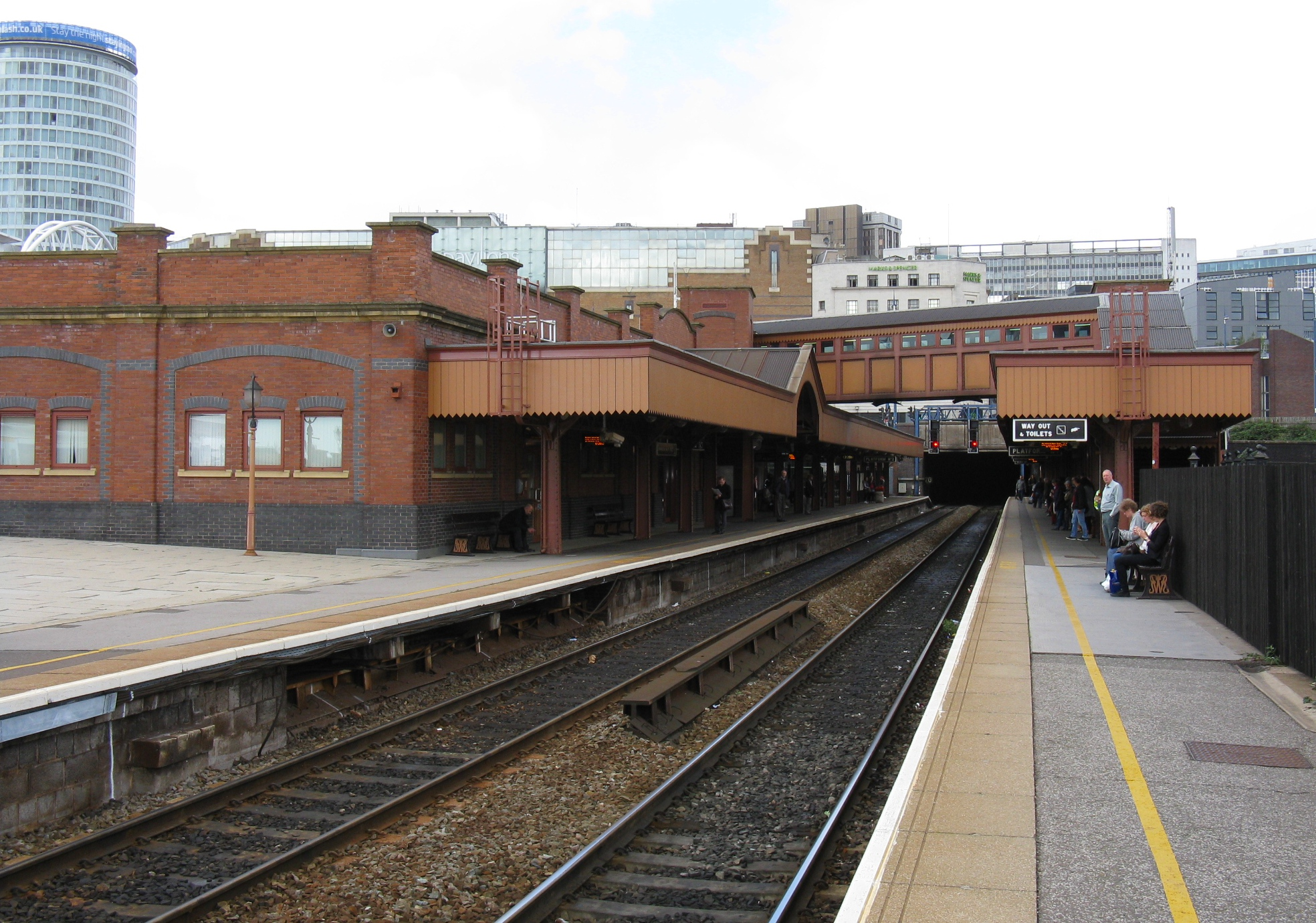
The two through platforms 1 and 2, looking towards Snow Hill tunnel. These were opened in 1987, but were given a makeover in the 2000s to match the style of the original station

A major source of traffic at the goods station was fresh fruit and vegetables, which would arrive at the station in the mornings, and be taken straight to the nearby market in the Bull Ring. The goods station was finally closed on 6 November 1972, and the main high-level shed was demolished three years later. The site of the former goods station is now partly occupied by the Selfridges building, and some of the former low-level goods sheds are now used as a car-park.

=== Relocation ===
In the mid-1980s, funding became available to reopen a station at Birmingham Snow Hill, along with Snow Hill tunnel. As part of the reopening scheme, a new Moor Street station with through platforms was built at the southern portal of the restored tunnel. On completion of this project, the original Moor Street terminus became redundant, and closed down. The final train, on 26 September 1987, was a steam special hauled by a locomotive from Birmingham Railway Museum, Clun Castle. The old platforms were disconnected from the network and the new through station came into use on 5 October 1987.

In the 1990s, the range of services stopping at Moor Street were expanded for the first time since it opened. In 1993, limited stop Network SouthEast services were introduced from London Marylebone to Snow Hill, via Banbury and Leamington Spa, making Moor Street a main line station for the first time. This service was taken over by Chiltern Railways following privatisation. In 1995, the completion of the Jewellery Line project north of Snow Hill, meant that through services to Worcester Shrub Hill, via Stourbridge Junction and Kidderminster, were introduced.

=== Restoration ===
The original station was not demolished, but was mothballed and allowed to deteriorate. By the late 1990s, the former platforms were overgrown and dilapidated, and cracks in the wall were visible from the road side, including some caused by the impact of a runaway bus. In March 1988, the Moor Street Station Historical Society was formed to "Save Our Station". Dr Bernard Juby, a medical practitioner from nearby Yardley, became its chairman and immediately set about campaigning for the station and its warehousing to be listed. Large teams of volunteers met each weekend to clean and preserve the various buildings. The existing artefacts were carefully renovated and stored; they were subsequently reused when the station reopened to the public.

As a result of their efforts, the old station became Grade II listed in 1998. The inspector from English Heritage had visited the site in 1988 and agreed that both station and warehouses should be listed; however, it took a further ten years and (with the help of councillors Sir Stan Yapp and Fred Chapman) a 14,500+ signature petition to Birmingham City Council before the Secretary of State signed it off.

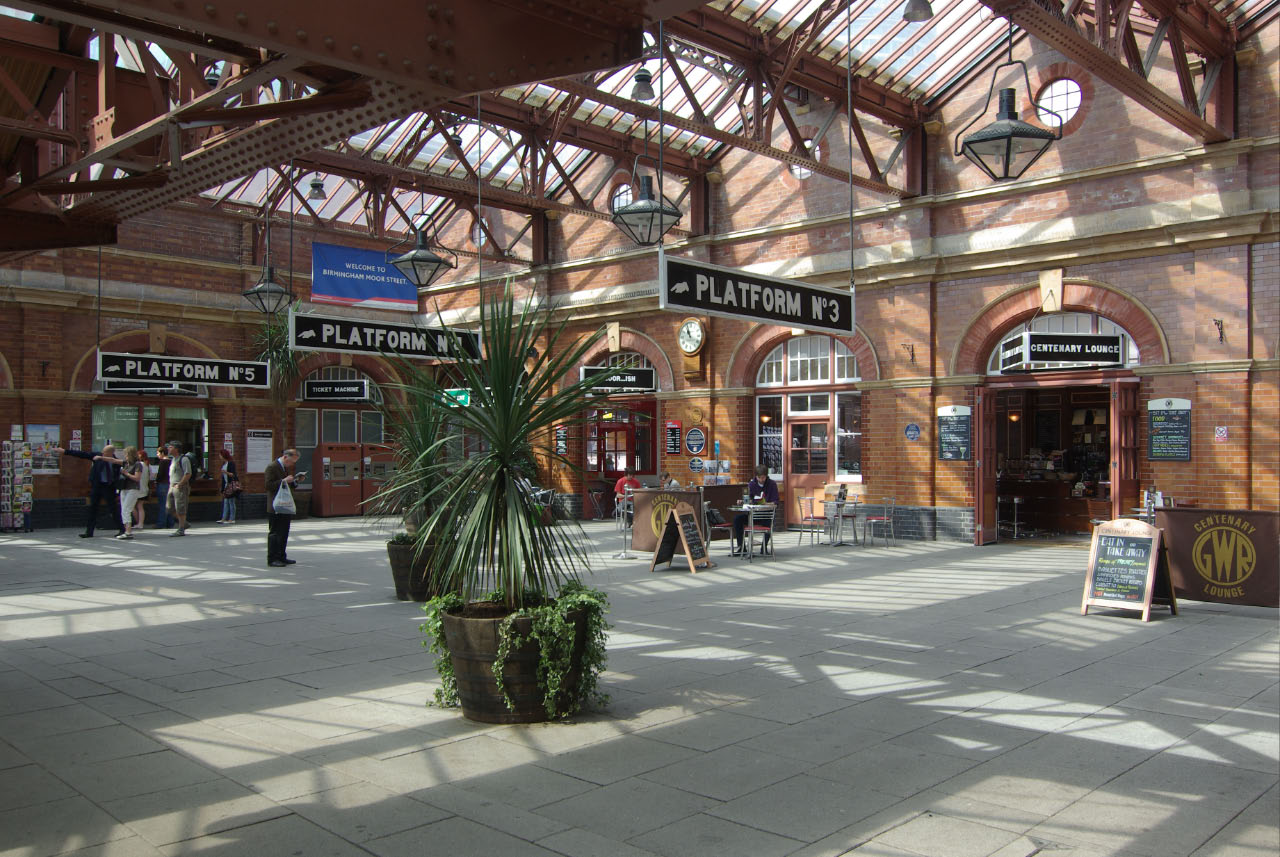
The station entrance concourse, as redeveloped in 2010

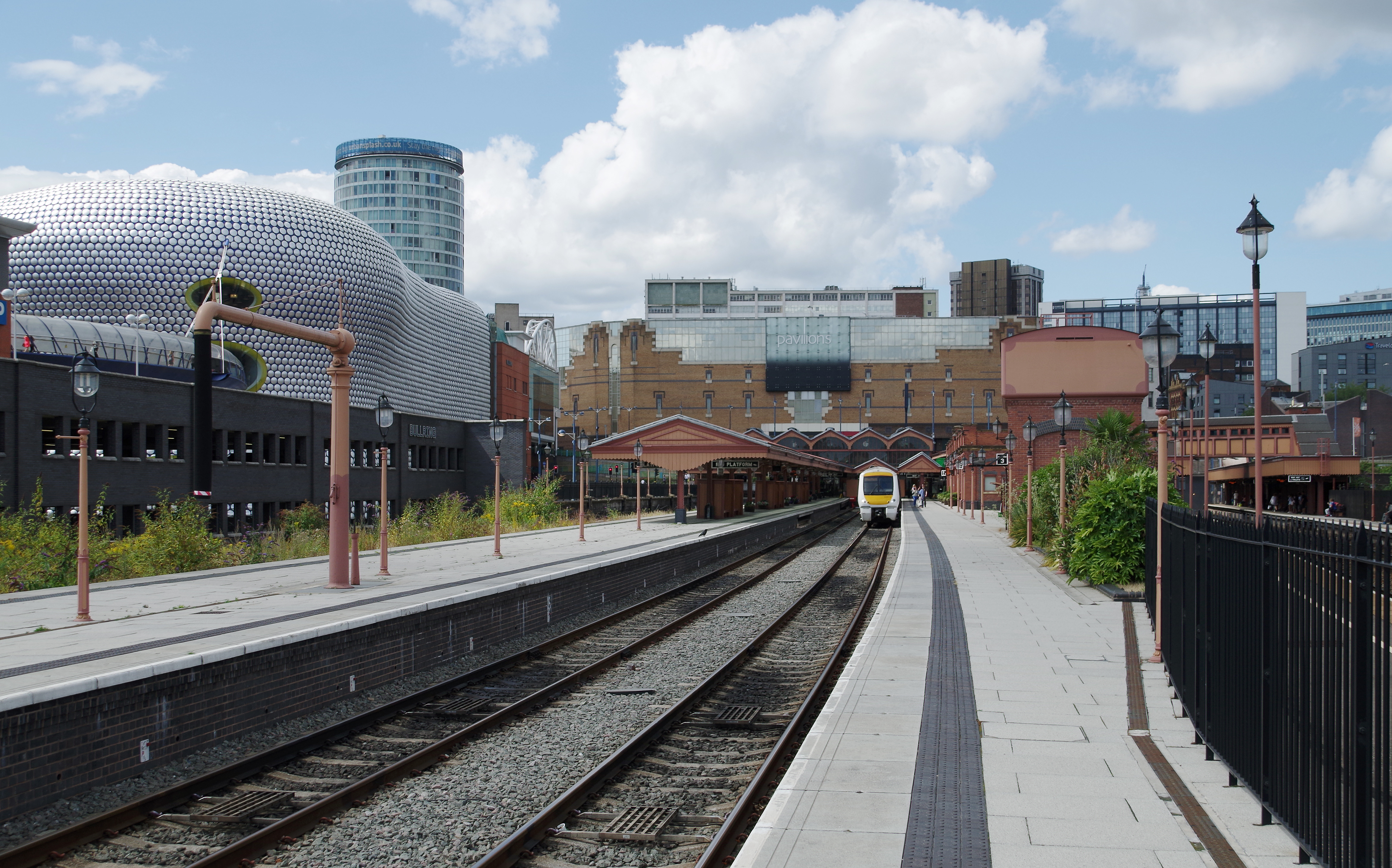
A Chiltern Railways Class 168 stands in the newly-reopened terminus platform 3

In the 2000s, the growth in services on the Snow Hill Lines again strained capacity through Snow Hill tunnel; Chiltern Railways and the Birmingham Alliance decided to restore the original terminus and reopen it, to allow some services to terminate there rather than Snow Hill. Between 2002 and 2003, the original Moor Street station building and platforms were renovated and restored to a 1930s style at a cost of £11 million. However, there was a long delay before the old terminal platforms were connected to the network and opened for service; this was because of delays in carrying out the necessary signalling work by Network Rail. Two of the three former terminal platforms, numbered 3 and 4, were reopened for use on 11 December 2010. The third bay platform 5 remains disused.

The restoration project also unified the original station and the 1980s station; the latter's station entrance was demolished, and a new passenger access was created to the through platforms using the old station's ticket hall. The footbridge and canopies on the through platforms were also rebuilt to match the style of the original station.

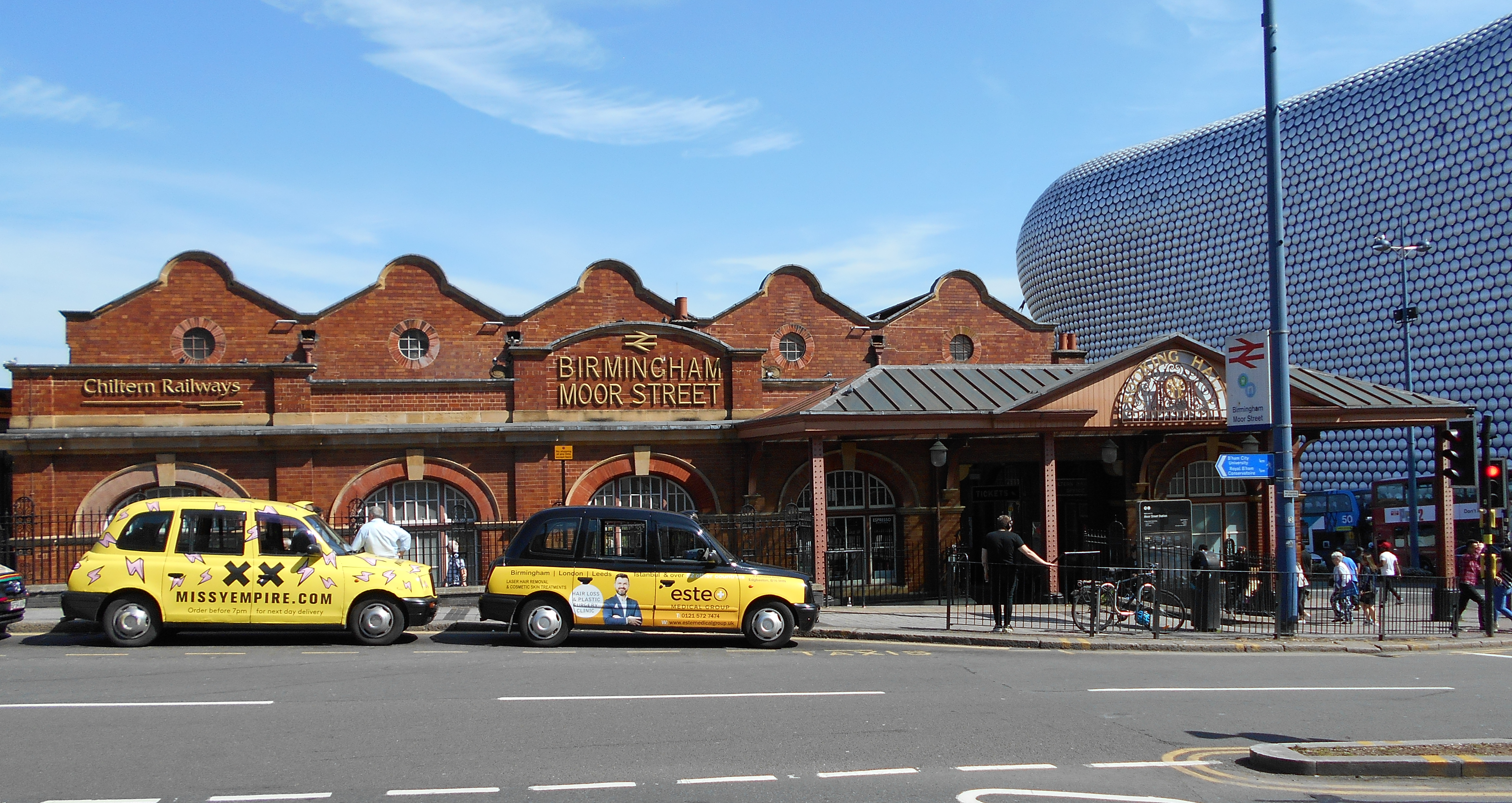
Station frontage with gilt signage, and canopy, added during restoration. The arched booking hall sign is from the old Snow Hill station

Refurbished in 1930s style, the station has reproduction lamps, clock, seating and signage. The renovation won the Railway Heritage Trust award for 2004 and The Birmingham Civic Society's Renaissance Award for 2005. The station became home to the cosmetically restored second GWR 2884 Class 2-8-0 no. 2885 which, until its removal on 4 June 2013, stood in the disused platform five. Further renovations during 2011–12 included the installation of GWR-inspired gilt signage on the front and side elevations of the station building.

Since the December 2010 timetable change, two of the three south-facing bay platforms at Moor Street station are now connected to the network and in use; this enabled some of the Chiltern services to and from London Marylebone to terminate at Moor Street, instead of Snow Hill. Local Chiltern stopping services to Leamington Spa will also begin and terminate at the new terminal platforms. Chiltern Railways are engaged in a large-scale redevelopment of their route from London Marylebone to Birmingham, with improvements to allow higher speeds.

An express service between Moor Street and London Marylebone was introduced on 5 September 2011, using locomotive-hauled coaches, furthering the competition with Virgin Trains' West Coast Main Line services from Birmingham New Street.

== Services ==
Moor Street is served by two train operating companies, which provide the following general off-peak services in trains per hour (tph):

Chiltern Railways: On the Chiltern Main Line

- 2 tph to London Marylebone, via Solihull, Dorridge, Warwick Parkway, Warwick, Leamington Spa, Banbury and Bicester North
- 1 tp2h to Leamington Spa via Solihull, Dorridge, Lapworth, Warwick Parkway and Warwick.

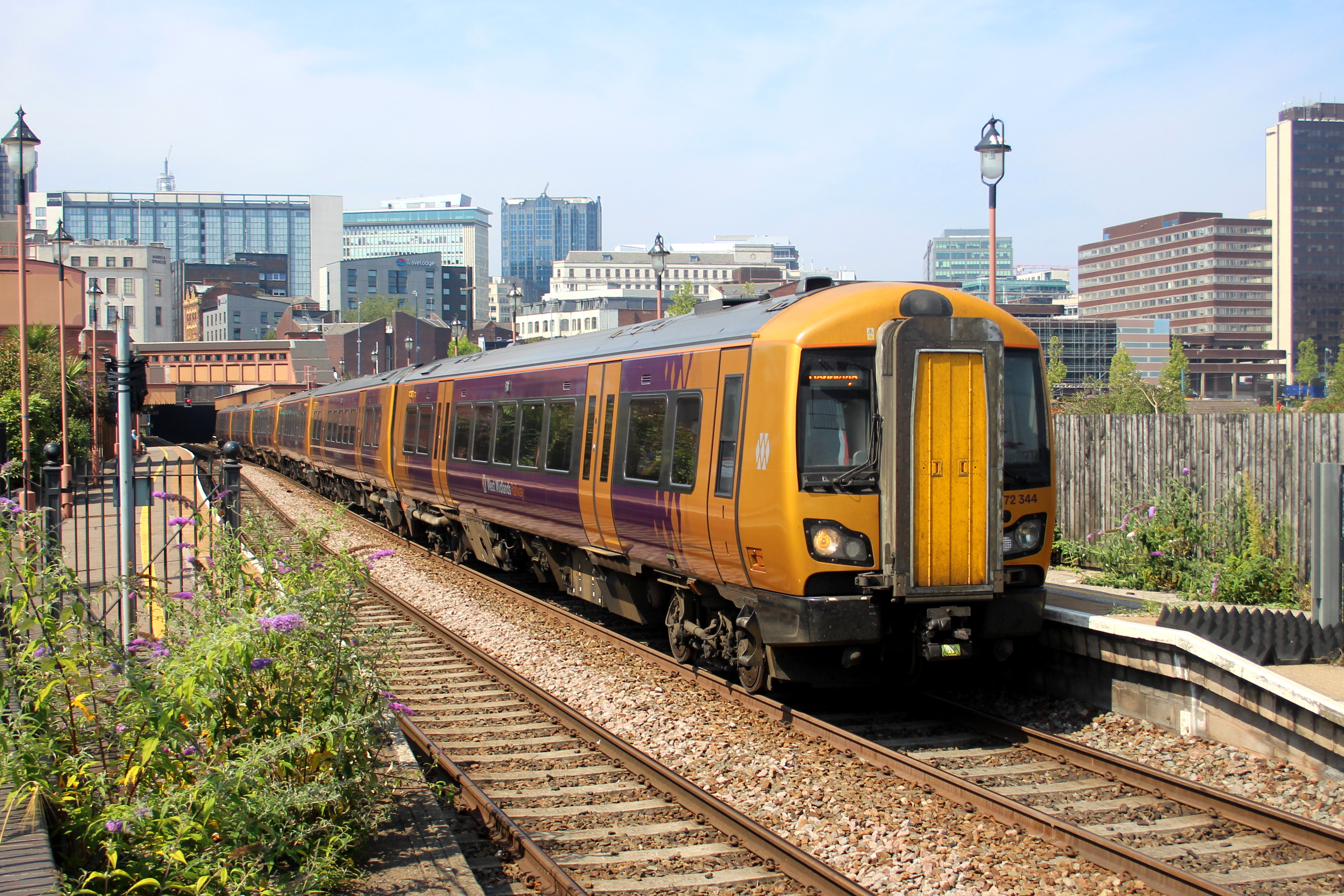
A Class 172 at the station

West Midlands Railway: On the Snow Hill Lines

- 2 tph to Whitlocks End, via Shirley; of which:
  - 1 tph continues to Stratford-upon-Avon, via the North Warwickshire Line
- 2 tph to Dorridge, via Solihull; of which:
  - 1 tph continues to Stratford-upon-Avon, via Lapworth
- 4 tph to Kidderminster; of which:
  - 1 tph continues to Worcester Foregate Street.

On summer Sundays, Moor Street is often used by steam locomotive-hauled heritage services, operated by Vintage Trains.

Preceding station	National Rail	Following station
Birmingham Snow Hill	Chiltern Railways; Chiltern Main Line	Solihull
Terminus	Chiltern Railways; Chiltern Main Line	Solihull
Birmingham Snow Hill	West Midlands Railway; Leamington/Stratford-Worcester	Bordesley
Birmingham Snow Hill	West Midlands Railway; Leamington/Stratford-Worcester	Small Heath
	Heritage railways	
Birmingham Snow Hill	Vintage Trains; The Shakespeare Express; July–September	Tyseley

== Links to New Street station ==
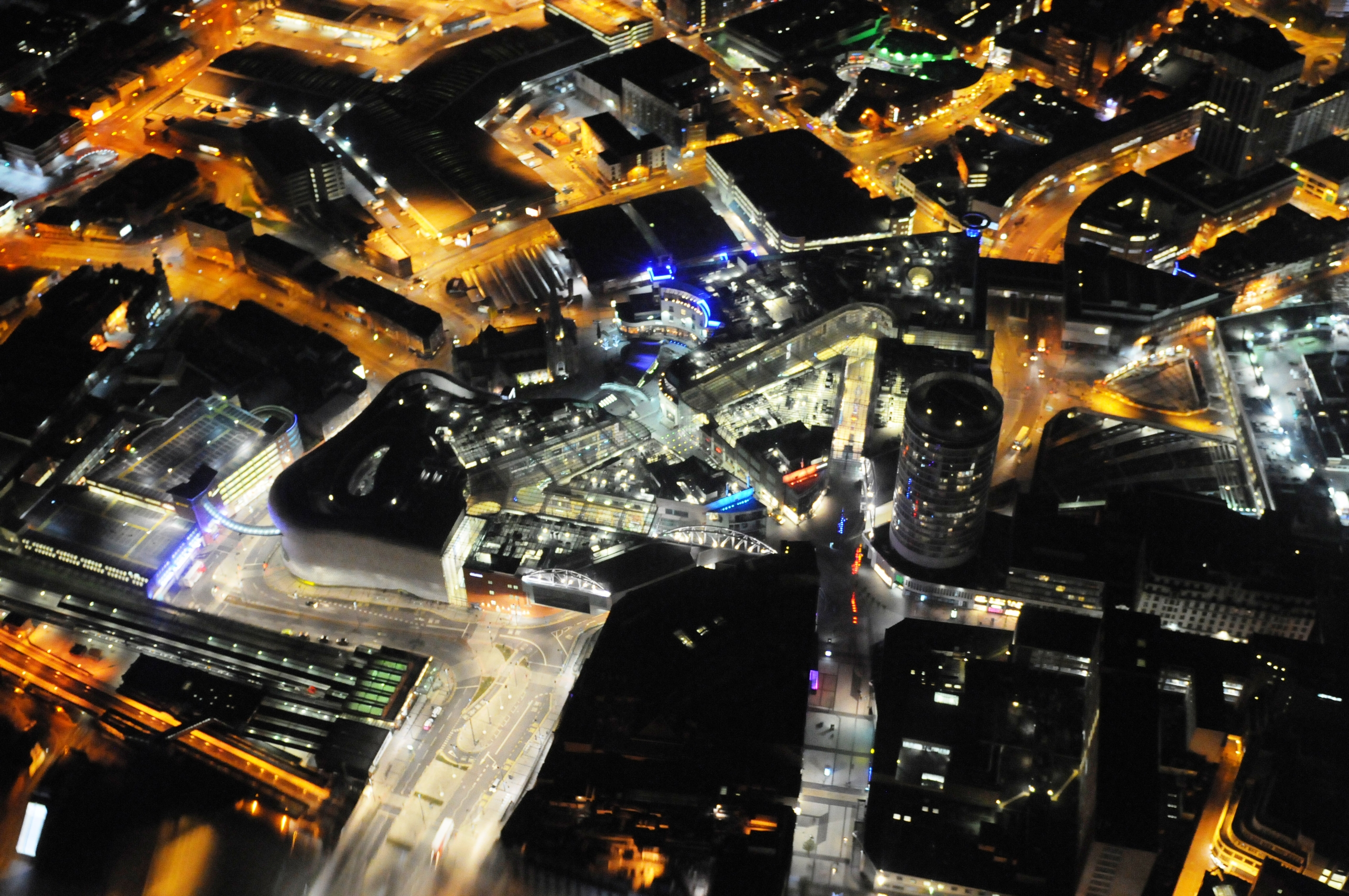
Night-time aerial view, showing Moor Street (bottom left) and New Street (centre right) stations, separated by the Bull Ring shopping centre

Moor Street lies 400 yards (370 m) away from New Street, the city's main railway station. There is a signposted route for passengers travelling between the two stations, which involves a short walk through a tunnel under the Bull Ring shopping centre. Although the railway lines into New Street pass directly underneath Moor Street, there is no track connection. In 2013, a new direct walkway was opened between the two stations making interchange easier.

In April 2026, an extension to the West Midlands Metro opened, with a new stop at Albert Street serving Moor Street. Trams from there alternate between services to Wolverhampton and Edgbaston, with the latter including a stop at New Street Station.

== Proposed future developments ==
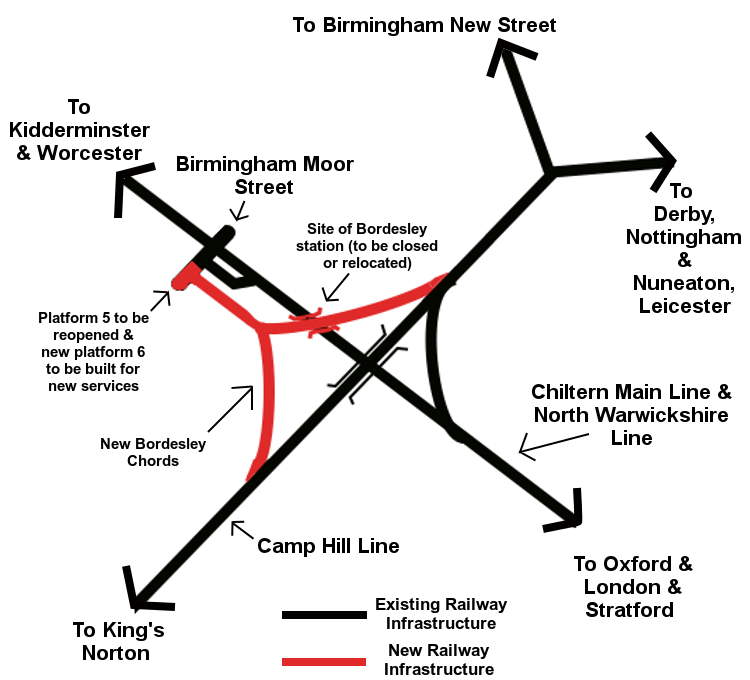
Simplified diagram of proposed Bordesley Chords. The existing infrastructure is in black, whilst the proposed new chords are illustrated in red.

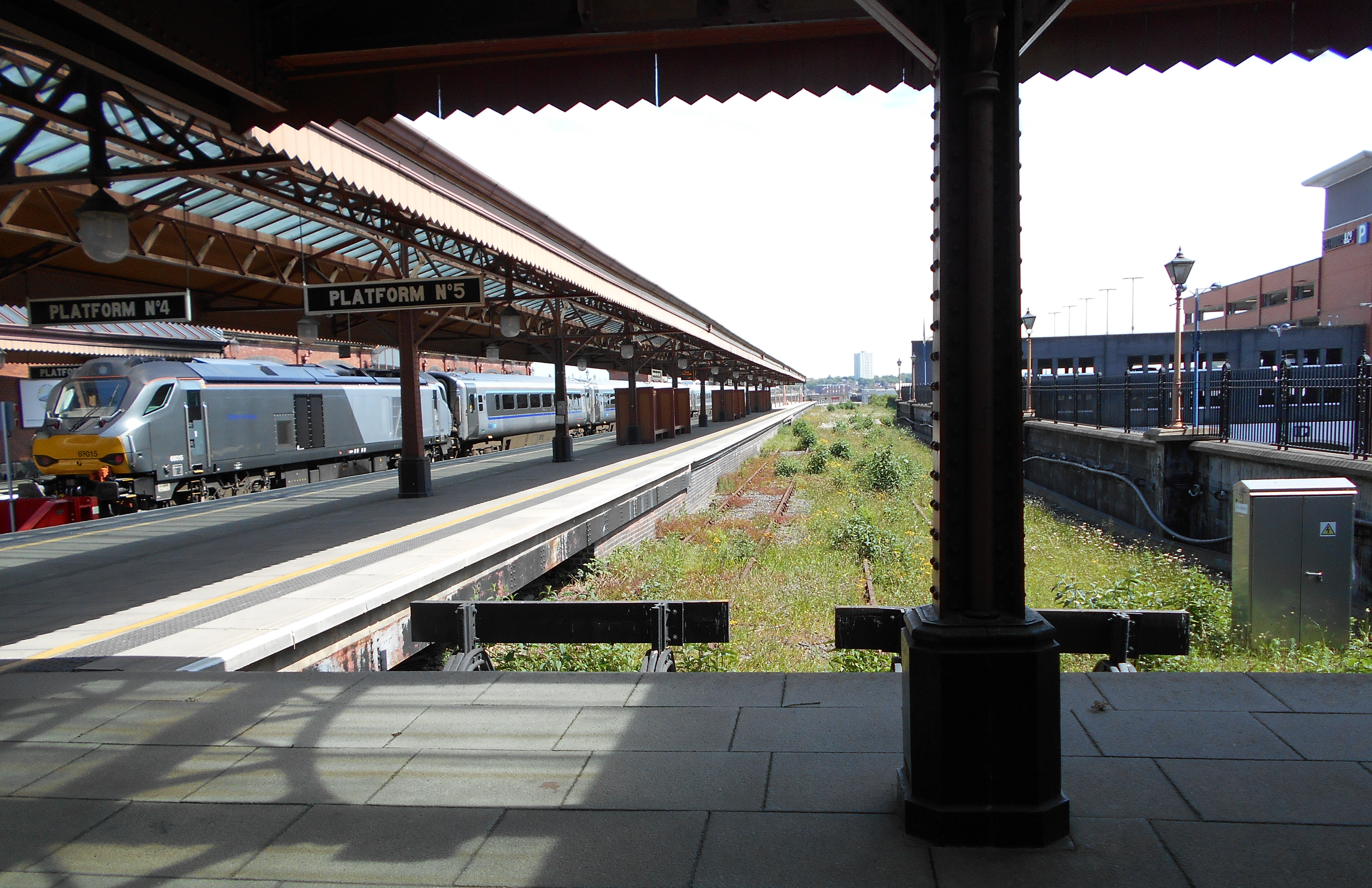
The disused bay platform 5 at Moor Street. If the Bordesley Chords go ahead, this platform will be reopened, with a new platform 6 alongside it.

Plans are being pursued to introduce new services into Moor Street by constructing new rail connections, known as the Bordesley chords linking the station to the Camp Hill line, which is served by freight, newly reinstated suburban passenger services and some long-distance CrossCountry trains. The new chords would run into Moor Street's terminus platforms, and would allow the new local passenger service south to Kings Norton, which includes newly reopened stations at Moseley Village, Kings Heath and Pineapple Road to run into Moor Street. This would also allow for new local services into Moor Street on the lines from Birmingham to Tamworth and Nuneaton, including a new station at Castle Bromwich. The currently disused third bay platform would be reopened (as platform 5) and an additional new fourth bay platform (platform 6) would be opened to accommodate the new services.

It was proposed that services to the South West (via Worcester) and the East Midlands (Nottingham and Leicester) would be rerouted into Moor Street from New Street, after the construction of the Camp Hill Chords.

In 2017, Network Rail predicted that the number of passengers using Moor Street would grow to 8.9 million per year by 2023, and then to over 12 million by 2043.

The High Speed 2 city centre terminus, Birmingham Curzon Street, is being built adjacent to Moor Street.

In March 2019, further plans were revealed including a new footbridge to link all six platforms with the planned HS2 station and the new platforms, ready for rerouting of services from the East Midlands, South West, Worcester and Hereford to Moor Street.

On 26 June 2019, plans were submitted to the Department for Transport to obtain funding for the £2 billion investment programme known as the Midlands Rail Hub. The plans included:

- two new platforms (5 and 6)
- two extra trains per hour (tph) to Leicester and Derby
- two extra commuter tph from Kings Norton via the Camp Hill line
- one extra tph to Nottingham
- one extra tph to Hereford, via Worcester
- one extra tph to Cardiff Central
- one extra tph to Bristol Temple Meads.

== See also ==
- Transport in Birmingham
- Transport for West Midlands
