= Shirley railway station (England) =

Railway station in Solihull, England

Shirley
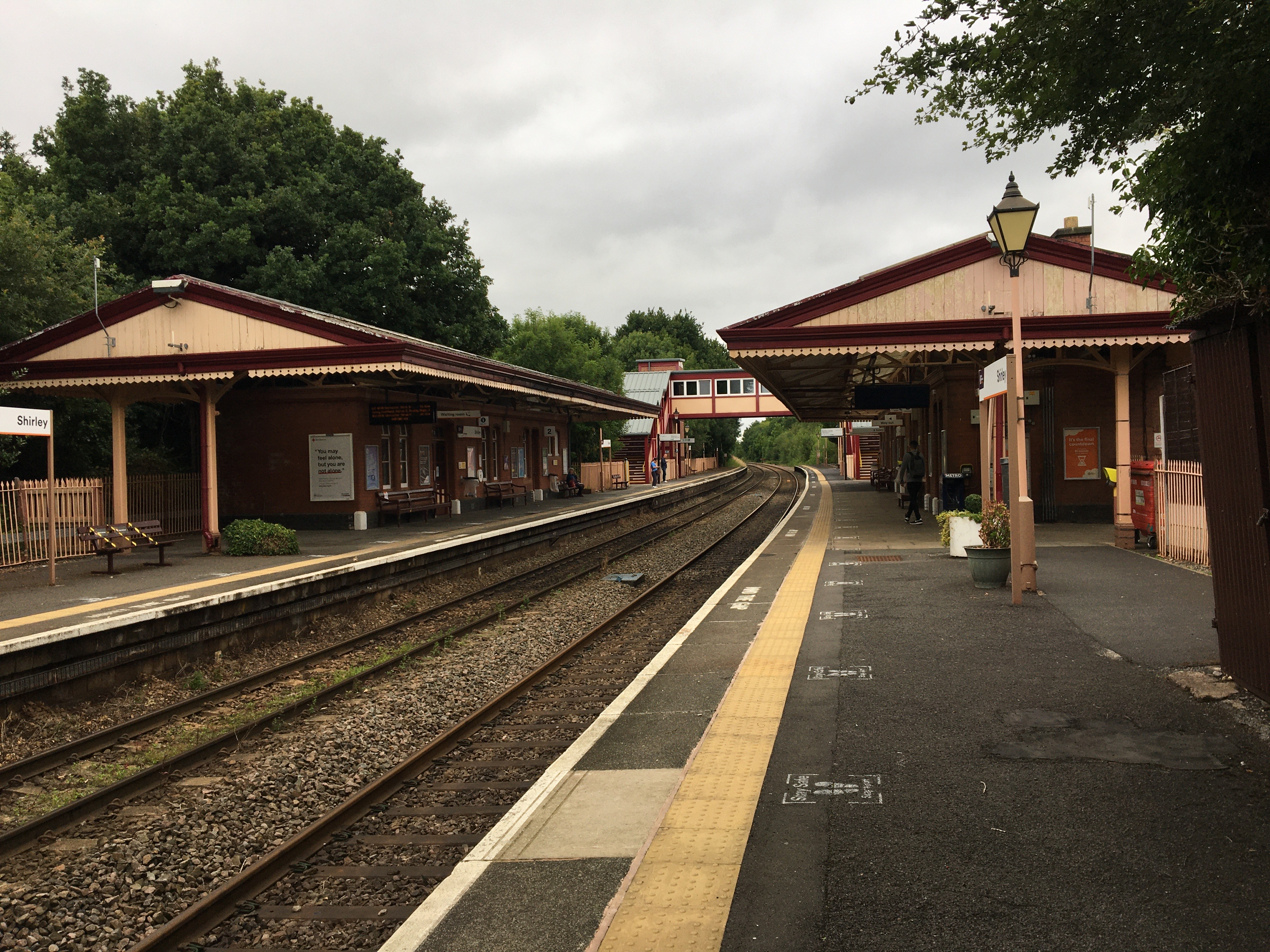
- Shirley railway station in 2020

General information
- Location: Shirley, Solihull; England
- Coordinates: 52.403°N 1.845°W
- Grid reference: SP106783
- Manager: West Midlands Trains
- Transit authority: Transport for West Midlands
- Platforms: 2

Other information
- Station code: SRL
- Fare zone: 4
- Classification: DfT category E

History
- Opened: 1908

Passengers
- 2021/22: ▲0.210 million
- 2022/23: ▲0.247 million
- 2023/24: ▲0.280 million
- 2024/25: ▲0.315 million
- 2025/26: ▲0.363 million
Location
Notes
- Passenger statistics from the Office of Rail and Road

Shirley railway station serves the Shirley area of Solihull in the West Midlands of England. Situated on the North Warwickshire Line, the station, and all trains serving it, are operated by West Midlands Trains.

== History ==
The station was opened by the Great Western Railway on 1 June 1908, along with the line. It was considered an important station and was provided with substantial brick built buildings. The station was also provided with a goods yard and shed, which lasted until 1968.

Until October 2010, Shirley station was the terminus for many commuter services from Birmingham which did not run through to Stratford. These services were extended to terminate at the next station Whitlocks End, with the commissioning of a new turnback facility. This was done in order to alleviate traffic congestion at Shirley station, by encouraging commuters to drive to Whitlocks End, which had space for proper park and ride facilities. The 1907 built signalbox that stood on the Stratford-upon-Avon bound platform became redundant, and was demolished at the end of 2010, despite a local campaign to see its retention.

== Services ==
As of December 2023 the service pattern at Shirley is as follows:

- 2 trains per hour westbound to Kidderminster via Birmingham Moor Street, Snow Hill and Stourbridge Junction, with some evening trains continuing onward to Worcester.
- 2 trains per hour southbound to Whitlocks End, one of which continues to Stratford-upon-Avon.

On Sundays, there is an hourly service westbound to Worcester Foregate Street via Birmingham Snow Hill and southbound to Stratford-upon-Avon.

Preceding station	National Rail	Following station
Yardley Wood	West Midlands Railway; North Warwickshire Line	Whitlocks End
