= North Warwickshire Line =

North Warwickshire Line (Shakespeare Line)
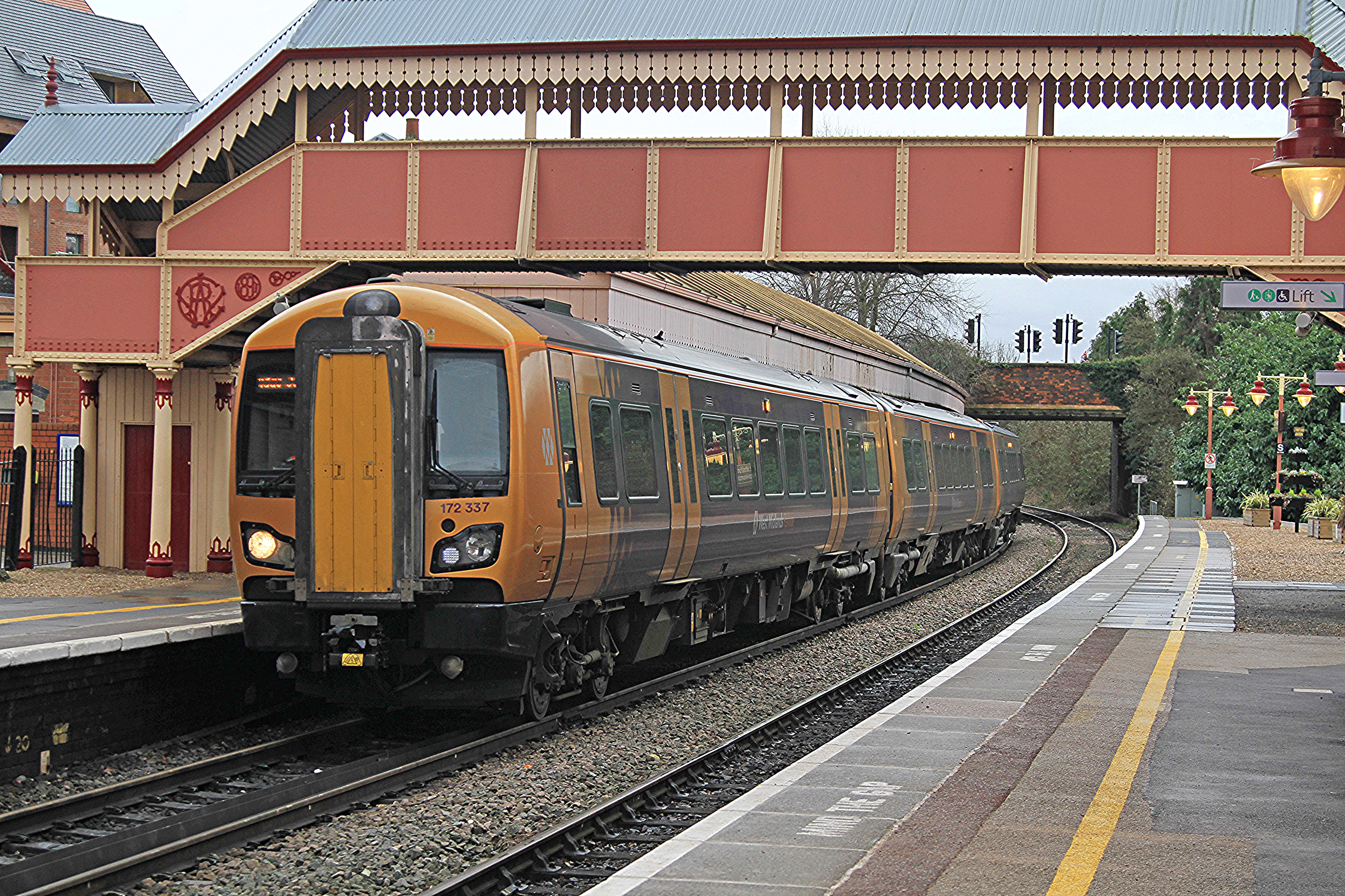
- A West Midlands Trains Class 172 at Stratford-upon-Avon station

Overview
- Status: Operational
- Owner: Network Rail
- Locale: Birmingham; Warwickshire; West Midlands; West Midlands (region)
- Stations: 20

Service
- Type: Suburban rail, Heavy rail
- System: National Rail

History
- Opened: 1908

Technical
- Track gauge: 1,435 mm (4 ft 8 1/2 in) standard gauge
Route map
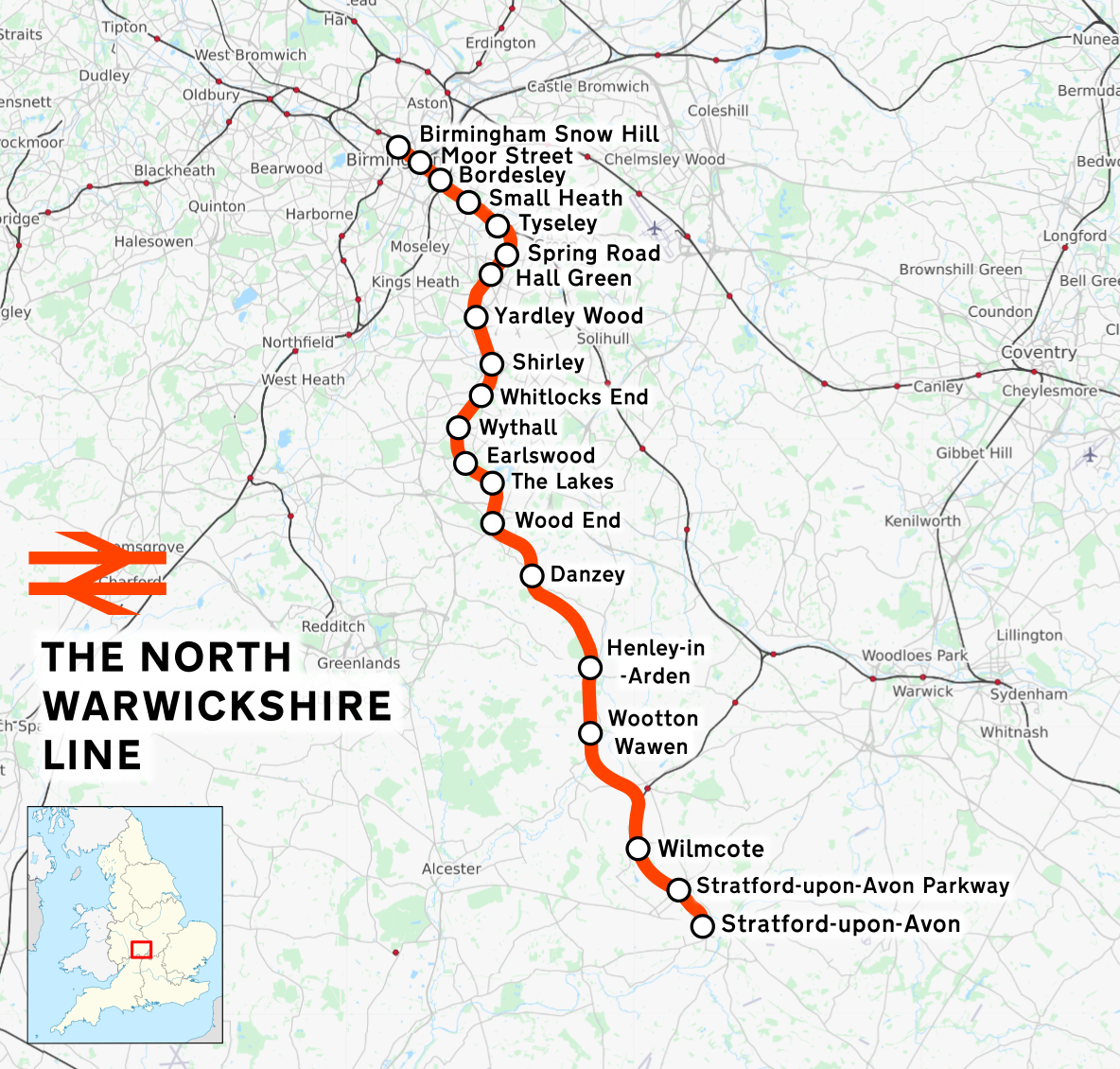
(Click to expand)

The North Warwickshire Line (also known as the Shakespeare Line) is a suburban railway line in the West Midlands region of the United Kingdom. It runs from Birmingham to Stratford-upon-Avon, Warwickshire, now the southern terminus of the line, although until 1976 the line continued to Cheltenham as part of the Great Western Railway route from Birmingham to Bristol.

The line is one of the Snow Hill lines. It is not electrified and is operated by West Midlands Trains using Class 172 diesel multiple units.

The northern part of the line is suburban in nature, and has a regular and busy commuter service into central Birmingham. The southern part (south of Whitlocks End) is rural in nature, and has a less frequent service, with a number of rural stations.

Despite the name, the line does not pass through the area commonly known as North Warwickshire, instead, the name of the line was believed to be derived from that of the local hunt.

== History ==
=== Early history ===
Birmingham, North Warwickshire, and Stratford-upon-Avon Railway Act 1894
- Act of Parliament
- Parliament of the United Kingdom
- Long title: An Act for making a Railway from Birmingham to Stratford-upon-Avon and for other purposes.
- Citation: 57 & 58 Vict. c. ccxi

Dates
- Royal assent: 25 August 1894

Text of statute as originally enacted

The original plans for the line were promoted by an independent company; the Birmingham, North Warwickshire and Stratford Railway, which received royal assent for its authorising act of Parliament, the Birmingham, North Warwickshire, and Stratford-upon-Avon Railway Act 1894 (57 & 58 Vict. c. ccxi) in August 1894. The company failed to raise the necessary funds to build the line, and the powers to build it were taken over by the Great Western Railway (GWR) in July 1900. The GWR incorporated the line into their own scheme to build a new Birmingham to Cheltenham via Stratford main line. Construction began in September 1905, the line was opened to goods traffic on 9 December 1907, and to passengers on 1 July 1908.

The NWL connected to the existing main line into Birmingham at Tyseley, and ran south to Bearley, where it connected to the pre-existing single track Hatton to Stratford-upon-Avon branch line, which had been opened in 1860 by the Stratford on Avon Railway. Part of this branch between Bearley and Stratford was doubled as part of the work, to incorporate it into the new main line, providing a more direct link between Birmingham and Stratford, connecting Henley-in-Arden and Shirley en route. This made redundant the existing branch line to Henley-in-Arden from Lapworth, which later closed in 1915. The NWL formed the final stage of a new main line route, which also incorporated most of the branch south of Stratford to Honeybourne, opened in 1859, which was also doubled at the same time, and joined to a new line from Honeybourne to Cheltenham (the Honeybourne Line), which had been completed in 1906. This gave the GWR a new main line between the West Midlands and the South West of England and South Wales, providing a shorter link than existing routes via Oxford and Hereford. It thus placed the Great Western in a position to compete with the Birmingham to Bristol route of the Midland Railway.

Moor Street station in Birmingham, was opened soon after the opening of the North Warwickshire Line, and served as the Birmingham terminus of most local services on the line, as well local services from Leamington Spa. Moor Street was opened to take these local services and so, relieve congestion at Birmingham Snow Hill which handled the long-distance services. Local services were operated initially by railmotors; which were self-propelled steam carriages. These were later superseded by autotrains; a form of push-pull train.

From the start, the line carried long-distance services from the West Midlands to Bristol, South Wales, and the South West of England. These were suspended during the First World War, then developed in the 1920s and '30s, were suspended again in the Second World War, finally reaching their peak in the 1950s, at which time up to six such trains traversed the line each weekday. The doyen of these services was always the daily train from Wolverhampton to Penzance, latterly named "The Cornishman". The line was especially busy during summer months, as it became the principal holiday route between Birmingham and Devon and Cornwall, and many extra holiday excursion trains would run.

A pioneering diesel railcar service with a buffet commenced running in July 1934 between Birmingham Snow Hill and Cardiff, running non-stop through Stratford, with only two stops at Gloucester and Newport. This was the first long-distance diesel express service in Britain. It proved so successful that larger railcars with more seating and no buffet had to be introduced to cope with demand, and even this had to be augmented by a normal locomotive hauled service. During the Second World War, the railcar service was the only through service using the line, as all other long-distance trains were suspended. At this time it consisted of a three car train consisting of a standard carriage sandwiched between two railcars. Two such trains ran to and from Cardiff daily at this period, and a stop at Stratford was introduced.

The line passed into the ownership of British Railways in 1948, following nationalisation.

=== Cutbacks and closure attempts ===
The North Warwickshire Line has survived two attempts at closure. The line between Tyseley and Bearley junctions was listed for closure as part of the Beeching Axe closures in the 1960s. This would have left Stratford connected to the rail network only by the branch to Hatton, reverting to the pre-1908 situation. The closure proposals provoked a strong local campaign to save the line, which eventually went to the High Court, resulting in a court injunction preventing closure of the line in 1969. However British Rail made another attempt at closure in 1984, when they appealed to have the injunction lifted. This time the proposal was to close the line between Henley-in-Arden and Bearley junction, and to divert Stratford trains via Solihull. This again provoked a strong local response, and BR withdrew the closure proposal in 1987.

However many cutbacks were made. Long-distance services were cut back from September 1962, when the "Cornishman" and the Birmingham-Cardiff expresses were re-routed. A few passenger services remained south of Stratford to Gloucester until 1968, and to Worcester via Honeybourne until 1969. The line south of Stratford remained open for freight until 1976, when damage caused by a serious freight train derailment led to British Rail deciding to close the line entirely. The track was lifted in 1979, ending the North Warwickshire Line's role as a through main line.

=== Recent history ===
Since the 1990s, the line has been marketed as the 'Shakespeare Line'.

The line was resignalled by Network Rail in 2009/2011, replacing the semaphore signals in place, and improving platform access at Stratford; it also saw the removal of the three remaining signal boxes at Shirley, Henley-in-Arden and Bearley Junction. As part of this scheme, terminating services from Birmingham were extended from Shirley to the next station, Whitlocks End, by the addition of a new turnback facility. Park and ride facilities were added at Whitlocks End to encourage commuters to drive there, in order to reduce traffic congestion at Shirley station.

In 2011 a new fleet of Class 172 diesel multiple units was introduced to operate the line (along with the other Snow Hill Lines) replacing the older Class 150s which had operated the line since 1990.

In May 2013 Stratford-upon-Avon Parkway station was opened north of Stratford. This allows commuters to use the train without driving into Stratford.

== Current services ==
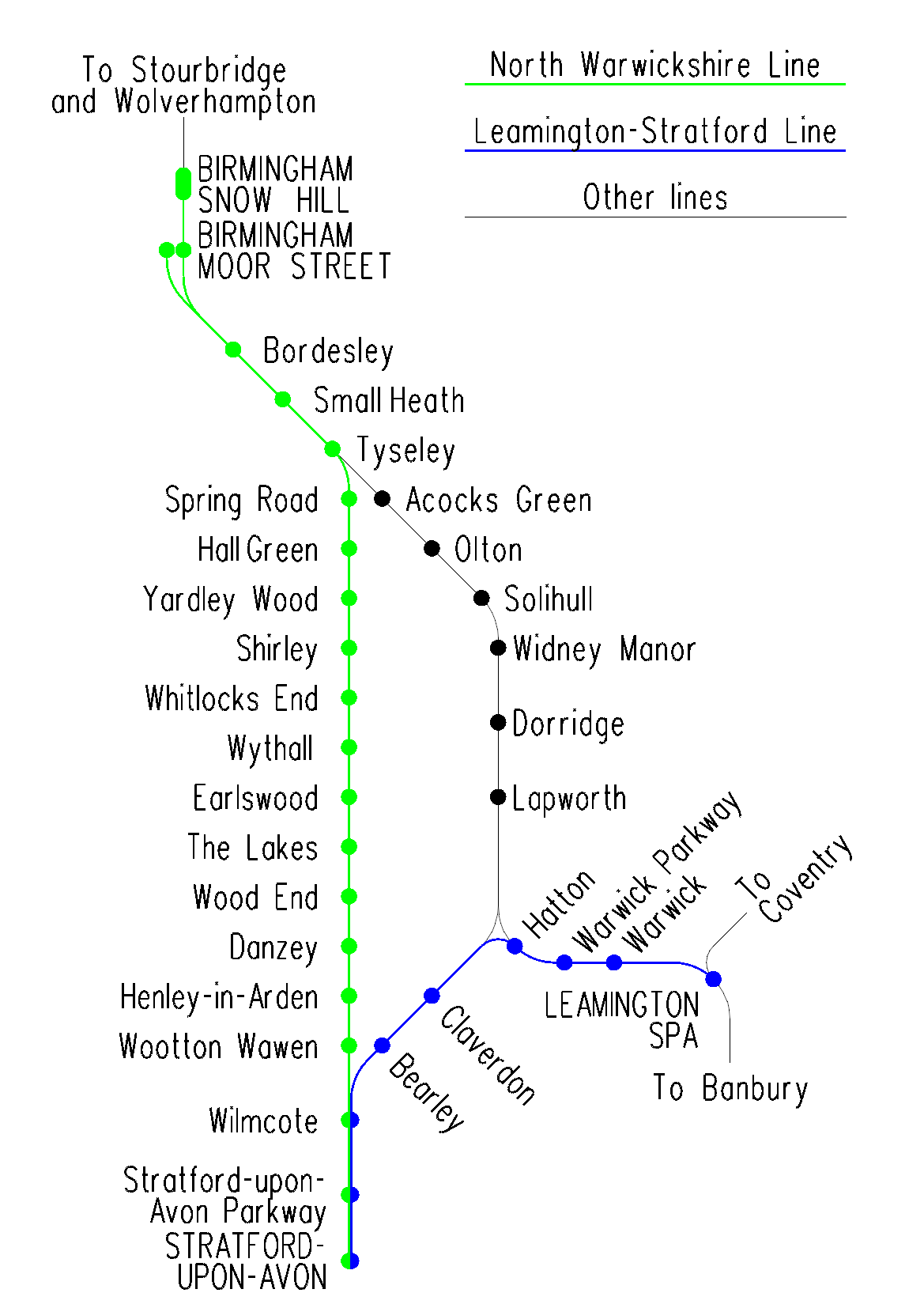
Diagram of the lines from Stratford

The current daytime service level, is two trains per hour between Birmingham Snow Hill and Whitlocks End, one of which continues to Stratford. A second hourly service between Birmingham and Stratford runs via Solihull, joining or leaving the North Warwickshire Line at Bearley Junction, meaning a half-hourly service exists between Birmingham and Stratford. Most Birmingham trains continue beyond Snow Hill to either Stourbridge Junction, Kidderminster or Worcester.

On summer Sundays, a steam service, the "Shakespeare Express" is operated by Vintage Trains between Birmingham and Stratford.

== Possible future development ==
The Shakespeare Line Promotion Group is promoting a scheme to reopen the 9 miles (14 km) of line south of Stratford to Honeybourne where it would link to the Cotswold Line. Called the "Avon Rail Link", the scheme (supported as a freight diversionary route by DB Schenker) would make Stratford-upon-Avon station a through station once again with improved connections to the South, and would open up the possibility of direct services to Oxford and Worcester via Evesham. The scheme faces local opposition. A plan asserted that there was a good business case for Stratford-Cotswolds link.

== See also ==
- Leamington–Stratford line
- Stratford-upon-Avon and Midland Junction Railway
