= Leamington–Stratford line =

Railway line in Warwickshire, England

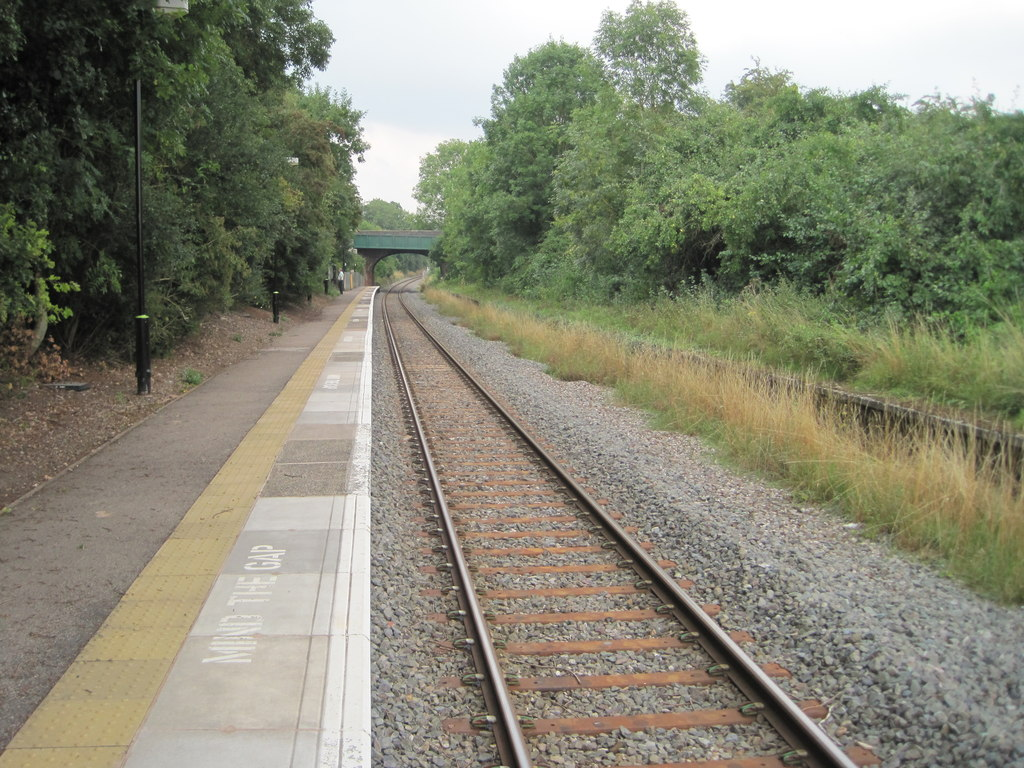
- Claverdon railway station, Warwickshire

Overview
- Owner: Network Rail
- Locale: Warwickshire; West Midlands (region)

Service
- Operator(s): Chiltern Railways; West Midlands Railway
- Rolling stock: Class 168

Technical
- Track gauge: 4 ft 8 1/2 in (1,435 mm) standard gauge
Route map
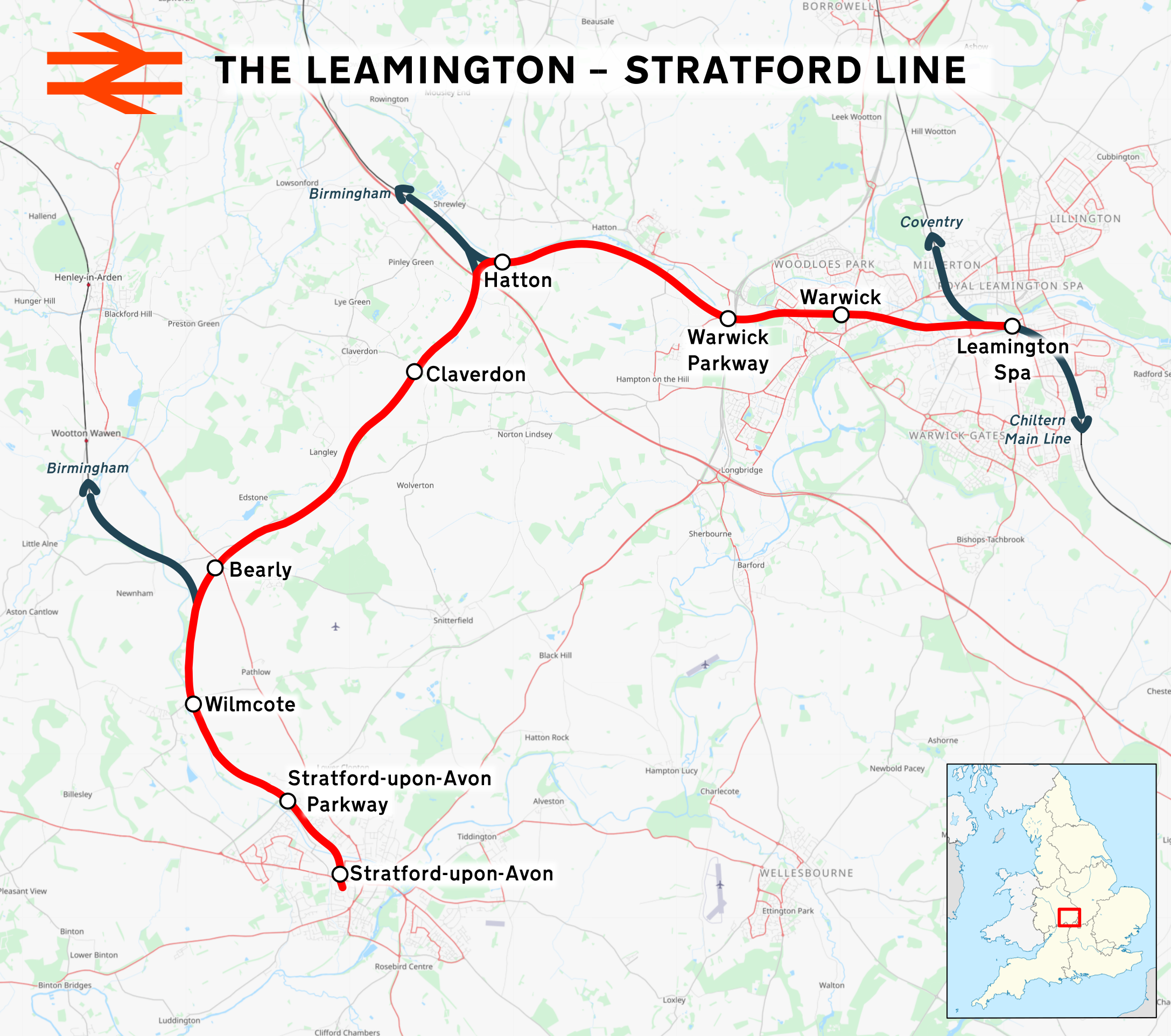
(Click to expand)

The Leamington–Stratford line is a railway line linking Leamington Spa and Stratford-upon-Avon in Warwickshire, England. It follows the Chiltern Main Line from Leamington Spa to Hatton before diverging to the south. It serves Stratford-upon-Avon, Wilmcote, Bearley, Claverdon, Hatton, Warwick, and Leamington Spa. At Wilmcote, it joins the North Warwickshire Line.

The section between Hatton and Wilmcote was opened in 1880, and doubled in 1939.

Passenger services are primarily operated by Chiltern Railways. They replaced the previous operator, First Great Western Link, in early 2005. Some services are operated by West Midlands Railway which run between Birmingham Snow Hill and Stratford-upon-Avon via Solihull.

== Rolling Stock ==
The line uses the Class 168.
