= Whitlocks End railway station =

Railway station in Whitlocks End, Solihull, England

Coordinates: 52.392°N 1.852°W

Whitlocks End
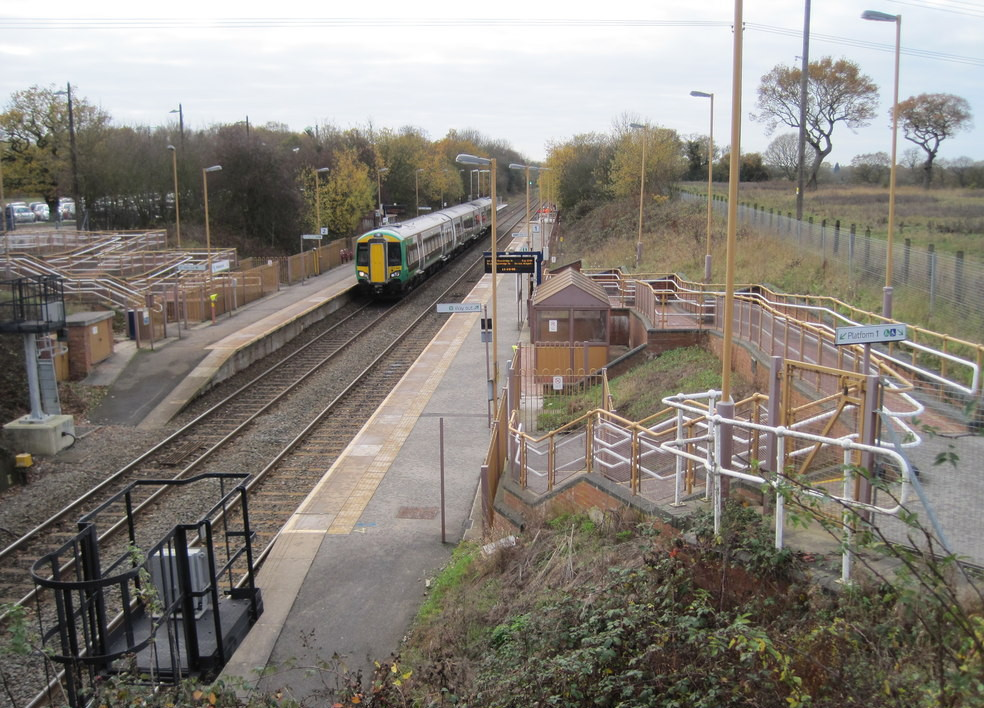
- Whitlocks End station in 2011

General information
- Location: Whitlock's End, Solihull; England
- Grid reference: SP102771
- Manager: West Midlands Railway
- Transit authority: Transport for West Midlands
- Platforms: 2

Other information
- Station code: WTE
- Fare zone: 4
- Classification: DfT category F2

History
- Opened: 6 June 1936

Passengers
- 2021/22: ▲117,820
- 2022/23: ▲146,724
- 2023/24: ▲180,682
- 2024/25: ▲223,908
- 2025/26: ▲244,078
Location
Notes
- Passenger statistics from the Office of Rail and Road

Whitlocks End railway station is a railway station on the North Warwickshire Line located next to, and named after the hamlet of Whitlock's End in the West Midlands of England. It lies a short distance from several villages: Tidbury Green and the new village of Dickens Heath in the West Midlands, and Major's Green and Hollywood in Worcestershire. The station, and all trains serving it, are operated by West Midlands Trains.

The station serves as the terminus for many local services on the Snow Hill Lines from either Kidderminster or Worcester Foregate Street. Of the two hourly services, one terminates/starts here, and one continues to Stratford-Upon-Avon.

== History ==
The station was opened by the Great Western Railway on 6 June 1936 to cater for the increased housing developments in the area, and was originally called Whitlocks End Halt, the suffix was dropped on 6 May 1968. The original 1936 station had short and low platforms, this led to it being completely rebuilt in 1999 at a cost of £800,000.

The station formerly had only one train per hour in either direction, this was changed from 1 October 2010, when services which had previously terminated at Shirley were extended to terminate at Whitlocks End, with the opening of a new turnback facility at the station. This was done in order to alleviate traffic congestion at Shirley station, by encouraging commuters to drive to Whitlocks End, which is the next station along the line. This in turn led to the station car park being extended in September 2011 to accommodate increased demand.

The 275-space free station car park is managed by Transport for West Midlands. Network Rail have recently completed a £60,000 improvement scheme that included the doubling of bicycle storage capacity from 12 to 24.

== Services ==
During Monday to Saturday daytimes:

- 2 trains per hour northbound to Birmingham Moor Street and Birmingham Snow Hill continuing to Kidderminster, with some late trains continuing onward to Worcester Shrub Hill.
- 1 train per hour southbound to Stratford-upon-Avon (one service also terminates here from the Birmingham direction).

On Sundays, there is an hourly service to Worcester Foregate Street via Snow Hill and to Stratford-upon-Avon.

Preceding station	National Rail	Following station
Shirley	West Midlands Railway; North Warwickshire Line	Wythall
