= Vintage Trains =

U.K. operator of heritage rail tours

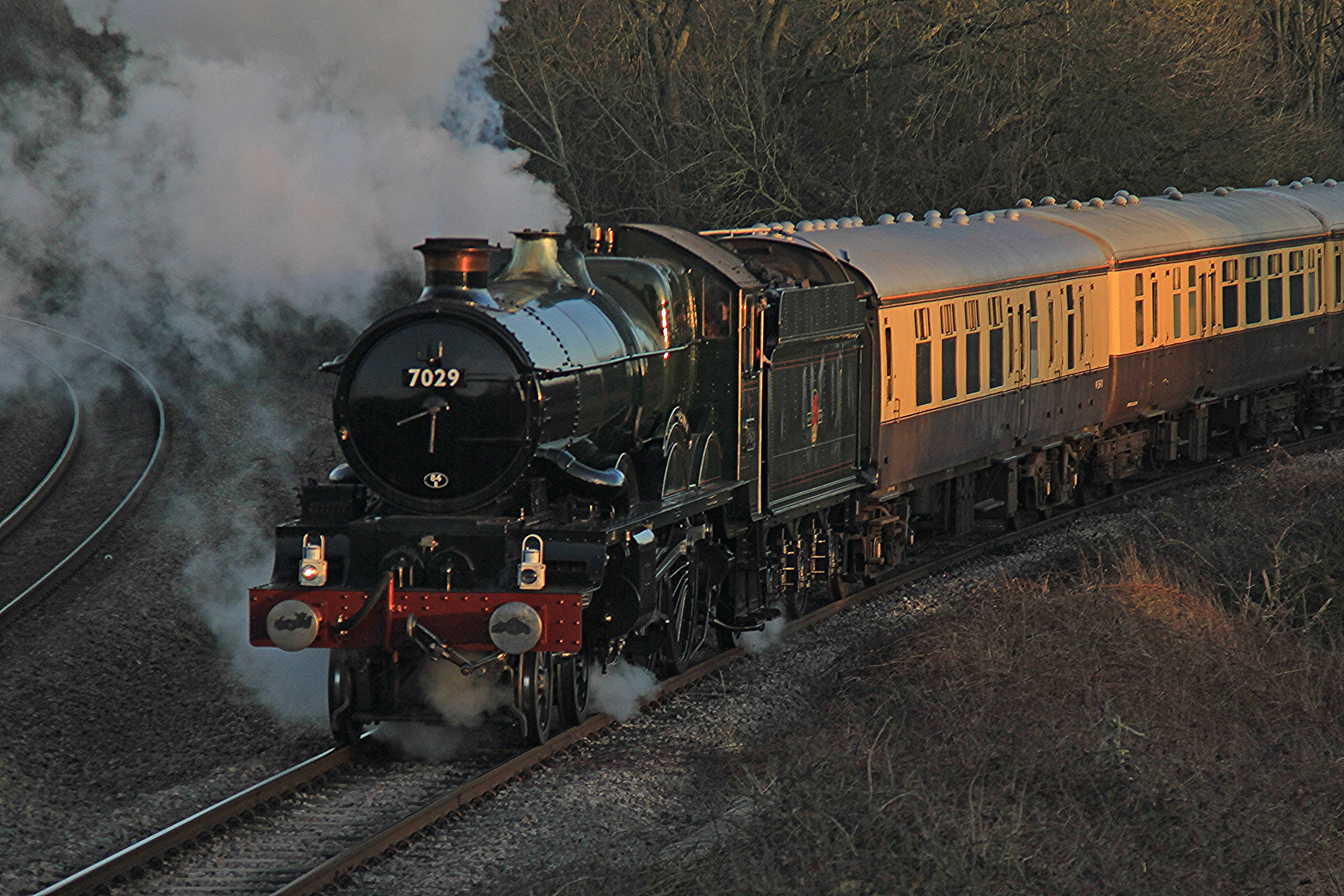
- GWR Castle Class 7029 'Clun Castle' hauling a service for Vintage Trains.

Overview
- Headquarters: Tyseley Locomotive Works
- Reporting mark: TY
- Dates of operation: 1964–Present

Other
- Website: www.vintagetrains.co.uk

Vintage Trains is a charitably-controlled train operating company established in 1964. Based at Tyseley Locomotive Works, Birmingham, they provide heritage railtours in the United Kingdom over the UK rail network. Their trains are usually formed of their fleet of heritage carriages, hauled by steam and/or diesel locomotives.

== Organisation ==
Vintage Trains is made up of four different companies:

- Vintage Trains Charitable Trust ("VTCT") (formerly Birmingham Railway Museum Trust), the parent charitable organisation which manages the subsidiaries below.
- Tyseley Locomotive Works Limited: a wholly owned subsidiary of Vintage Trains Charitable Trust, responsible for general and mechanical engineering and hire of locomotives and rolling stock.
- Vintage Trains Community Benefit Society: a publicly owned Community Benefit Society established to raise funds, controlled by Vintage Trains Charitable Trust through its ability to control the Board.
- Vintage Trains Ltd: a wholly owned subsidiary of the Community Benefit Society, Vintage Trains Ltd holds the licence to operate trains over UK rails. They are also responsible for the operation of express steam and heritage diesel railtours.

Vintage Trains is supported by a volunteer-run support organisation, the Friends of Vintage Trains.

== Railtours ==
=== Shakespeare Express ===
Vintage Trains runs the Shakespeare Express between either Birmingham, Derby, Worcester or Leicester to Stratford-upon-Avon, so named because of the destination city's connection to William Shakespeare. The service is usually steam-hauled and offers passengers first-class and dining experiences as part of a journey in their fleet of restored MK1 carriages. It has been operated by the company since 1999 and as of April 2025 is their only regularly operating service, making it an integral part of the services which Vintage Trains provides.

=== Steam Excursions ===
Vintage Trains operates a number of Steam Excursion trains across the United Kingdom. Services include 'The Shap Mountaineer' to Carlisle, 'The North Wales Coast Express' to Llandudno, and 'The Whistling Ghost to Minehead'. All services are hauled by either steam and/or heritage diesel locomotives. Trains consist of Vintage Trains' heritage carriages.

=== Polar Express ===
As a Christmas special event, four return trips between Birmingham Moor Street and a siding in Dorridge are run per day every Friday to Sunday in November and December. The journey is steam hauled and consists of actors re-enacting and guiding passengers through the story of The Polar Express.

== Mainline locomotives ==
Vintage Trains operates steam and heritage diesel locomotives on its mainline railtours, they are restored and maintained by the 'Tyseley Locomotive Works' subsidiary of Vintage Trains, which also undertakes contract restoration work and provides facilities for the restoration of these locomotives.
