= Alcester–Bearley branch line =

Railway line in Warwickshire, England

The Alcester–Bearley branch line was a 6 3/4-mile single-track branch railway line in Warwickshire, England. It was built by the Alcester Railway Company. It connected the manufacturing town of Alcester into the Great Western Railway network, opening in 1876.

Running through sparsely populated country, it was never commercially successful. During World War I it was closed and its track used in support of the war effort. During World War II it brought Coventry factory workers to a relocated manufacturing plant near the line when their own factory had been bombed.

The line closed in 1951.

== History ==
=== Origin ===
On 10 October 1860 the Stratford on Avon Railway Company opened a 9 1/4-mile-long single-track branch line; it ran from Hatton on the Great Western Railway Oxford and Birmingham line to Stratford-upon-Avon, and was mixed gauge. There were intermediate stations at Claverdon, Bearley and Wilmcote. Only narrow (standard) gauge trains ran after 31 December 1862 and the broad gauge rail was removed in 1869.

Alcester Railway Act 1872
- Act of Parliament
- Parliament of the United Kingdom
- Long title: An Act for making a Railway in the county of Warwick from the Bearley Station of the Stratford-upon-Avon Railway to the Alcester Station of the Evesham and Redditch Railway; and for other purposes.
- Citation: 35 & 36 Vict. c. clxx

Dates
- Royal assent: 6 August 1872

Text of statute as originally enacted

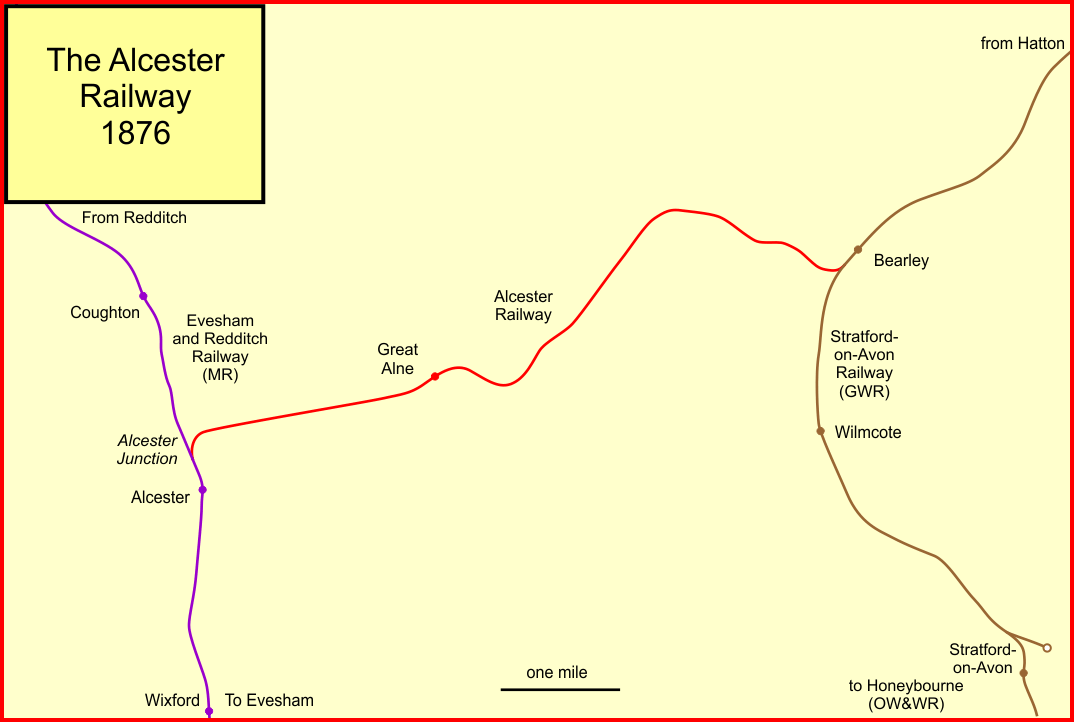
The Alcester Railway in 1876

Alcester was a minor, but significant manufacturing town, and encouraged by the Great Western Railway, the Alcester Railway Company was incorporated by the Alcester Railway Act 1872 (35 & 36 Vict. c. clxx) on 6 August 1872, to build a railway line from Bearley to Alcester, a distance of 6 3/4 miles. Alcester had a station on the Evesham and Redditch Railway, which was worked by the Midland Railway. It was to be a narrow (standard) gauge single line. The junction at Bearley was arranged to allow through running to and from Leamington.

The railway hereinbefore referred to and authorised by this Act is:

A railway six miles three furlongs and five and a half chains in length, commencing by a junction with the Stratford-upon-Avon Railway at or near a point thereon one hundred and forty yards or thereabouts to the southward of the south-west corner of the new signal box of the Bearley Station on that railway, and terminating by a junction with the Evesham and Redditch Railway at a point thereon four hundred and sixty-two yards or thereabouts northward of the northern end of the passenger platforms of the Alcester Station on that railway. — Section 5, Alcester Railway Act 1872 (35 & 36 Vict. c. clxx)

== Opening and early years ==
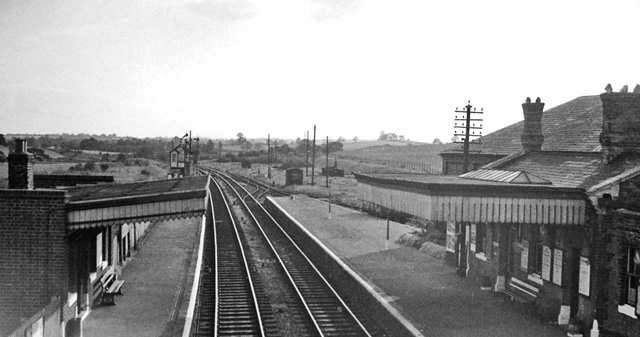
Bearley station; the Alcester line curves to the right beyond the signal gantry

The line was opened on 4 September 1876. At Alcester it made a junction with the Midland Railway, and used that company's station. There was initially one intermediate station, at Great Alne (2 1/2 miles). Services on the line were operated from the outset by the Great Western Railway, and maintenance of the line was handed over to the GWR on 4 September 1877. (Note: In other words, there was a one-year maintenance clause in the construction contract.) On 22 July 1878 the Great Western Railway Act 1878 (41 & 42 Vict. c. ccviii) authorised the acquisition of the Alcester Railway Company by the GWR, but it was not until 1883 that the vesting took place. (Note: The transfer was to the Great Western Railway and the Stratford-on-Avon Railway jointly; the Stratford company was still in existence; it was itself absorbed by the GWR in 1883.)

== North Warwickshire Railway ==
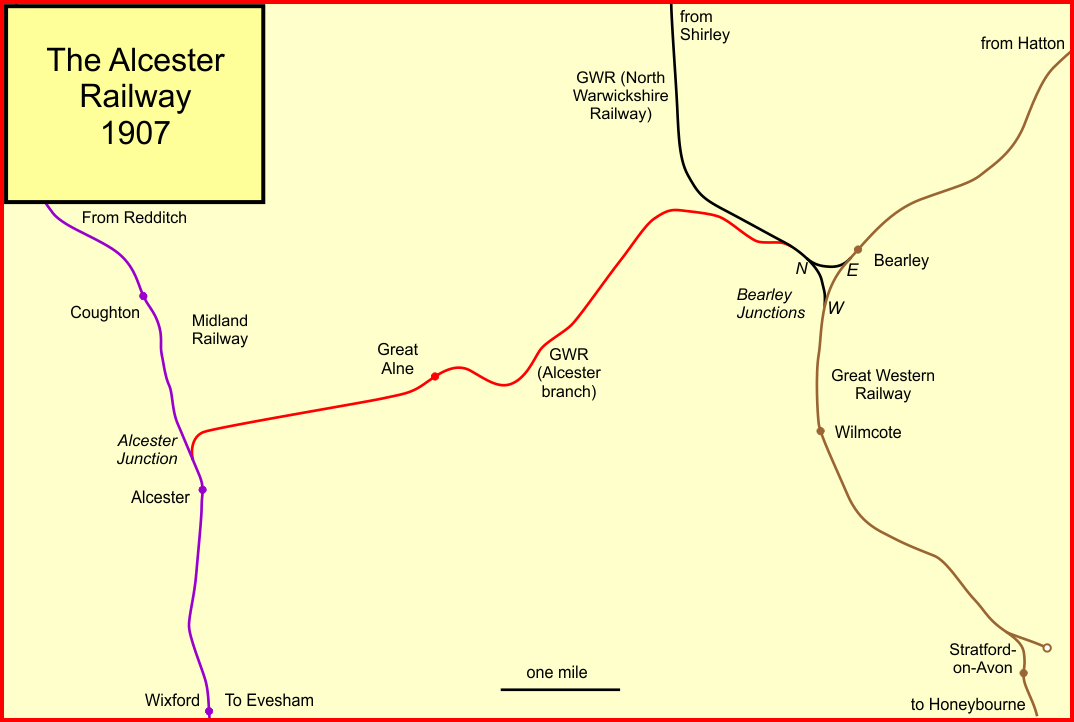
The Alcester line in 1907

The construction of the North Warwickshire line by the Great Western Railway in 1907 affected the branch. West of Bearley it created a triangular junction by adding a southern chord; and it used the formation of the Alcester branch for 250 yards. Bearley to Bearley North Junction (on the original Alcester Railway route) was temporarily taken out of use from 5 June 1907 until 9 December 1907, during which period trains from Bearley to Alcester reversed at Bearley West Junction using the chord line which had just opened. (Note: The junction names are counter-intuitive; East Junction is close to Bearley station; North Junction is closest to Great Alne, and is the junction for the North Warwickshire line; West Junction is at the Stratford-on-Avon apex.)

== First World War measures ==
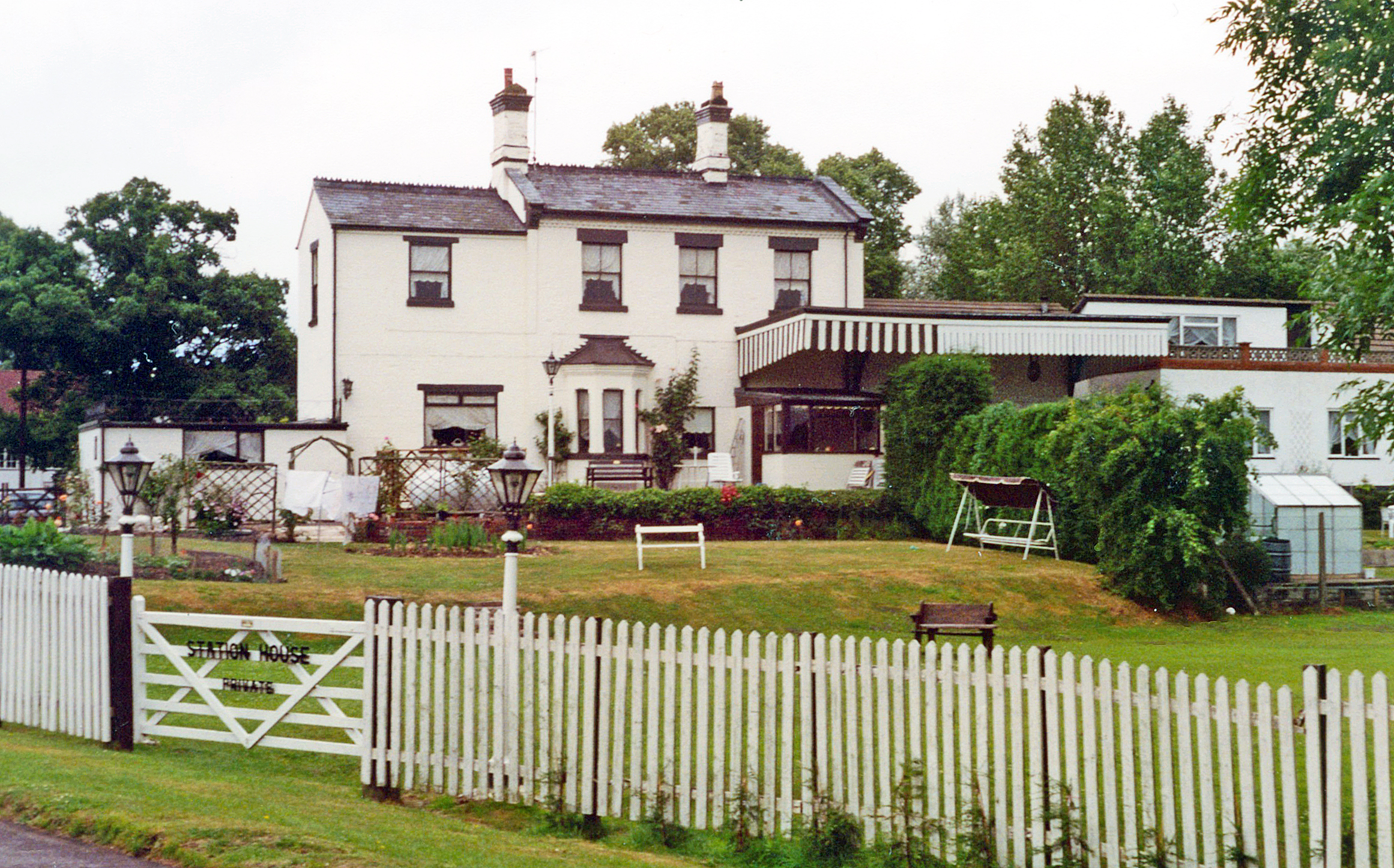
Great Alne former station building in 1994

As an emergency measure during World War I, the branch was closed on 1 January 1917: the track was lifted in March, for use in support of military action. After the cessation of hostilities, it was decided to reinstate the line and re-install track. On 18 December 1922 the line was reopened from Bearley to Great Alne, and a new halt at Aston Cantlow was brought into use. On 1 August 1923 the branch was reopened throughout.

== Aston Cantlow halt ==
A halt was opened at Aston Cantlow on 18 December 1922, in response to local requests. The halt was some distance from the village.

== Second World War ==
The passenger service on the line was again withdrawn on 25 September 1939.

The Maudslay Motor Company was an important vehicle manufacturing works in Coventry; at the outbreak of World War II it was considered important to be able to sustain production in the event of heavy bombing by enemy aircraft, and a "shadow" factory was constructed near Great Alne; it came to be known as Castle Maudslay. As had been foreseen, the central works was badly damaged in bombing in 1940, as part of the so-called Baedeker Blitz. The branch line was valuable in bringing workers from Coventry to the shadow factory.

Great Alne was opened as an unadvertised halt in July 1941 for the Maudslay workers. Trains ran from Leamington in connection with services from Coventry; these specials continued until 3 July 1944 when buses were substituted.

=== Final closure ===
After its wartime use, the branch was then used for storing crippled wagons, until closure on 1 March 1951; a short length was retained at each end until August 1960 as sidings. The Bearley North curve was kept for use when a diversion was needed from the main line. It was also used occasionally for stabling Royal Train specials overnight. It was closed on 20 November 1960.

== Description of route ==
The branch was generally worked to and from Bearley, although the station did not have a bay platform for the branch. When the Alcester train departed from Bearley, it curved round a single line to Bearley North Junction, from 1907 the junction for the North Warwickshire line. It passed under the thirteen-span Edstone Aqueduct, erected in 1813 and carrying the Stratford-upon-Avon Canal. The branch engine took water from the canal at this point, a wheel-operated valve controlling supplies. Originally a filter prevented fish entering the locomotive's tanks. The height of the aqueduct caused Bearley North Junction to have a signal 50 feet tall—unusually lofty for the GWR, with a co-acting arm fixed at a height of 20 feet. ("Probably the tallest signal on the GWR" according to Goode.) Aston Cantlow halt consisted of a sleeper-built platform and a corrugated iron hut.

About a mile beyond the line crossed the River Alne; the river flooded on 31 December 1900 and the branch was closed for a week. Great Alne station had a very domestic-looking two-storey building with the stationmaster's house on the single platform. The station awning was curiously off-centre leaving the main entrance uncovered. A goods loop adjoined and dispatched flour from the local water-powered mill. The line crossed the River Arrow by a girder bridge curving southwards before becoming double and joining the Midland Railway at Alcester Junction. From there to Alcester station, the GWR had running powers. Alongside the junction was a one-road engine shed with brick walls and a slate roof. The pump house was alongside, steam being supplied by the branch engine, which was usually an 0-4-2T. Following the shed's closure on 1 November 1915, the branch was worked by an engine from Stratford. When the line was reinstated after World War I, the Alcester shed was reopened, on 1 August 1923 but finally closed on 27 October 1939. Alcester station had separate booking offices for Midland Railway and Great Western Railway passengers.

== Train service and engine power ==
The train service showed little change over the years: there were five trains each way in 1887 and 1910 and six in 1938, the only variety being the times taken for the journey being twenty minutes, seventeen minutes and twenty-five minutes respectively.

The branch was originally worked by outside frame 0-6-0STs, then various 0-4-2Ts including No. 203 early in the twentieth century, followed by No. 537 and finally No. 4848. Usually the engine hauled an auto coach, the locomotive being at the Bearley end. In 1938, of the six trains each way, two were mixed, the latter having a brake van branded 'Bearley RU'. The auto car made one through trip to Stratford Mondays to Fridays and three on Saturdays.

== Location list ==
- Bearley, Alcester Branch Junction; renamed Bearley [East] Junction from 1907;
- Bearley North Junction; apex of Bearley triangle, and divergence of North Warwickshire Line;
- Aston Cantlow Halt; opened 18 December 1922; closed 25 September 1939;
- Great Alne; opened 4 September 1876; closed 1 January 1917; reopened 18 December 1922; closed 25 September 1939; used for workmen's trains July 1941 to 3 July 1944;
- Alcester Junction; convergence with Midland Railway;
- Alcester; Midland Railway station.
