= Great Alne =

Village in Warwickshire, England

Coordinates: 52.23447°N 1.82571°W

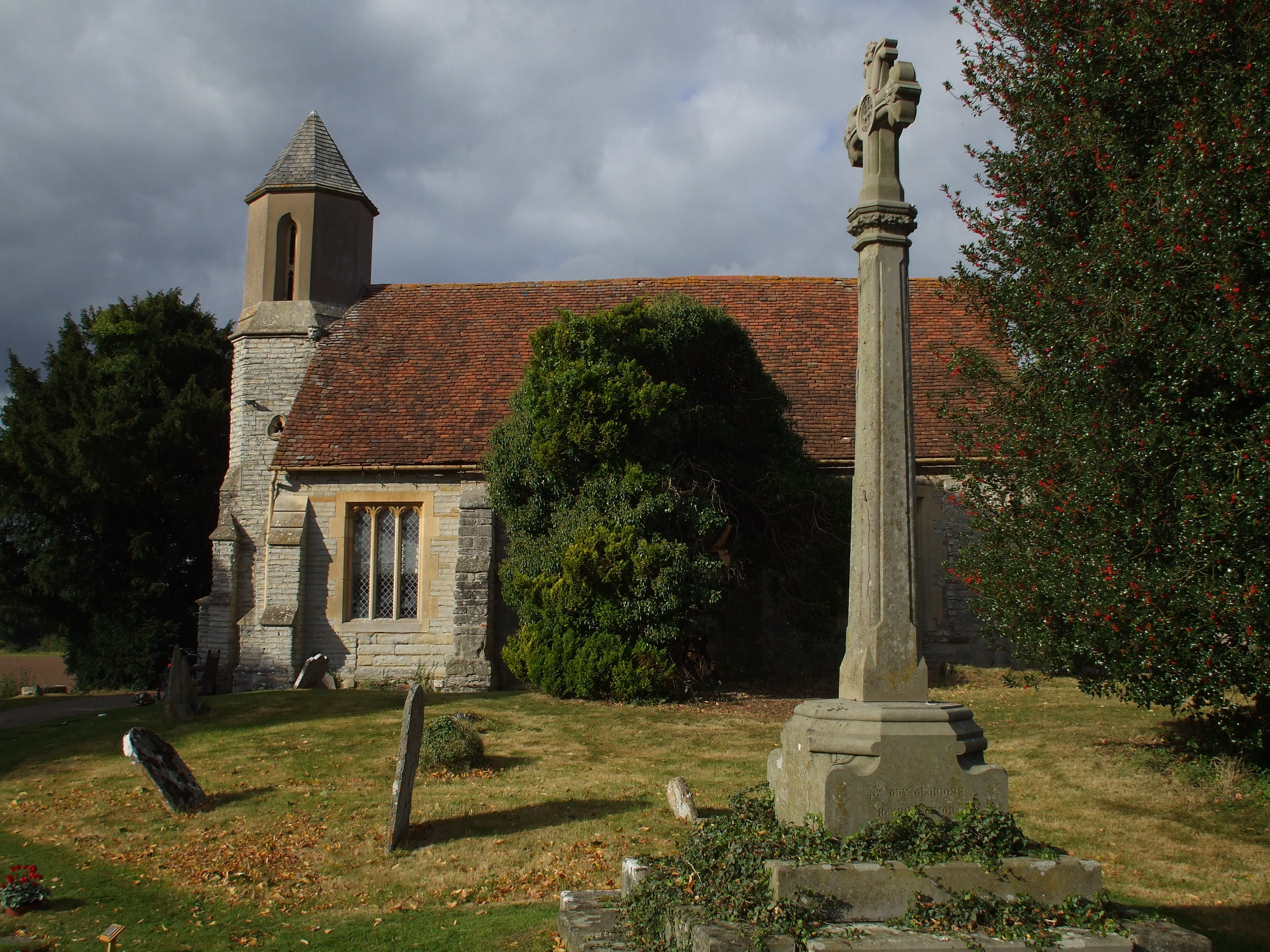
- St Mary Magdalene

- Location within Warwickshire
- Population: 570 (2011)
- OS grid reference: SP120596
  - London: 110 miles(177km) SE
- District: Stratford-on-Avon
- Shire county: Warwickshire
- Region: West Midlands
- Country: England
- Sovereign state: United Kingdom
- Post town: Alcester
- Postcode district: B49
- Dialling code: 01789
- Police: Warwickshire
- Fire: Warwickshire
- Ambulance: West Midlands
- UK Parliament: Stratford-on-Avon
- Website: www.greatalne-pc.gov.uk/village.cfm

Great Alne is a small village in Warwickshire, England, 7 miles (11 km) north-west of Stratford-upon-Avon, 3 miles (4.8 km) north-east of Alcester and 15 miles (24 km) from Warwick, on the road to Wootton Wawen. It takes its name from the River Alne and was first chronicled in the charter of King Ethelbald (723–737). In 1969 Warwickshire County Council designated part of Great Alne as a Conservation Area, including most of the village east of the Memorial Hall and twelve listed buildings of local architectural and historical value. At the 2001 Census the population was 587.

== History ==
Land at Alne was given by Coenwulf of Mercia, about 809 to his newly founded abbey of Winchcombe, in Gloucestershire. The Domesday Book records "in Ferncombe Hundred, Winchcombe Abbey holds 6 hides in (Great) Alne. Land for 6 ploughs. In lordship 1 plough; 3 slaves. 11 villagers with 4 smallholders have 5 ploughs. A mill at 5s; woodland 1/2 league long with 4 furlongs wide. The value was £3; now £4." It remained in the hands of the monastery until the dissolution, when it passed to the Crown, who leased it to the Throckmortons of Coughton until 1 December 1599. This is when Queen Elizabeth I sold it to Edward Stone of the city of Westminster and Thomas Gainsford of the City of London, Gainsford later making over his part to Stone.

It has since passed through a number of private hands, being owned by different local families including the Throckmortons and Holyoakes. Alne Mill, converted into luxury flats in 1989, lies about 0.25 miles (0.40 km) to the south of the village and the road leading down to it is probably the Milnewey or Millway mentioned in 1541 and 1728. The mill at Alne, which was worth 5s. in the Domesday Book, and had increased in value to 6s. 8d. in the Taxation of 1291. In 1516 it was let by the abbot to John and Elizabeth Palmer at an annual rent of £1 10s.

== Governance ==
Great Alne is in the Kinwarton ward of Stratford-on-Avon District Council and the Studley division of Warwickshire County Council. Great Alne is represented by District Councillor Janine Lee of the Conservative Party and County Councillor Luke Cooper of Restore Britain. Nationally it is part of Stratford on Avon parliamentary constituency, whose MP since the 2024 United Kingdom general election has been Manuela Perteghella of the Liberal Democrats, defeating the Conservative candidate. It was included in the West Midlands electoral region of the European Parliament.

== Notable buildings ==
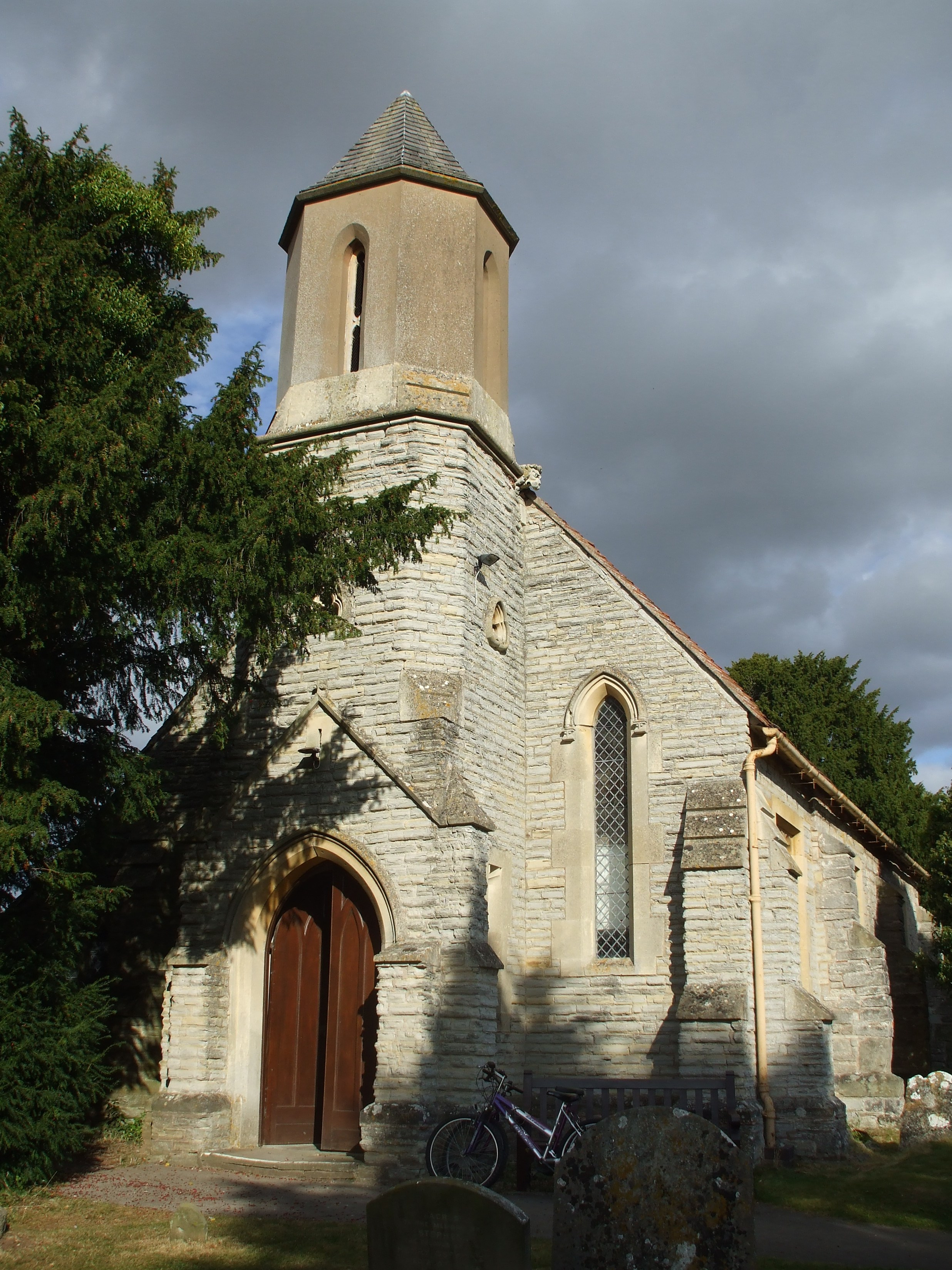
St Mary Magdalene view of the west porch and tower

The parish church of St Mary Magdalene consists of a chancel with a modern north vestry, nave, north aisle and west porch-turret. Whilst the church is 13th century in origin with some later additions, much restoration was completed in 1837 when the nave was enlarged and a west gallery added, providing 86 additional seats, according to a record in the church. The west wall, with an entrance and two windows, is modern, as is also the west porch, which is carried up as a square bell-turret changing to an octagon at the top and having an octagonal pyramidal roof. There is one bell of 1670 by John Martin of Worcester. The modern north aisle has two north windows and one at the east and at the west. The font, of flower-pot shape, may be an old one retooled: it has a shallow bowl. The top has been repaired on opposite sides, probably where there had been staples.

The stained glass in the east window dates from 1860 and is by Hardman & Co., who were also responsible for the stained glass in the Houses of Parliament. Thomas Clarke, the rector at the time of the puritan ‘Survei of the Ministrie in Warwickshier’ of 1586, was described; "parson no precher nor learned, yet honest of life & zealous in religion he hath 3 or 4 charges & cures beside that of Kynerton, Witeley? (Weethley) he supplieth by his deputies: his hirelinges that serue by his non-residentship are all dumbe & idle & some of them gamsters : vah of all Ixxx" a yeare." A wooden war memorial to the memory of the men of the parish who gave their lives in the First World War and Second World Wars includes the name of a woman, Sister E.M. Elvins.

There is one pub-restaurant, The Huff Cap, formerly the Mother Huff Cap Inn, the name deriving from the days when most pubs brewed their own beer, Huff Cap being a 16th-century term for a strong ale that would ‘huf one’s cap’ or make the head swell, not for the froth on the top of the beer as is sometimes stated. The 'mother' is likely to be the dame who brewed the beer and managed the public house. In 1746 the pub is thought to have been 'The Huff Cap' and to have acquired 'mother' later. This hostelry was once on the main coach road from Stratford to Bridgnorth.

== Transport ==
The old railway station, built on the Great Western Railway branch-line from Bearley to Alcester opened in 1876 but is now converted to a residential dwelling. The station sat on the GWR's Alcester Branch linking their Hatton – Stratford-upon-Avon Branch with the now defunct Midland Railway's Gloucester Loop line South of Redditch. The line closed to passengers in 1917 only to reopen between 1922/3 but stopping again in 1939 for passenger use, apart from workers' trains to the nearby Maudslay Motor Company's works from Birmingham. The line closed completely in 1951 with lifting of the track taking place shortly afterwards.

== Education ==
Great Alne Primary School is located in the village.

== Gallery ==
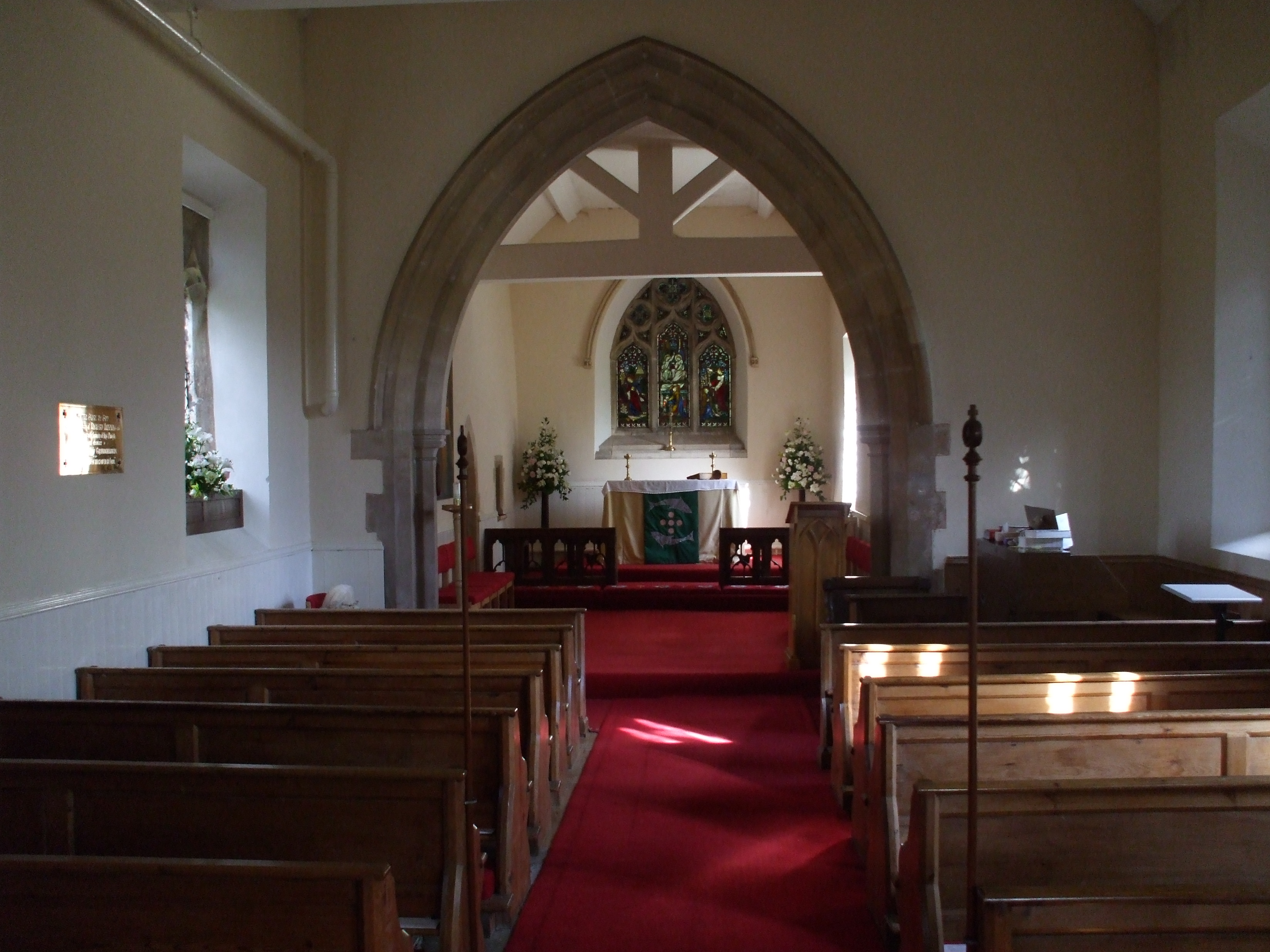
Interior of the church

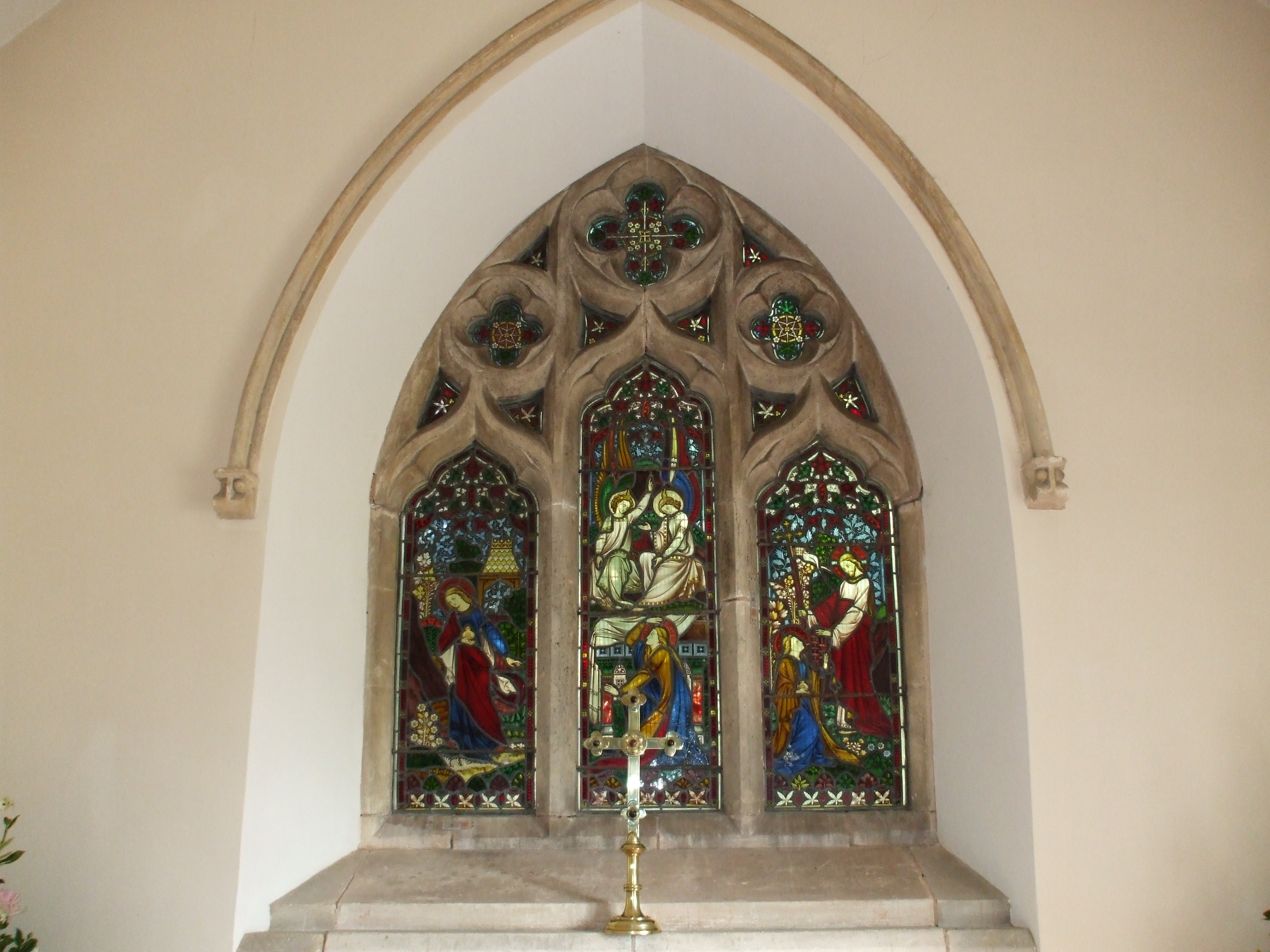
East Window depicting biblical scenes from the life of Mary Magdalene

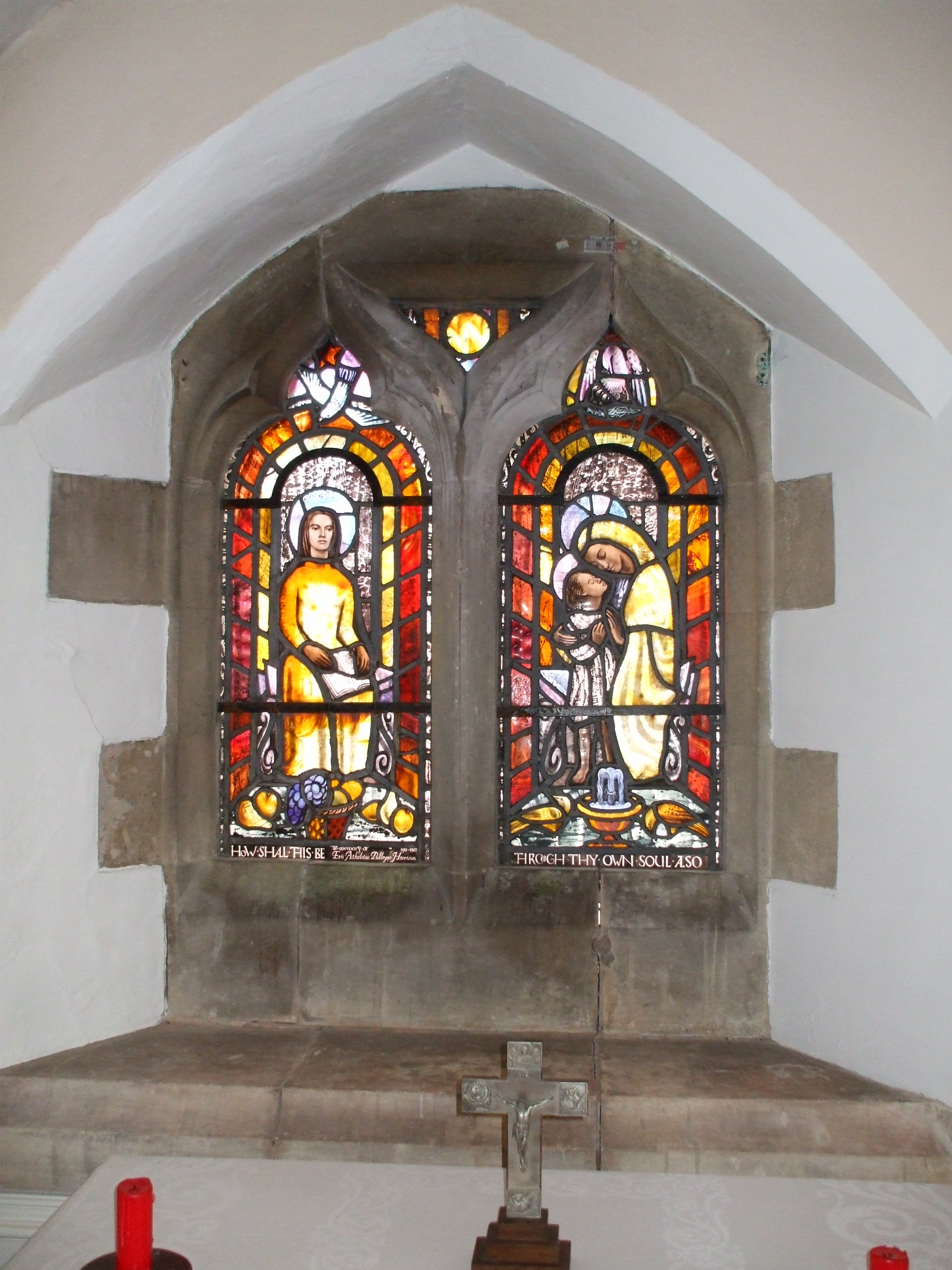
Stained Glass North Aisle

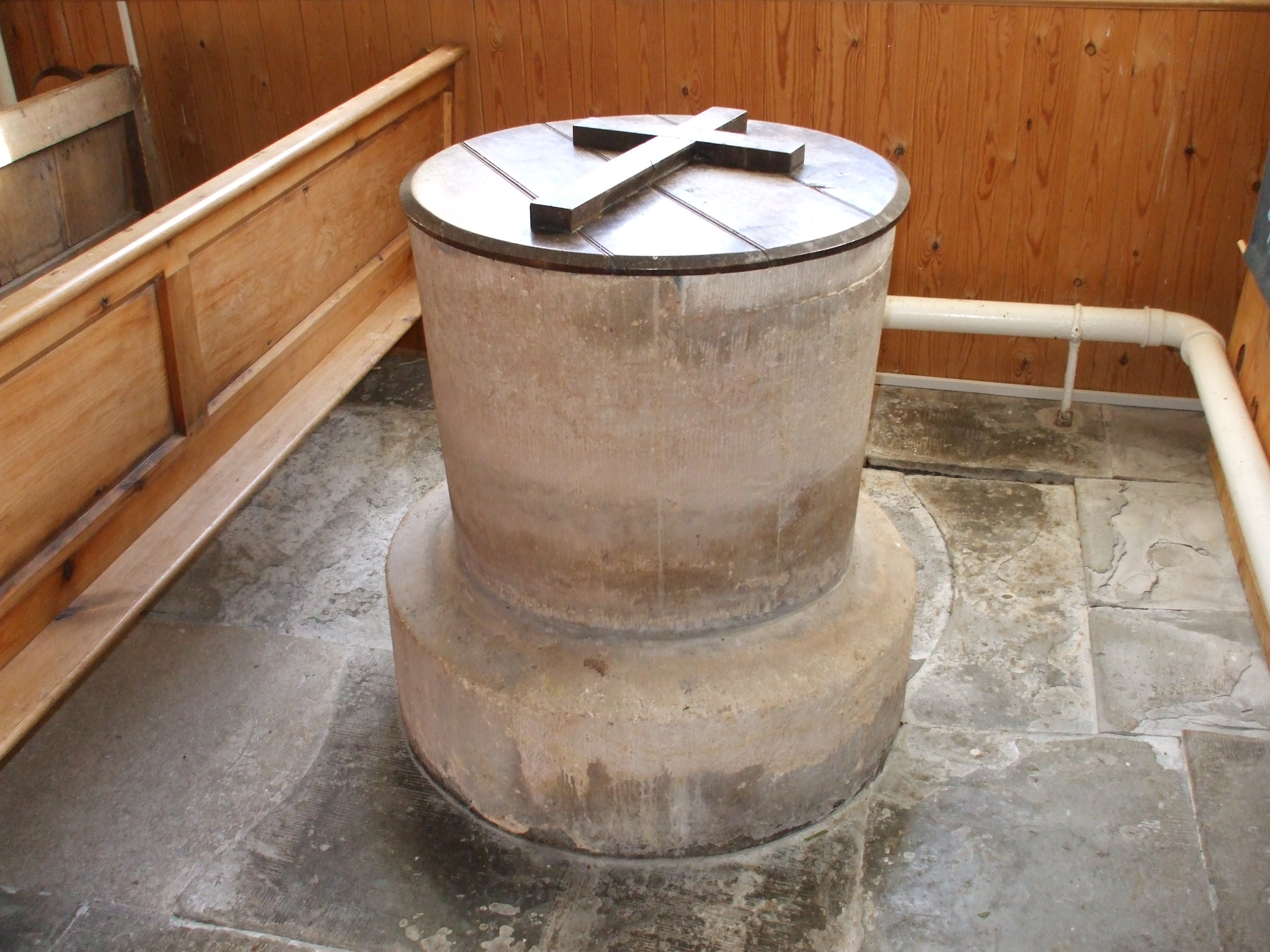
The Font

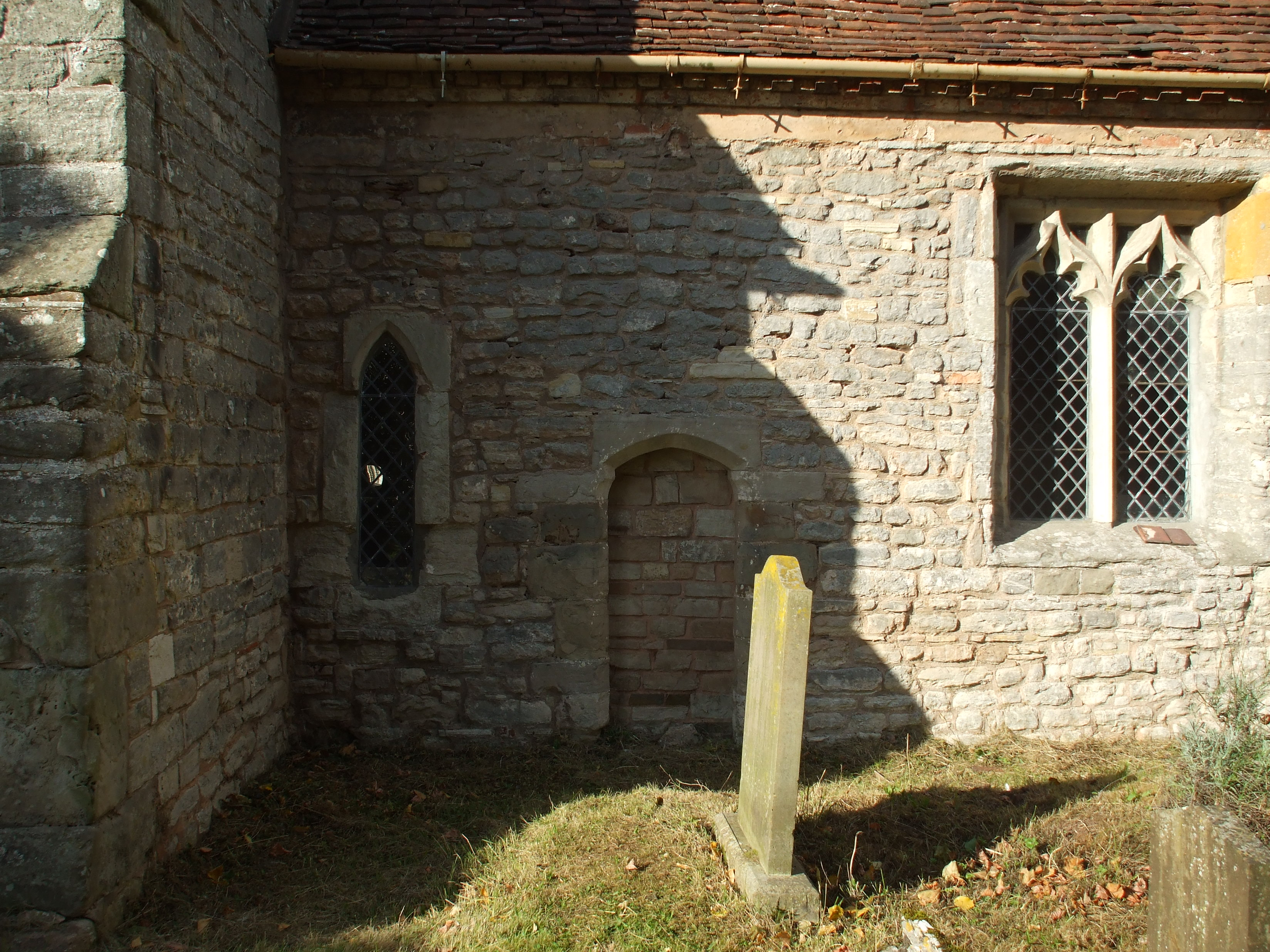
Exterior stone work

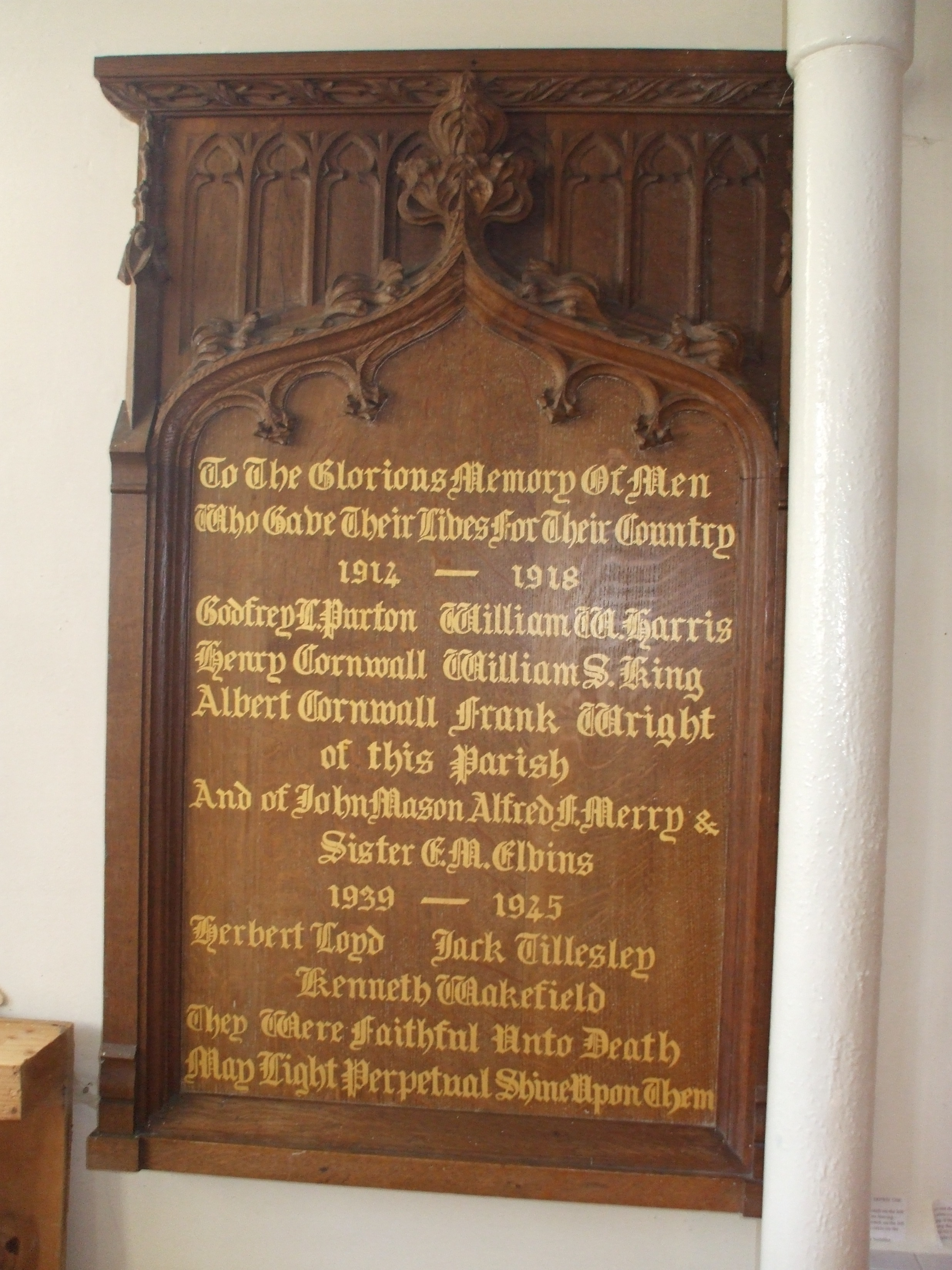
War Memorial
