= Aston Cantlow Halt railway station =

Former railway station in Warwickshire, England

Aston Cantlow

General information
- Location: Aston Cantlow, Stratford-on-Avon; England
- Coordinates: 52.2466°N 1.7909°W
- Grid reference: SP143609
- Platforms: 1

Other information
- Status: Disused

History
- Original company: Great Western Railway
- Pre-grouping: Great Western Railway
- Post-grouping: Great Western Railway

Key dates
- 18 December 1922: Station opened
- 25 September 1939: Station closed
- 1941: Station re-opened for workmen's trains
- 1944: Station finally closed
Location

Aston Cantlow Halt railway station is a disused railway station half a mile north of the village of Aston Cantlow, Warwickshire, England. The platform was 200 feet (61 m) long by 8 feet (2.4 m) wide and composed of wooden railway sleepers. There was a corrugated iron waiting hut with a wooden bench inside. Although there was no goods yard or sidings the station was lit by lights tended by the station master from Great Alne.

== History ==
The station, opened in 1922, was located on Great Western Railway's Bearley to Alcester line. Although the line itself was opened many years earlier in 1876 it wasn't until after the First World War that residents demands were met at Aston Cantlow. It stayed part of the GWR following the Grouping of 1923.

The station then closed under this management just before the Second World War due to wartime economy. It was reopened in 1941 but was rarely used and finally closed for good in 1944. After the track was taken up the station site became overgrown and, as of 2010, little or no evidence can be found of the station.

Preceding station	Disused railways	Following station
Bearley; Line closed, station open	Great Western Railway; Alcester to Hatton Branch	Great Alne; Line and station closed
Wilmcote; Line and station open	Great Western Railway; Wilmcote to Alcester Line	Great Alne; Line and station closed
