= LPW =

LPW could refer to:

- Lapworth railway station, England; National Rail station code LPW.
- Lumen per watt (better expressed in standard unit symbols as lm/W)
