= Great Alne railway station =

Former railway station in Warwickshire, England

Coordinates: 52.23032°N 1.83149°W

Great Alne
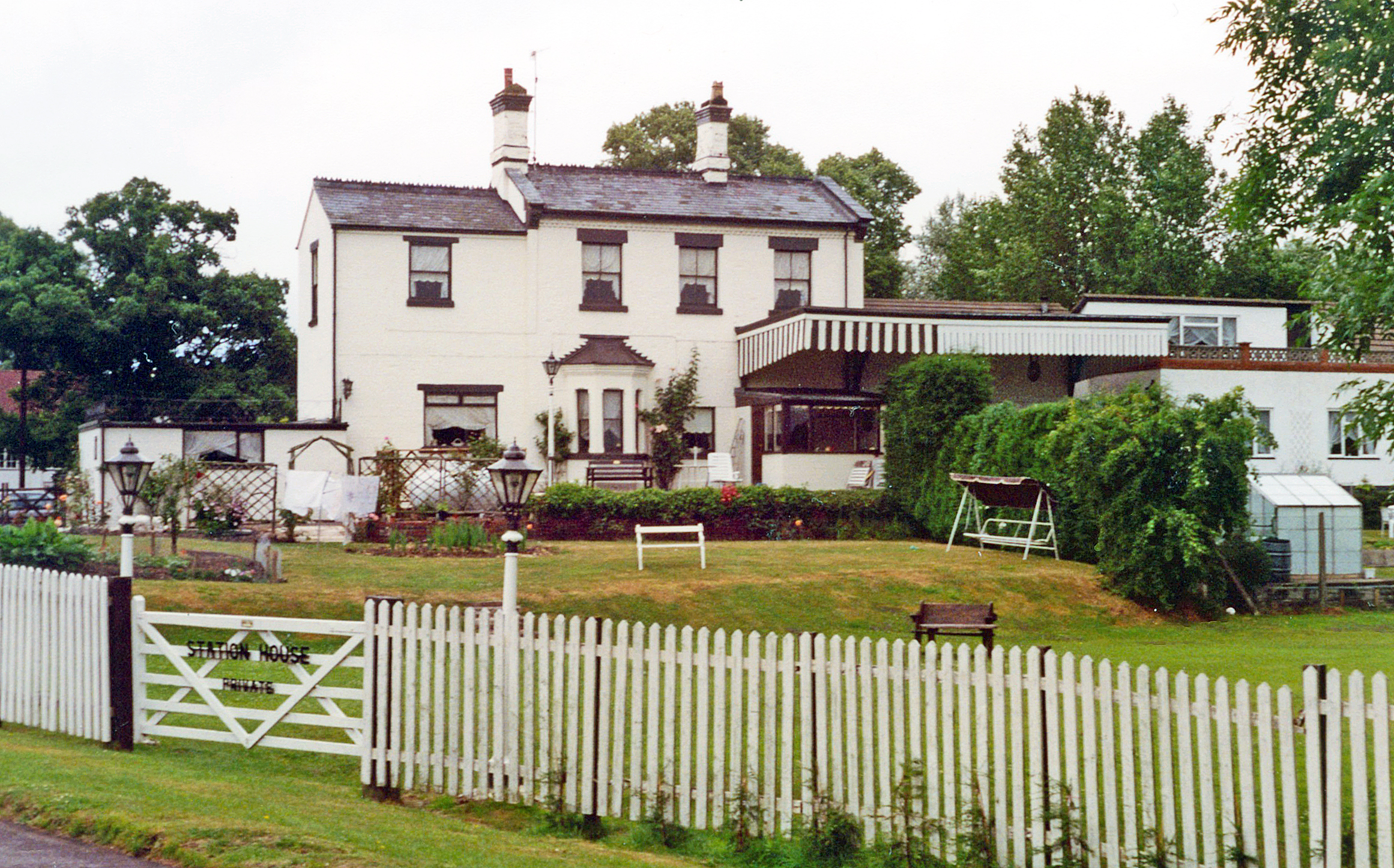
- The site of the station in 1994

General information
- Location: Great Alne, Stratford-on-Avon; England
- Platforms: 1

Other information
- Status: Disused

History
- Original company: Great Western Railway
- Pre-grouping: Great Western Railway
- Post-grouping: Great Western Railway

Key dates
- 1876: Opened
- 1 January 1917: closed
- 18 December 1922: reopened
- 25 September 1939: Closed
Location

Great Alne Railway Station was a station in the village of Great Alne in Warwickshire on the Great Western Railway line from Alcester, Warwickshire to Bearley, Warwickshire.

The old railway station building, built on the Great Western Railway branch-line from Bearley to Alcester, opened in 1876 The line closed to passengers in 1917 only to reopen in 1922 but stopping again in 1939 for passenger use, apart from workers' trains to the nearby Castle Maudslay Motor Company's works from Coventry which ran from 1941 until 1944. The line closed completely in 1951 with lifting of the track taking place shortly afterwards,. Sections of the route still remain, however, as roads and footpaths, notably to Alcester. After closure it was converted to a residential building.

Preceding station	Disused railways	Following station
Alcester	Great Western Railway; Alcester to Hatton Branch	Aston Cantlow Halt
