= Sty (disambiguation) =

A sty is an enclosure for raising livestock pigs.

Sty or STY may also refer to:

- Shin Tae-yong (born 1970), South Korean football manager and former player
- Siberian Tatar language (ISO code)
- Stony Point railway station (station code), Melbourne, Victoria, Australia
- Stratford-upon-Avon Parkway railway station (station code), Warwickshire, England

== See also ==
- Stye, an eyelid infection
