= Lapworth railway station =

Railway station in Warwickshire, England

Lapworth
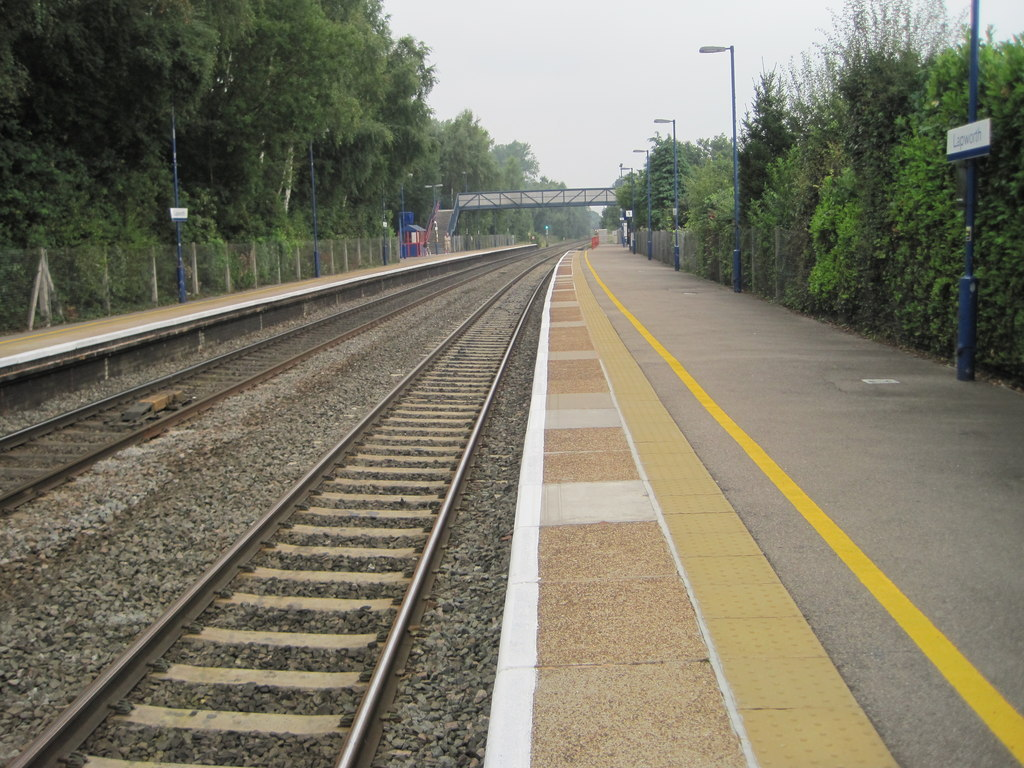
- Lapworth station platforms.

General information
- Location: Lapworth, Warwick District; England
- Coordinates: 52.3420°N 1.7257°W
- Grid reference: SP187716
- Manager: Chiltern Railways
- Platforms: 2

Other information
- Station code: LPW
- Classification: DfT category F1

History
- Original company: Great Western Railway
- Pre-grouping: Great Western Railway
- Post-grouping: Great Western Railway

Key dates
- 1854: Opened as Kingswood
- 1 May 1902: Renamed Lapworth

Passengers
- 2021/22: ▲51,444
- 2022/23: ▲77,008
- 2023/24: ▲92,736
- 2024/25: ▼38,396
- 2025/26: ▲39,622
Location
Notes
- Passenger statistics from the Office of Rail and Road

Lapworth railway station serves the village of Kingswood, Warwickshire, near the village of Lapworth from which it takes its name.

The station has two platforms connected by a footbridge. Chiltern Railways, who manage the station, provide services on its London/Leamington/Birmingham/Stourbridge route. West Midlands Trains also serve the station, with trains to Worcester, via Kidderminster and Birmingham, and to Stratford using the Snow Hill lines.

== History ==
The station was opened by the Great Western Railway in 1854. It was known as Kingswood until 1 May 1902 when the name was changed to Lapworth to avoid confusion with the station of the same name in Surrey. From 1894, Lapworth was the starting point of a short lived branch line to Henley-in-Arden. The branch was closed as an economy measure during the First World War in 1915 to passengers and to freight in 1917, it never reopened after WW 1.

A footbridge spans the remaining two tracks, and continues to the west of the northbound platform spanning where quadruple tracks once existed. For a brief period prior to the lifting of the quadruple tracks there was a DMU service along what had been the GWR's Paddington - Birkenhead main line. It plied between Wellington (Shropshire) and Lapworth stopping at all the intermediate stations and linking them with Wolverhampton Low Level and Birmingham Snow Hill.

The goods sidings and 2 of the 4 platforms were removed in the 1960s and 1970s respectively due to falling usage.

The station is unstaffed; ticketing is restricted to a 'Permit-to-Travel' machine located at the main entrance to the station (off Station Lane) at the north end of the London-bound (southbound) platform. The station can also be accessed via a footpath from Mill Lane.

== Accidents and incidents ==
- On 30 November 1948, locomotive 4150 was running round its train when it was in collision with a passenger train hauled by 5022 Wigmore Castle, which had overrun signals. Eight passengers were injured.

== Services ==
On weekdays, the station is served by both Chiltern Railways and West Midlands Trains.

The typical service pattern is as follows:

West Midlands Railway:

- 1 train per hour to Worcester Foregate Street via Birmingham Snow Hill.

Some West Midlands Railway services run instead to Leamington Spa or towards Worcester Shrub Hill.

- 1 train per hour to Stratford-upon-Avon.

Most services on this route run non-stop to Stratford Parkway, although some peak time services call additionally at Claverdon and Bearley.

Chiltern Railways:

- 1 train per 2 hours to Leamington Spa
- 1 train per 2 hours to Birmingham Moor Street.

Some Chiltern Railways services to/from London Marylebone call at Lapworth, as of December 2023 there are two northbound and one southbound such services, all in the evening.

On Saturdays, the station is served by both Chiltern Railways and West Midlands Trains.

The typical service pattern is as follows:

West Midlands Railway:

- 1 train per hour to Worcester Foregate Street via Birmingham Snow Hill.
- 1 train per hour to Stratford-upon-Avon.

Chiltern Railways:

- 7 trains per day to Birmingham Moor Street
- 1 train per 3 hours to London Marylebone

On Sundays, only Chiltern Railways serves the station.

The typical service pattern is as follows:

- 1 train per 2 hours to Birmingham Moor Street.
- 1 train per 2 hours to London Marylebone.

There is no West Midlands Railway service on Sundays.

Preceding station	National Rail	Following station
Dorridge	West Midlands Railway; Worcester-Kidderminster-Birmingham-Solihull-Stratford	Claverdon or Stratford-upon-Avon Parkway
Dorridge	West Midlands Railway; Worcester-Kidderminster-Birmingham-Leamington Spa; Limited Service	Hatton
Dorridge	Chiltern Railways; London-Leamington-Birmingham	Hatton
	Disused railways	
Terminus	Great Western Railway; Birmingham and Henley in Arden Railway	Henley-in-Arden; Line closed, station open
