= Wilmcote railway station =

Railway station in Warwickshire, England

Coordinates: 52°13′21″N 1°45′21″W

Wilmcote
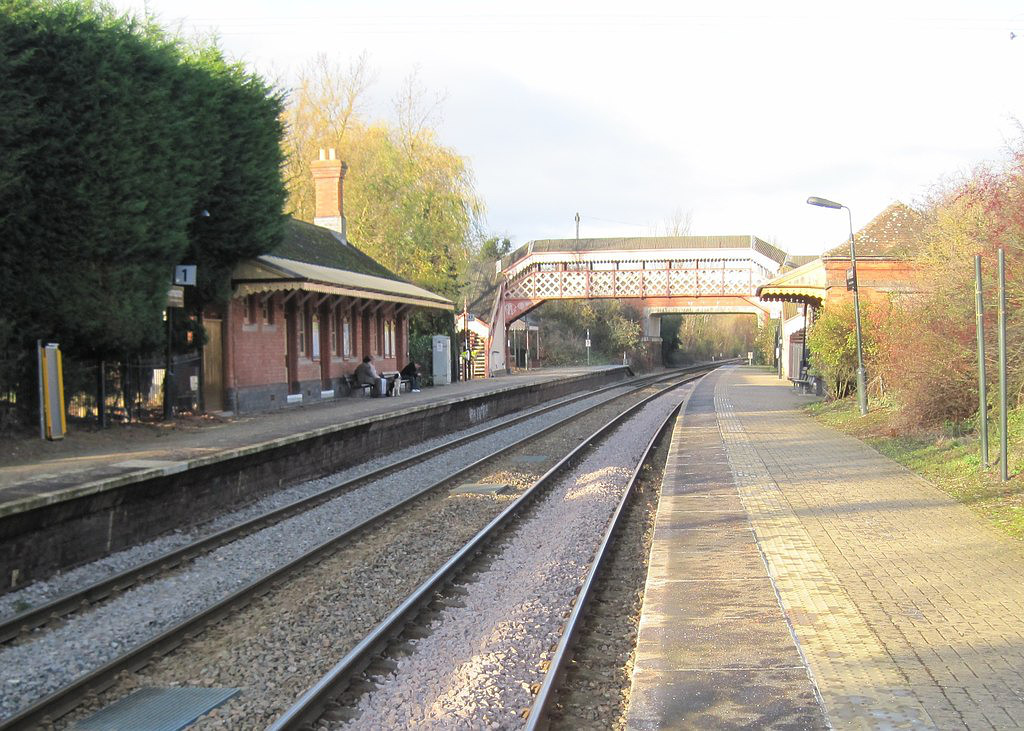
- Wilmcote station.

General information
- Location: Wilmcote, Stratford-on-Avon; England
- Grid reference: SP167582
- Manager: West Midlands Trains
- Platforms: 2

Other information
- Station code: WMC
- Classification: DfT category F2

History
- Opened: 1860 (rebuilt 1907)

Passengers
- 2021/22: ▲14,696
- 2022/23: ▲16,576
- 2023/24: ▲16,626
- 2024/25: ▲19,570
- 2025/26: ▲22,602
Location
Notes
- Passenger statistics from the Office of Rail and Road

Wilmcote railway station serves the village of Wilmcote, about 4 miles (6.4 km) north of Stratford-upon-Avon in Warwickshire, England. The station is run by West Midlands Trains. It is served by both West Midlands Railway and Chiltern Railways trains.

== History ==
The original single platform Wilmcote station opened in October 1860, on the Stratford-upon-Avon Railway's branch line from Hatton to Stratford.

The station was rebuilt slightly south of the original with two platforms in 1907, when the Great Western Railway doubled and upgraded this part of the branch line to main line standards, in order to incorporate it into the North Warwickshire Line, which created a new main line route between Birmingham and Cheltenham Spa.

== Facilities ==
Wilmcote station is unstaffed. Tickets must be purchased from the senior conductor or train manager on the train.

Step free access is only available on the Birmingham Snow Hill bound platform. The nearest stations with step free access are Bearley and Wootton Wawen.

== Services ==
=== West Midlands Railway ===
Wilmcote is served by an hourly service, to Kidderminster via Birmingham Snow Hill northbound and to Stratford-upon-Avon along the North Warwickshire Line. Most northbound trains run via Earlswood and Shirley. A limited service runs via Dorridge and Solihull. Some trains, mainly early morning and evening services continue to Worcester Foregate Street. Some early morning and late night services start/terminate at Stourbridge Junction, Birmingham Snow Hill or Birmingham Moor Street.

On Sundays there is an hourly service to Worcester Foregate Street via Birmingham Snow Hill and Kidderminster northbound and to Stratford-upon-Avon southbound. All services run via Earlswood and Shirley. Some services extend to/from Great Malvern with early morning services starting at Birmingham Snow Hill. Some services start/terminate or call at Worcester Shrub Hill instead or in addition to Worcester Foregate Street. Services only run between 09:30 and 19:45. Journeys to stations via Dorridge and Solihull can be made using Chiltern Railways services changing at Hatton or Warwick. A more expensive ticket is also available which allows travel via Tyseley.

=== Chiltern Railways ===
Wilmcote is also served by approximately one train every 2 hours, to Leamington Spa via Hatton and Warwick along the Leamington-Stratford line and to Stratford-upon-Avon. On weekdays, during the afternoon peak, in order to run additional services some trains start/terminate at Hatton or Warwick where connections are available for Leamington Spa and onwards to London Marylebone. Some services extend to Banbury or London Marylebone. Some Chiltern Railways services do not call here and run non stop between Stratford-upon-Avon and Hatton or Warwick

Sunday services only run from 09:40 with the final departure at 20:43.

== Incidents ==
On 24 March 1922, four track workers were killed after being hit by a light engine just south of the station. They were buried side-by-side in St Andrew's churchyard, Wilmcote, with a single headstone, which is extant, and individual grave marker stones. The incident became the subject of an in-depth academic study by the Railway Work, Life and Death project at Portsmouth University, leading up to its centenary. Edward Booker, the son of one of the victims, later served as Wilmcote's stationmaster. A commemorative event was held at the station, on the day of the centenary.

Preceding station	National Rail	Following station
Bearley	Chiltern Railways Leamington Spa-Stratford-upon-Avon	Stratford-upon-Avon Parkway
Wootton Wawen	West Midlands Railway Kidderminster-Stratford-upon-Avon via Shirley	Stratford-upon-Avon Parkway
Lapworth	West Midlands Railway Kidderminster-Stratford-upon-Avon via Solihull Limited service	Stratford-upon-Avon Parkway
Bearley	West Midlands Railway Kidderminster-Stratford-upon-Avon via Solihull Limited service	Stratford-upon-Avon Parkway
