= Bearley railway station =

Railway station in Warwickshire, England

Coordinates: 52°14′42″N 1°44′59″W

Bearley
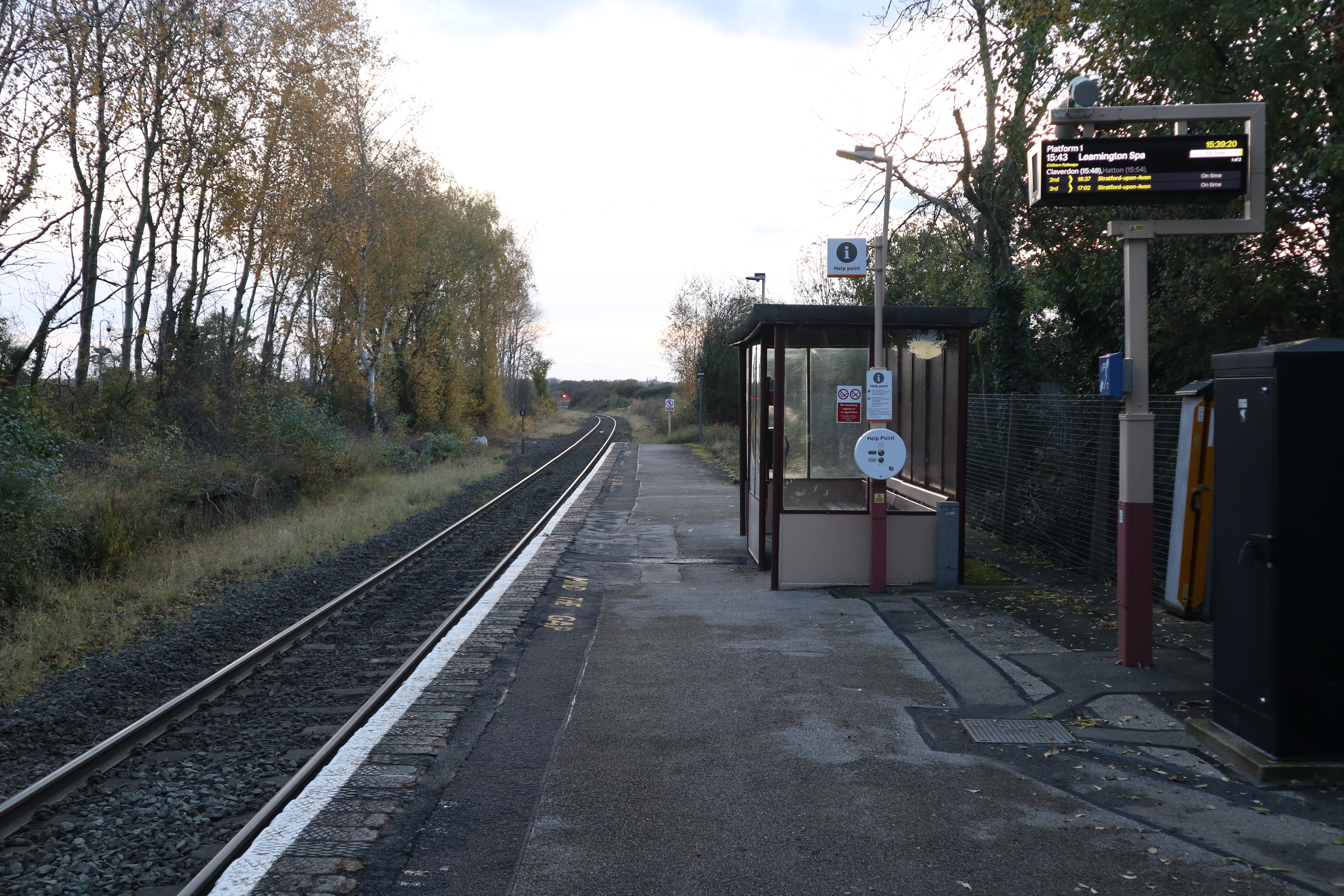
- Bearley Station in 2023 looking Southbound towards Stratford-upon-Avon.

General information
- Location: Bearley, Stratford-on-Avon; England
- Grid reference: SP171607
- Manager: West Midlands Railway
- Platforms: 1

Other information
- Station code: BER
- Classification: DfT category F2

Passengers
- 2021/22: ▲1,394
- 2022/23: ▼1,380
- 2023/24: ▲1,766
- 2024/25: ▲2,552
- 2025/26: ▲3,018
Location
Notes
- Passenger statistics from the Office of Rail and Road

Bearley railway station serves the village of Bearley in South Warwickshire, England. It is on the Leamington–Stratford line. Today it is an unstaffed rural halt, managed by West Midlands Railway.

Bearley was once a junction station (a branch line to Alcester met the Stratford-upon-Avon to Hatton line here). The station dates from 1860, when it opened as part of the Stratford on Avon Railway's Hatton to Stratford branch line - the Alcester branch was added in 1876, but this closed in 1951. Originally a single track station, the line was doubled in 1939 and a second platform built; it reverted to its current status in 1969 when the line was reduced to single track once more.

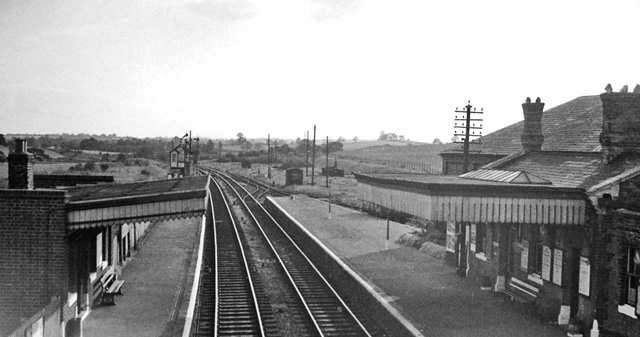
The station in 1963

== Facilities ==
Bearley station is unstaffed. Tickets must be purchased from the senior conductor or train manager on the train.

There is a small parking area available by the station entrance. Parking is free for rail users.

Step free access is available between the entrance and the platform.

== Services ==
The station is served on Mondays to Saturdays by Chiltern Railways and West Midlands Trains on the Leamington–Stratford line.

The typical Monday to Friday service is as follows:

Westbound:

- 3 trains per day to Worcester Foregate Street via Birmingham Snow Hill. Operated by West Midlands Railway.

Eastbound:

- 1 train every 2 hours to Leamington Spa via Hatton and Warwick. Operated by Chiltern Railways. Last train of the day extends to London Marylebone.

Southbound:

- 1 train every 2 hours to Stratford-upon-Avon. Operated by Chiltern Railways.
- 2 trains per day to Stratford-upon-Avon. Operated by West Midlands Railway.

On Saturdays, 5 West Midlands Railway services to Stratford-upon-Avon call at the station, alongside a two-hourly Chiltern service. 4 WMR services run towards Worcester, while Chiltern provides a service every 2 hours to Leamington Spa.

West Midlands Railway services mainly run during the weekday morning and evening peak and on Saturday morning and evening. All other West Midlands Railway services pass through without stopping.

All West Midlands Railway services that serve Bearley do so only upon request. Chiltern Railways services serve Bearley as scheduled stops.

There is no Sunday service at Bearley. The nearest stations with a Sunday service are Wilmcote and Wootton Wawen.

Some Chiltern Railways services do not call here and run non stop between Stratford-upon-Avon and Hatton or Warwick.

Preceding station	National Rail	Following station
Claverdon	Chiltern Railways Leamington Spa – Stratford-upon-Avon	Wilmcote
Claverdon stops on request	West Midlands Railway Worcester — Birmingham — Stratford-upon-Avon via Solihull; Limited service	Wilmcote
	Disused railways	
Aston Cantlow Halt	Great Western Railway; Alcester to Hatton Branch	Claverdon
