= Edstone Aqueduct =

Aqueduct in Wootton Wawen, Warwickshire, England

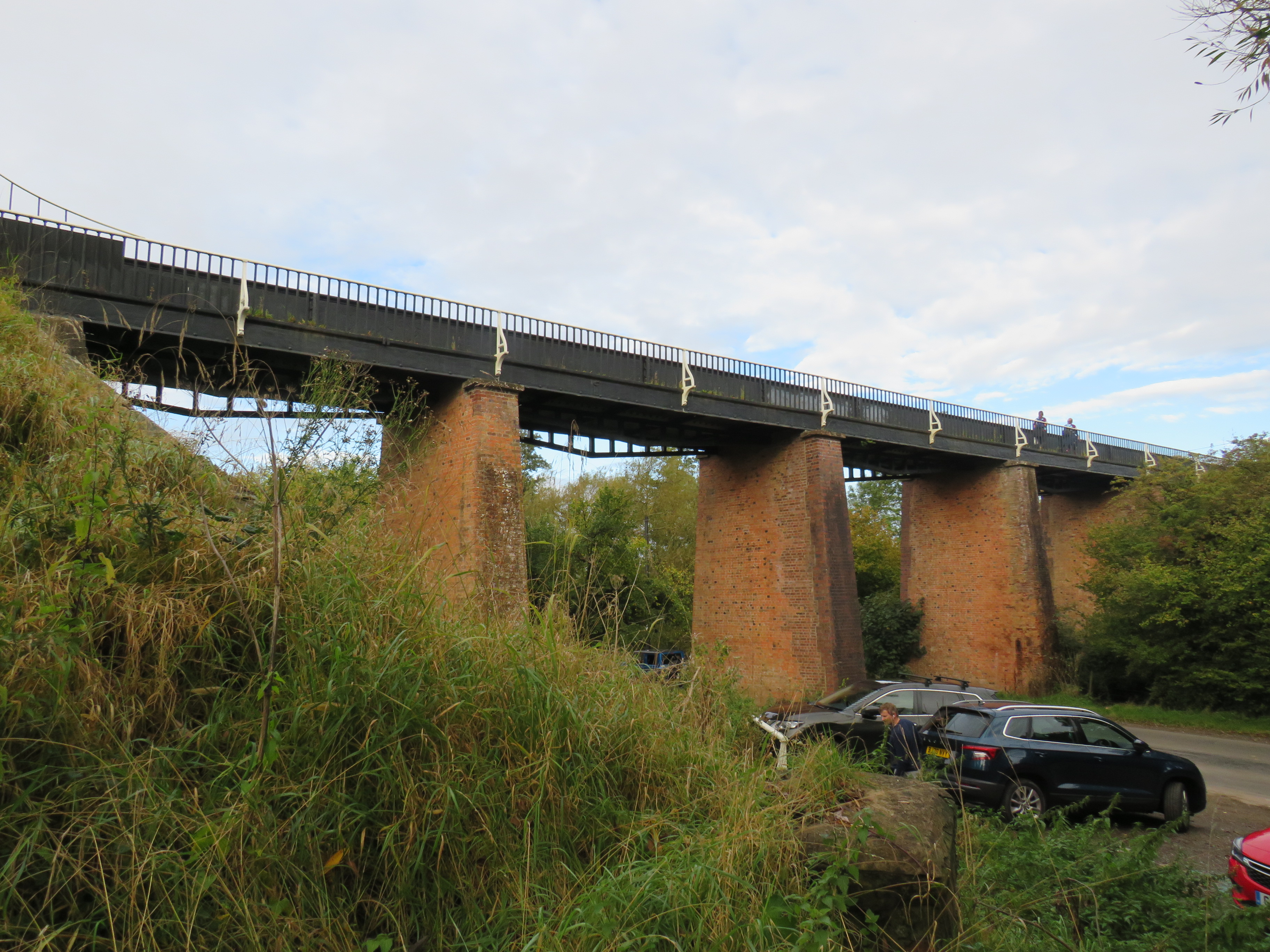
- The aqueduct from the ground
- Interactive map of Edstone Aqueduct
- Location: Aston Cantlow/Wootton Wawen, Warwickshire, England
- Coordinates: 52.2464°N 1.7641°W

Listed Building – Grade II*
- Official name: Aqueduct, Stratford on Avon Canal
- Designated: 23 October 1985
- Reference no.: 1024550

Edstone Aqueduct is one of three aqueducts on a 4-mile (6 km) length of the Stratford-upon-Avon Canal in Warwickshire. At 475 feet (145 m), Edstone is the longest cast iron aqueduct in England. It crosses a minor road, a stream, and a field, a railway line (the North Warwickshire Line) and the trackbed of the disused Alcester branch line. There was once a pipe from the side of the canal that enabled steam locomotives to draw water to fill their tanks.

The aqueduct was built between 1812 and 1816 and is an early example of a prefabricated structure. Its cast iron trough is formed of 35 separate sections bolted together, which sits on thirteen brick piers, creating 14 spans. The trough is 2.7 metres (8.9 ft) wide, and 1.5 metres (4.9 ft) deep. The towpath is set level with the base of the trough, which is a somewhat unusual design feature. It was threatened with closure in 1958 along with the entire canal, but was saved by enthusiasts in the 1960s.

The aqueduct became a grade II* listed structure in 1985.

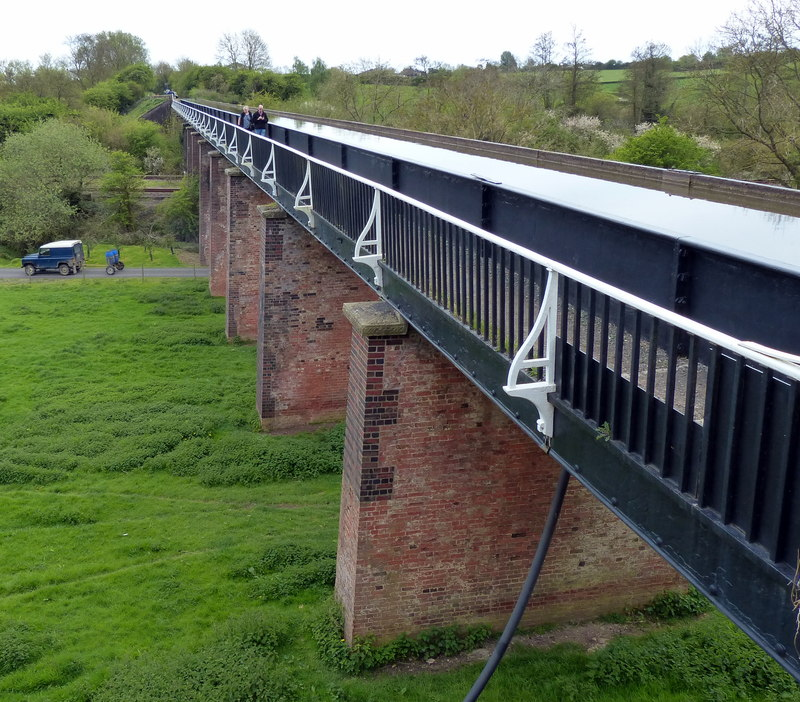
Edstone Aqueduct, from the top

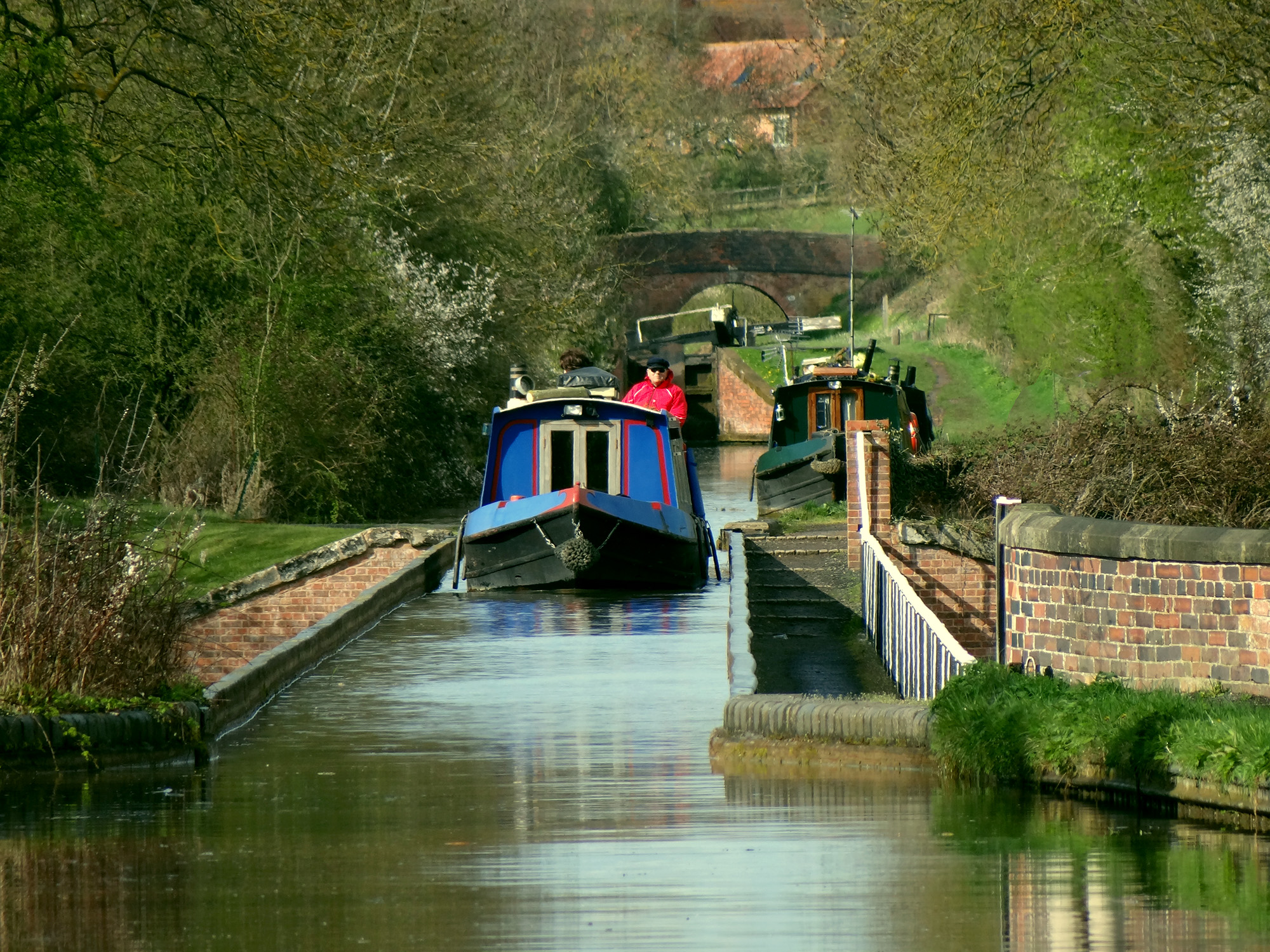
Edstone Aqueduct From South. Bearley Lock in the distance. April 2012

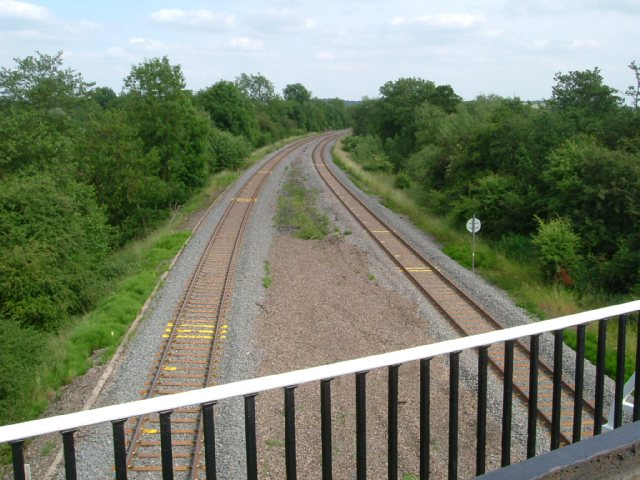
The railway line passing under the aqueduct.

== See also ==
- List of canal aqueducts in the United Kingdom
