= Wootton Wawen railway station =

Railway station in Warwickshire, England

Coordinates: 52.266°N 1.785°W

Wootton Wawen
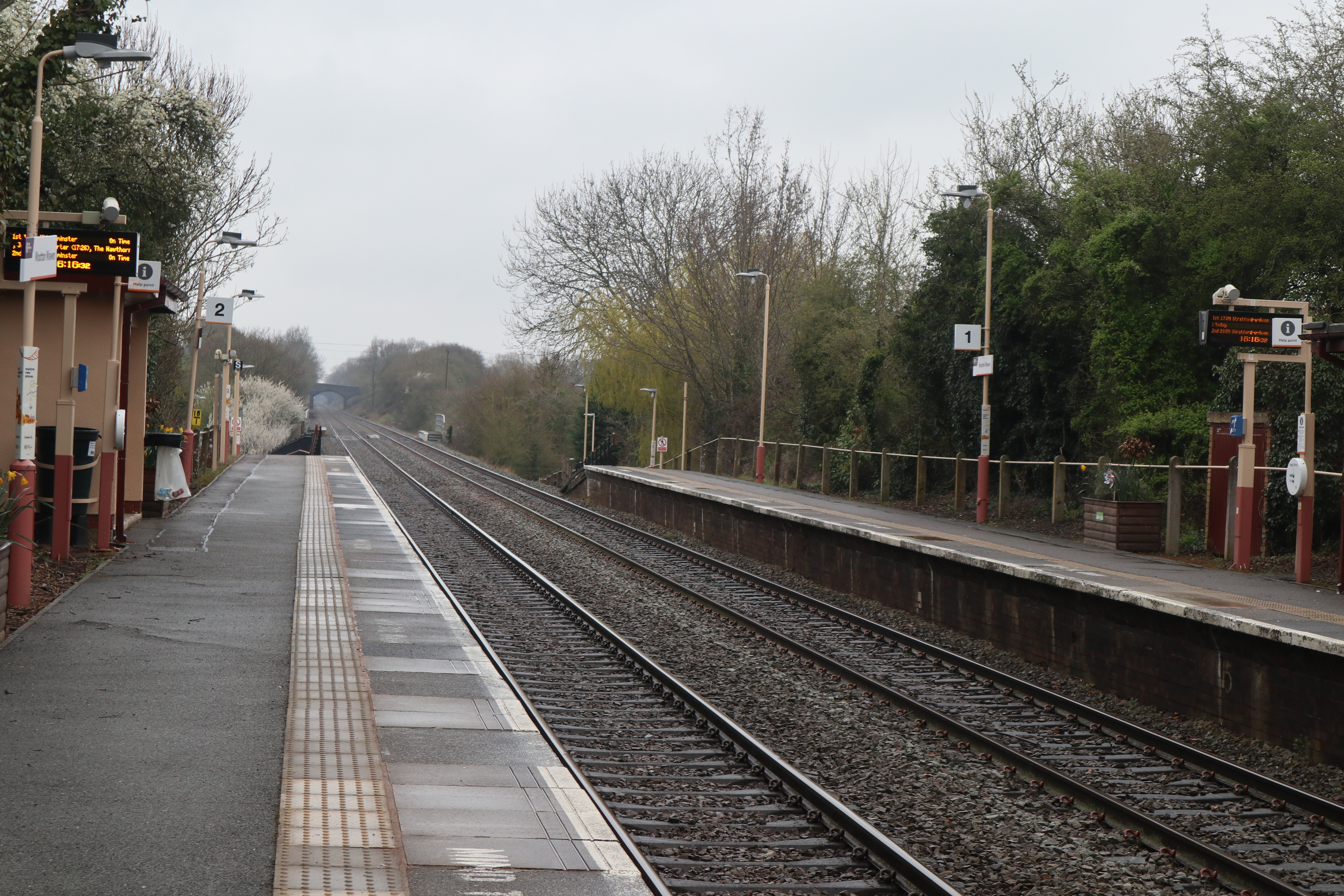
- Wootton Wawen station in April 2023

General information
- Location: Wootton Wawen, Stratford-on-Avon; England
- Grid reference: SP147631
- Manager: West Midlands Trains
- Platforms: 2

Other information
- Station code: WWW
- Classification: DfT category F2

History
- Opened: 1908

Passengers
- 2021/22: ▲10,534
- 2022/23: ▲11,042
- 2023/24: ▲12,432
- 2024/25: ▲19,398
- 2025/26: ▲27,290
Location
Notes
- Passenger statistics from the Office of Rail and Road

Wootton Wawen railway station serves the village of Wootton Wawen in Warwickshire, England. It is served by trains between Kidderminster and Stratford-upon-Avon via Birmingham.

The station was renamed from Wootton Wawen Platform to Wootton Wawen on 6 May 1974. Under British Rail, the station was threatened with closure in 1985 (along with the line between Henley-in-Arden and Bearley Junction). The plans were dropped in 1987 and the line remains open.

== Services ==
The service in each direction between Kidderminster and Stratford-Upon-Avon via Birmingham Snow Hill and Stourbridge Junction runs hourly every day including Sunday. Until the May 2023 timetable change it was a request stop, meaning that passengers wishing to board a train here needed to signal their intent to board to the driver, and that those wishing to alight here needed to inform the train conductor.

A normal service operates on most Bank holidays.

Preceding station	National Rail	Following station
Henley-in-Arden	West Midlands Railway; North Warwickshire Line	Wilmcote
