= Claverdon railway station =

Railway station serving Claverdon, England

Coordinates: 52°16′38″N 1°41′47″W

Claverdon
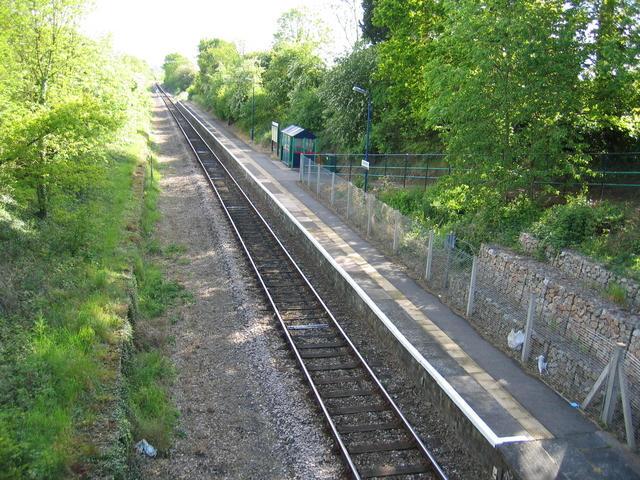
- Claverdon railway station in 2005

General information
- Location: Claverdon, Stratford-on-Avon; England
- Grid reference: SP208643
- Manager: West Midlands Railway
- Platforms: 1

Other information
- Station code: CLV
- Classification: DfT category F2

Passengers
- 2021/22: ▲2,386
- 2022/23: ▲3,172
- 2023/24: ▲6,336
- 2024/25: ▲7,820
- 2025/26: ▼7,804
Location
Notes
- Passenger statistics from the Office of Rail and Road

Claverdon railway station serves the village of Claverdon in Warwickshire, England. It is managed by West Midlands Railway, although most of the services from the station are operated by Chiltern Railways.

The line on which the station stands was opened by the Stratford on Avon Railway as a single-track branch in 1860, but was doubled between Bearley and Hatton in 1938 and a new two-platform station was built at Claverdon. When the second track was lifted in 1969 Claverdon reverted to being a single-platform station.

== Services ==
The station is served on Mondays to Saturdays by Chiltern Railways and West Midlands Trains on the Leamington–Stratford line.

The typical Monday to Friday service is as follows:

Westbound:

- 3 trains per day to Worcester Foregate Street via Birmingham Snow Hill. Operated by West Midlands Railway.

Eastbound:

- 1 train every 2 hours to Leamington Spa. Operated by Chiltern Railways. Last train of the day extends to London Marylebone.

Southbound:

- 1 train every 2 hours to Stratford-upon-Avon. Operated by Chiltern Railways.
- 2 trains per day to Stratford-upon-Avon. Operated by West Midlands Railway.

On Saturdays, 5 West Midlands Railway services to Stratford-upon-Avon call at the station, alongside a two-hourly Chiltern service. 4 WMR services run towards Worcester, while Chiltern provides a service every 2 hours to Leamington Spa.

There is no Sunday service.

All West Midlands Railway services that serve Claverdon do so only upon request. Chiltern Railways services serve Claverdon as scheduled stops.

Preceding station	National Rail	Following station
Hatton	Chiltern Railways; Leamington Spa – Stratford-upon-Avon	Bearley
Lapworth	West Midlands Railway Worcester — Birmingham — Stratford-upon-Avon via Solihull; Limited service	Bearley stops on request
