= Stratford-upon-Avon Parkway railway station =

Railway station in Warwickshire, England

Coordinates: 52.2072°N 1.7309°W

Stratford-upon-Avon Parkway
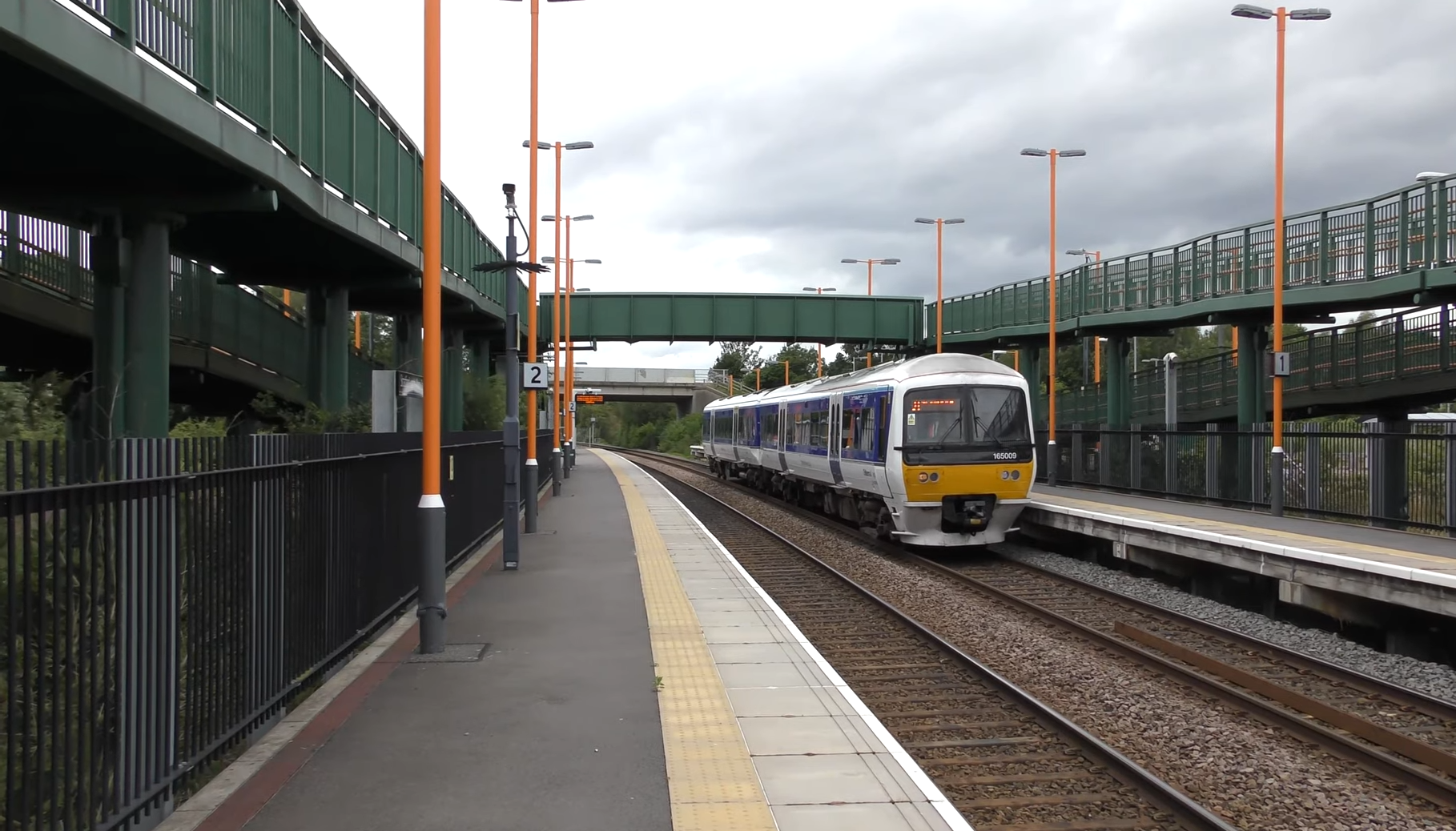
- Stratford-upon-Avon Parkway in 2020

General information
- Location: Stratford-upon-Avon, Stratford-on-Avon; England
- Grid reference: SP183566
- Manager: West Midlands Trains
- Platforms: 2

Other information
- Station code: STY

History
- Opened: 19 May 2013

Passengers
- 2021/22: ▲54,602
- 2022/23: ▲73,066
- 2023/24: ▲88,666
- 2024/25: ▲109,072
- 2025/26: ▲118,582
Location
Notes
- Passenger statistics from the Office of Rail and Road

Stratford-upon-Avon Parkway is a railway station located on the northern outskirts of the market town of Stratford-upon-Avon in Warwickshire, England. It is on the North Warwickshire Line, adjacent to the A46.

The station is served by West Midlands Railway and Chiltern Railways, and consists of two platforms on either side of the track, which are linked by a DDA compliant footbridge with ramps. It makes use of the Park and Ride facilities at Bishopton, which can occupy up to 725 vehicles.

== History ==
The station was intended to open in December 2013, however it was completed several months ahead of schedule and opened on 19 May 2013. Construction work commenced on 17 October 2012.

It was projected that development of the station would cost £8.8 million. In July 2011, the Department for Transport agreed to contribute £5 million under the Local Sustainable Transport Fund. In September 2011, Warwickshire County Council agreed to contribute £1.8 million, and later announced that Mott MacDonald had been appointed to produce the GRIP 4 outline design of the parkway station.

== Facilities ==
There is a ticket machine outside the entrance to platform 1 which accepts card payments only - cash and voucher payments can be made to the senior conductor on the train.

Cycle parking is available.

Step free access is available between the platforms via the ramp. The station is unstaffed. Information is available from help points located on both platforms and from the senior conductor on the train.

== Services ==
=== West Midlands Railway ===
2 trains per hour run westbound to Kidderminster via Birmingham Snow Hill, Smethwick Galton Bridge and Stourbridge Junction, with one service running via Earlswood and Shirley on the North Warwickshire Line before terminating at Kidderminster. The other service runs via Dorridge and Solihull on its way to Worcester Foregate Street via Droitwich Spa.

2tph run southbound to Stratford-upon-Avon only.

Some trains, mainly evening services, call at Worcester Shrub Hill. Some early morning and late night services start/terminate at Stourbridge Junction, Birmingham Snow Hill or Birmingham Moor Street.

On Sundays there is an hourly service to Worcester Foregate Street via Birmingham Snow Hill and Kidderminster northbound and to Stratford-upon-Avon southbound. All services run via Earlswood and Shirley. Early morning services start at Birmingham Snow Hill. Some services start/terminate or call at Worcester Shrub Hill instead or in addition to Worcester Foregate Street. Sunday services run only between 09:00 and 19:30.

Journeys to stations via Dorridge and Solihull can be made using Chiltern Railways services by changing at Hatton or Warwick.

A more expensive ticket is also available which allows travel via Tyseley.

=== Chiltern Railways ===
Stratford-upon-Avon is also served by approximately one train every 2 hours, to Leamington Spa via Hatton and Warwick along the Leamington-Stratford line and to Stratford-upon-Avon. On weekdays, during the afternoon peak, in order to run additional services some trains start/terminate at Hatton or Warwick where connections are available for Leamington Spa and onwards to London Marylebone. Some services extend to Banbury or London Marylebone. In the hour which the direct service does not run, on Monday-Saturday, connections to Hatton, Warwick and Leamington Spa can be made using West Midlands Railway services and changing at Dorridge for onwards Chiltern Railways services. Some Chiltern Railways services do not call here and run non stop between Stratford-upon-Avon and Hatton or Warwick.

Sunday services only run from 09:40 with the final departure at 20:40.

Preceding station	National Rail	Following station
Wilmcote	West Midlands Railway; Worcester-Kidderminster-Birmingham–Stratford-upon-Avon	Stratford-upon-Avon
Wilmcote	Chiltern Railways; Leamington Spa-Stratford-upon-Avon	Stratford-upon-Avon
