= Hatton railway station (England) =

Railway station in Warwickshire, England

Coordinates: 52.2952°N 1.6730°W

Hatton
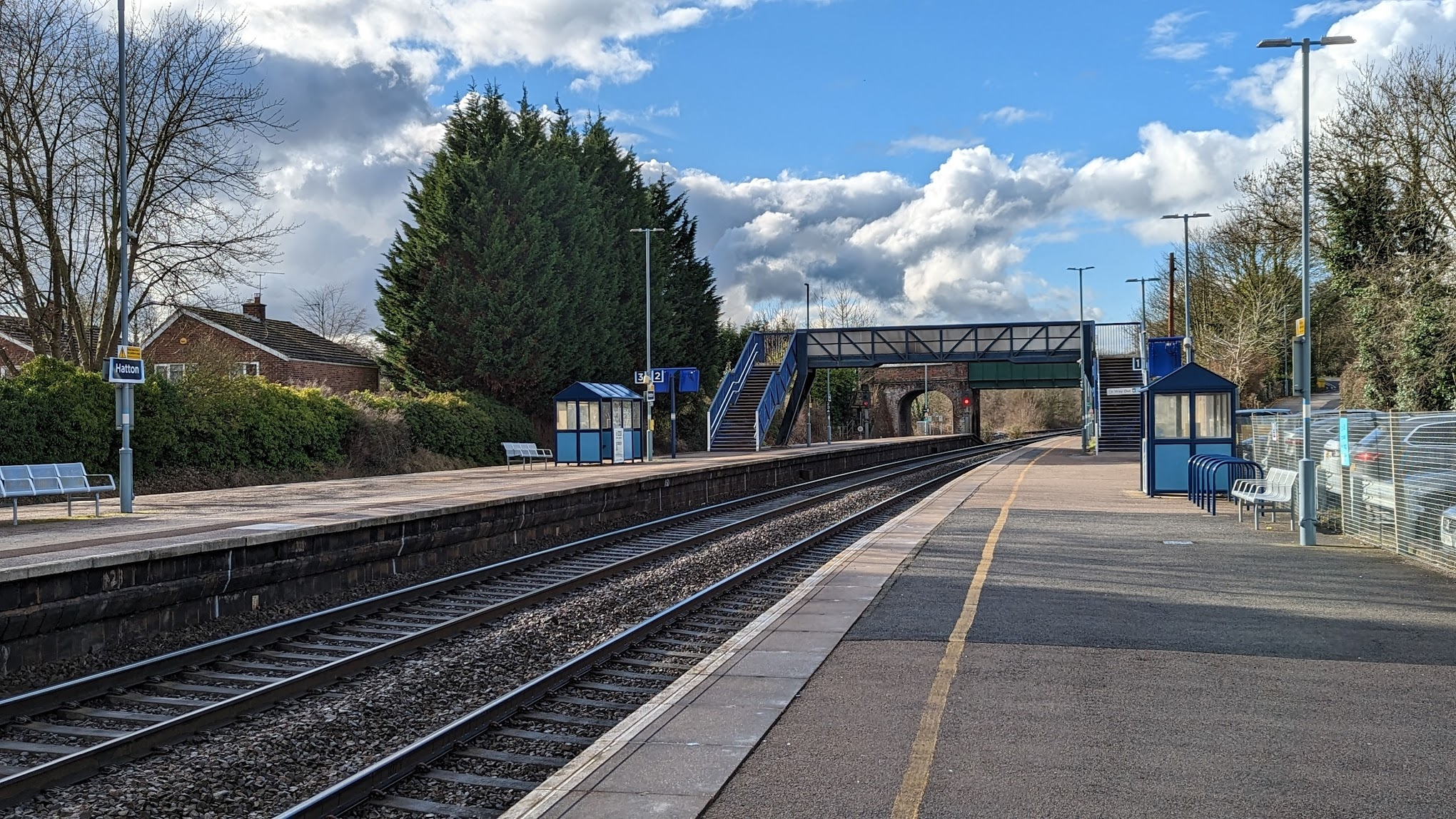
- Hatton railway station in 2023 looking Northwards.

General information
- Location: Shrewley, Warwick; England
- Grid reference: SP224663
- Manager: Chiltern Railways
- Platforms: 3

Other information
- Station code: HTN
- Classification: DfT category F1

History
- Opened: 1852

Passengers
- 2021/22: ▲51,736
- 2022/23: ▲78,188
- 2023/24: ▲86,724
- 2024/25: ▼34,912
- 2025/26: ▲38,418
Location
Notes
- Passenger statistics from the Office of Rail and Road

Hatton railway station takes the name of the village of Hatton in Warwickshire, England, although it is about 1 mile (1.6 km) from the village. It is situated in the linear settlement of the same name (Hatton Station), that evolved around the station, mainly in the 1950s and 1960s. Other close settlements are Little Shrewley and Shrewley. The station is managed by Chiltern Railways.

Hatton is the junction station at which the lines from Leamington Spa to Stratford-upon-Avon and Birmingham diverge. The station is unstaffed; there is one ticket machine located at the single entrance to the station on the London-bound (southbound) platform. There is a small shelter on Platform 1 (southbound – for trains from Birmingham to Leamington Spa) and also one on the island platform, which consists of Platforms 2 and 3 (Platform 2 is for Birmingham-bound services and Platform 3 is for stations from/to Stratford upon Avon, which bear to the west immediately north of the station. Trains can, however, use both Platforms 2 and 3 to reach Birmingham, as just outside the station, the lines re-join). A footbridge links Platform 1 with island Platform 2/3.

Each platform at the station is equipped with a real-time electronic information departure screen.

== History ==
The station dates from 1852 (being opened by the Birmingham and Oxford Junction Railway), with the branch to Stratford opening in 1860 (this had a later extension, now closed, from Bearley Junction to Alcester added in 1876).

It sits part way along a 5-mile (8 km) long rising section of line with a ruling gradient of 1 in 110 for northbound trains known as Hatton Bank – this section was often difficult to negotiate for heavy freights and the use of banking engines was commonplace.

The station had its platforms extended in 1892 and again in 1897, along with the buildings improved and additional sidings were added in July 1897. Further remodelling of the track in the area would follow over the next two decades. The refuge sidings were converted in to goods loops in June 1901 with the long goods line from Budbrook to Hatton being extended to 2¼ miles in May 1914 to the Budbrook and Warwick Cold Store.

The engine turntable was removed in 1913. By 1939 the branch had been doubled, but the western end to Alcester was closed in 1951 and it reverted to single track in 1969, during which time signalling control was transferred to the newly commissioned panel box at Saltley in 1961. The long siding to the Budbrook and Warwick Cold Store was closed in 1969.

== Services ==
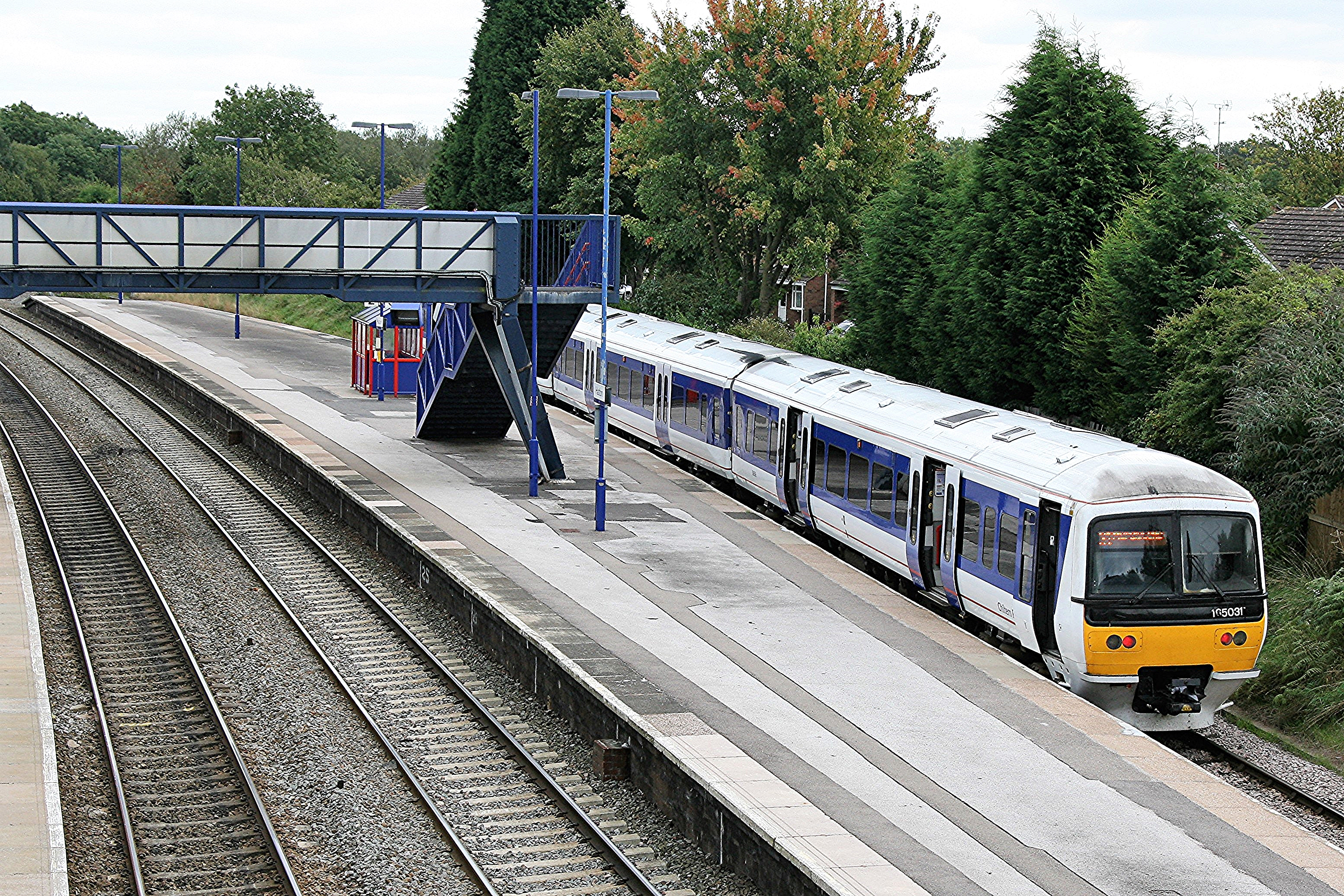
A Chiltern Railways Class 165 at the station.

Most services calling at Hatton are operated by Chiltern Railways.

The current typical off-peak service is as follows:

- 1 train per hour to Leamington Spa
- 1 train every 2 hours to Birmingham Moor Street
- 1 train every 2 hours to Stratford-upon-Avon.

Additionally, some Chiltern Railways services to/from London Marylebone call at Hatton. As of December 2023 there are four southbound and three northbound such services, primarily in the evening.

Three West Midlands Railway services on Snow Hill lines services also call at Hatton during peak times, as well as at the very start and end of the day. An early morning service runs to Worcester Foregate Street, with two evening services running to Leamington Spa.

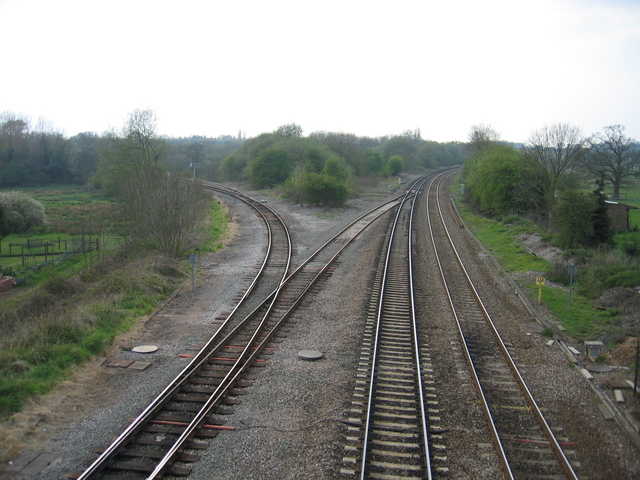
Hatton Junction, just west of the station, where the branch line to Stratford (left) diverges from the main line to Birmingham (right)

Preceding station	National Rail	Following station
Claverdon	Chiltern Railways Leamington–Stratford line	Warwick
Lapworth	Chiltern Railways Chiltern Main Line	Warwick Parkway
Lapworth	West Midlands Railway Snow Hill lines Limited service	Warwick Parkway
B&WCS corporate siding	BR (Budbrook long siding) (1945–1969)	Terminus
B&WCS corporate siding	GWR (Budbrook long siding) (1923–1945)	Terminus
B&WCS corporate siding	B&OJ (Budbrook long siding) (1901–1923)	Terminus
