= Bearley =

Village and civil parish in Warwickshire, England

Coordinates: 52.243°N 1.737°W

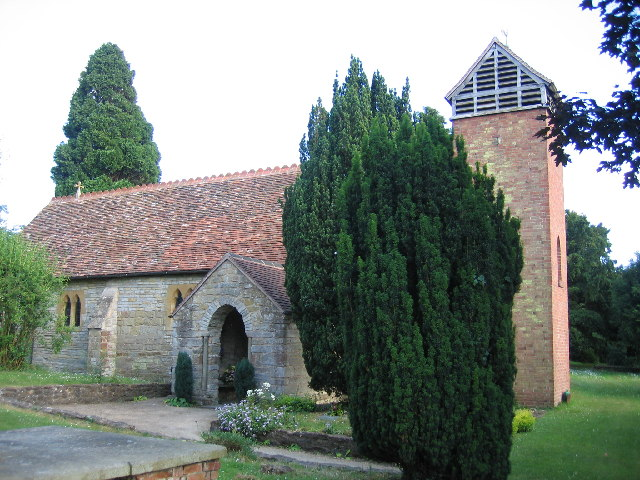
- Bearley, St Mary the Virgin

- Location within Warwickshire
- Population: 724 (2011 Census)
- OS grid reference: SP180605
- District: Stratford-on-Avon
- Shire county: Warwickshire
- Region: West Midlands
- Country: England
- Sovereign state: United Kingdom
- Post town: STRATFORD-UPON-AVON
- Postcode district: CV37
- Police: Warwickshire
- Fire: Warwickshire
- Ambulance: West Midlands

Bearley /ˈbɪərlɪ/ is a village and civil parish in the Stratford-on-Avon district of Warwickshire, England. The village is about five miles (8 km) north of Stratford-upon-Avon, bounded on the north by Wootton Wawen, on the east by Snitterfield, and on the south and west by Aston Cantlow. The western boundary is formed by a stream running out of Edstone Lake; it would seem that the land, now part of Edstone in Wootton Wawen, between the stream where it flows west from the lake and the road running east from Bearley Cross, was originally included in Bearley. The land within the parish rises gradually from a height of 216 ft (66 m), in the north-west at Bearley Cross, to about 370 ft (110 m), at the south-east corner of the parish, and is open except along its eastern boundary, where part of the extensive wood known as Snitterfield Bushes is included in Bearley.

At Bearley Cross the road running west to Alcester and east to Warwick is crossed by the main road running north-west from Stratford-upon-Avon to Henley-in-Arden. To the south of the Cross and the station a road runs south-east from the Stratford road, passing the Grange and the Manor House, to the church. This seems to be the Saltereswey which in 1249 formed one of the limits of the demesnes of Bearley, the others being the high road from Stratford to Henley and the Lochamwey, which may be identified with the road, passing the Methodist chapel, connecting the other two roads. At the 2001 Census the population was 758, falling to 724 at the 2011 Census.

== History ==
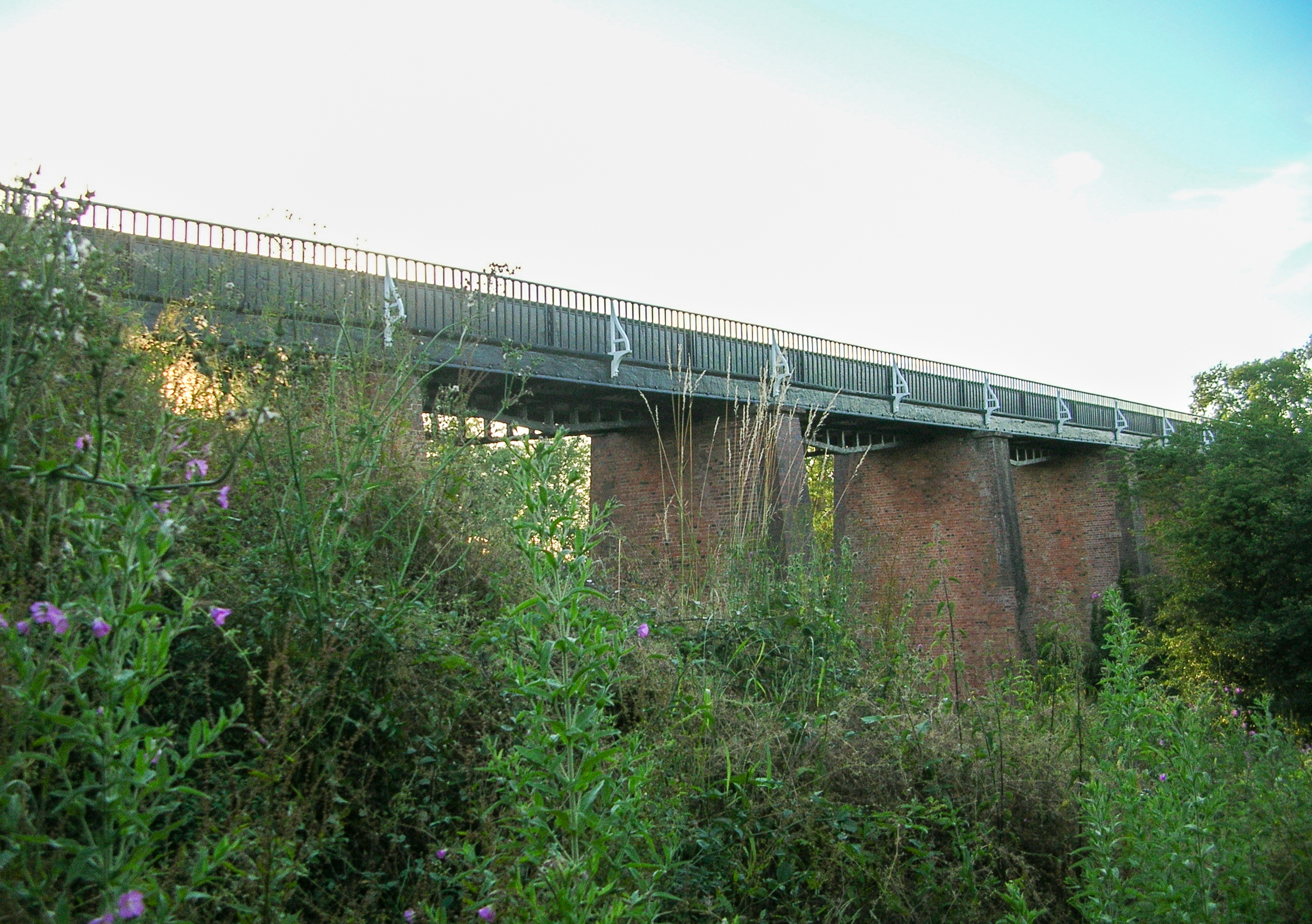

The name is first recorded as Burlei in 1086 and is from Old English burh + leah 'woodland clearing near a fortified place.' Bearley is recorded in the Domesday Book where its 5 hides were split, 4 being held by William son of Courbucion who holds "in Bearley 4 hides. Land for 4 ploughs. In Lordship 1; 2 slaves; 9 villagers and 6 smallholders with 5 ploughs. Meadow, 4 acres; in Warwick 1 house which pays 8d. The value was 60s; now 40s. Ernwin and his mother held it freely." and 1 hide as part of the lands of Robert of Stafford " Alric holds 1 hide in Bearley. Land for 1 plough. 1 villager and 1 slave. Meadow 1 acre. The value was 20s; now 10s. He also held it (before 1066)." About 1175 this 1 hide was in the tenure of Hervey de Stratton, who with his son Richard remitted his rights therein to his overlord Robert de Stafford, grandson of the Domesday Robert who granted it to Bordesley Abbey. Upon the Dissolution of the Monasteries it came to Clement Throckmorton who later sold it William Walter who passed it to Mr Fanshaw.

== Governance ==
Bearley is part of the Wootton Wawen ward of Stratford-on-Avon District Council and represented by Councillor Ian Shenton, Conservative Party. Nationally it is part of Stratford-on-Avon parliamentary constituency, whose current Member of Parliament following the 2024 general election is Manuela Perteghella of the Liberal Democrat Party. Before Brexit in 2020 it was part of the West Midlands electoral region of the European Parliament.

== Economy ==
The village is home to Bearley Vineyard, a three-acre, family run vineyard that produces white, rosé and red English wines. It was established in 2005 and has since won numerous regional and national awards including The Best Red Wine in Mercia for the Pinot Noir Précoce 2009, and The Best Rosé Wine in Mercia for the Rosé 2010. There is limited local employment: light industry, retail, a nursing home, agriculture and livestock farming. Most of the working population has jobs further afield in Stratford-upon-Avon, and in the conurbations of Redditch, Birmingham and Coventry. The village shop and post office closed in 2001. The nearest facilities are in Snitterfield.

== Notable buildings ==
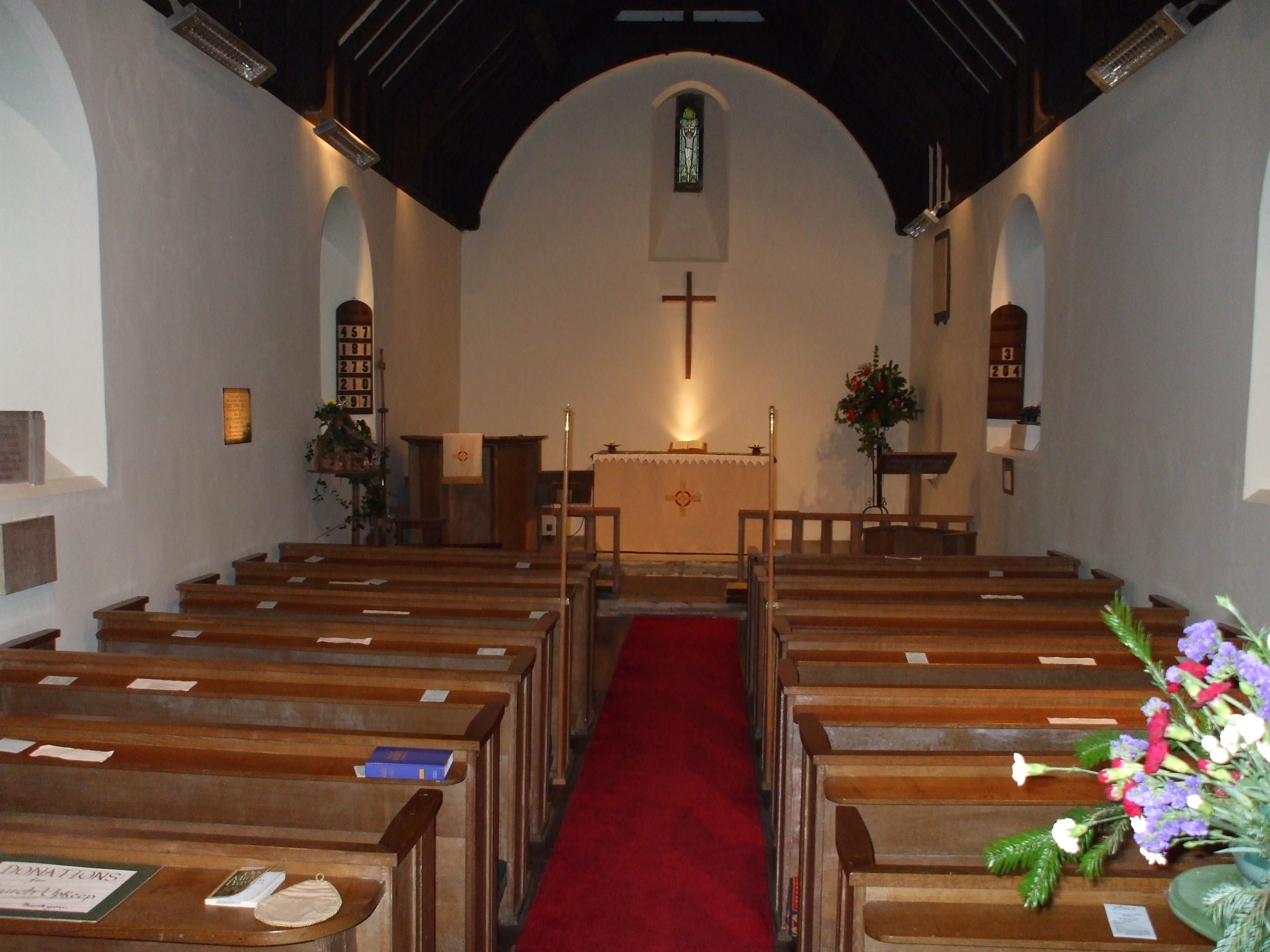
St Mary The Virgin View of the Nave and Chancel

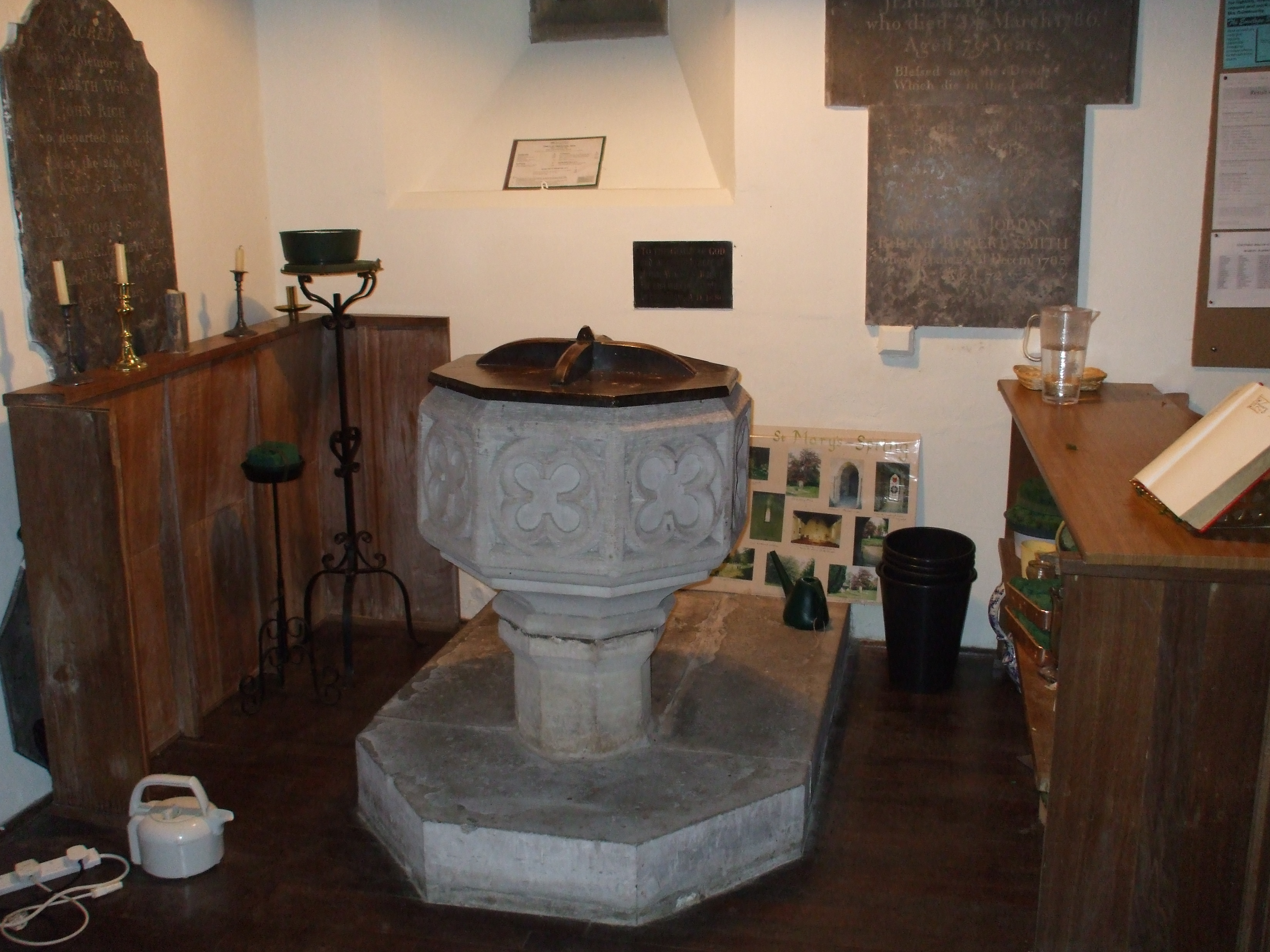
The Font

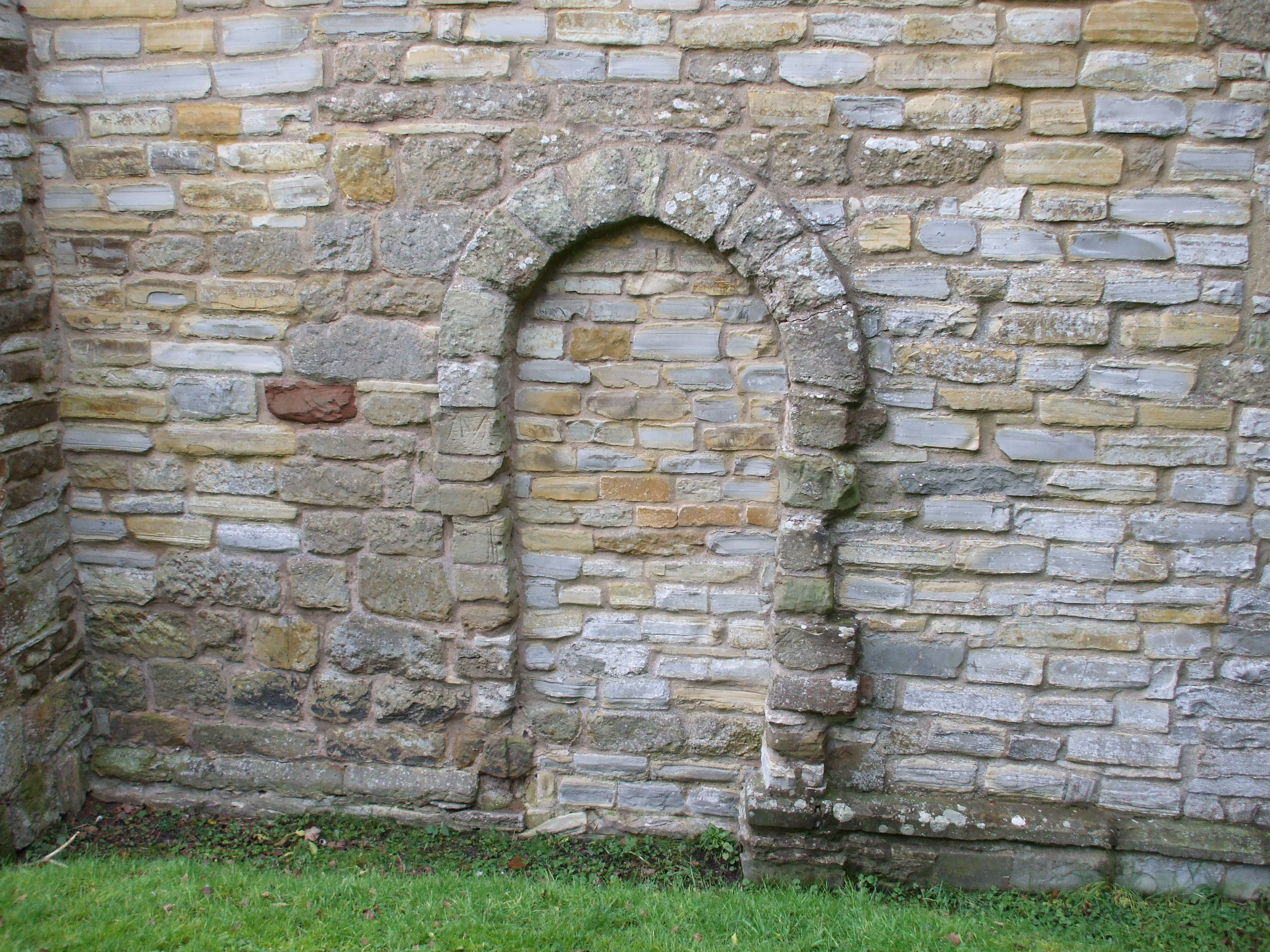
Blocked 12th century doorway

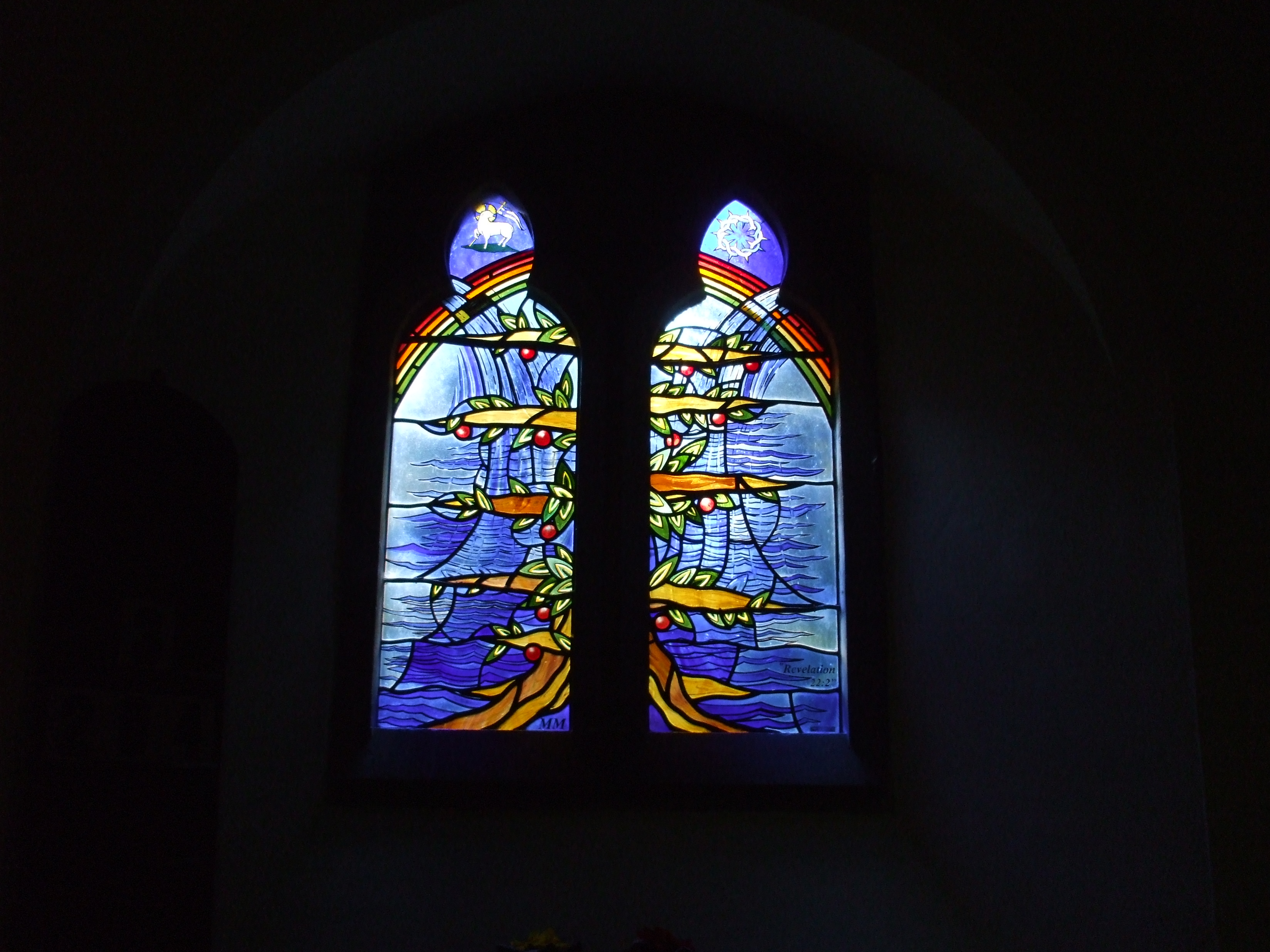
Millennium Window

The parish church of St. Mary The Virgin has been largely rebuilt in modern times, but the nave dates probably from the end of the 12th century and the chancel with its thinner walls may be of the 13th or 14th century. Much of the upper part of the walling is modern, also all the windows. The nave was lengthened about 10 ft (3.0 m). and the western porch and bell-turret was added early in the 19th century. The plan is a plain rectangle about 55½ ft. long inside, of which about 20½ ft. is the chancel, by 15½ ft. The chancel walls are 2 ft 3 in (0.69 m) thick, built of blue lias rubble, mostly squared in the lower parts and with sandstone angle-dressings. It is probable the north wall has been partly rebuilt. The east window is a single light set high up, by John Hardman in 1886, but there is patching for a former lower window.

The north and south windows are of two lights and were also formerly lower in the walls. About a yard east of them are short straight joints and pieces of sandstone that may indicate former windows. The nave has side walls 2 ft 9 in (0.84 m) thick; the lower halves of them are of early shaly rubble with wide jointing, and above this are medieval sandstone courses. The north and south windows are of two lights and both have patchings below them for lower windows. In the north wall are the remains of a 12th-century doorway of sandstone, now blocked: it has jambs of two orders, the inner with an edge-roll; the outer is square and had nook-shafts, which have disappeared except for the western capital; this is of cushion form with chevron ornament.

The head is pointed and of one square order, probably a later alteration. In the south wall is another blocked doorway with square pilaster-jambs and pointed head, perhaps of the 13th century but difficult to date. The two buttresses to each wall are medieval. The west wall and porch-tower are of red brick. The bell-cote is of wood. The main roof is tiled. One of the three bells is medieval. There is now a single bell by Wm Blews inscribed MARIA, fleur de Lys, Queen, King, fleur de lys MARIA that was made by re-casting two bells when the building was re-modelled in 1875. The Millennium Window by Art of Glass, Earlswood (River of the Water of Life) 2001 donated by Audrey Payne in memory of her late husband.

== Sports and leisure ==
Like many other rural villages that are within commuting distance of large cities, Bearley has become a dormitory village for many residents. The village has a WI group, a garden club, a short mat bowls club, as well as cricket and football teams. Snitterfield bushes, a Site of Special Scientific Interest (SSSI) managed by the Warwickshire Wildlife Trust, lies 1.2 miles (2 km) east of Bearley.

== Transport links ==
The longest aqueduct in England, the Edstone Aqueduct, is just outside Bearley on the Stratford-upon-Avon Canal. Bearley railway station is a halt on the Leamington–Stratford line.
