= Slocock =

Slocock is an English surname. Notable people with the surname include:

- Caroline Slocock, British civil servant and author, first female private secretary at 10 Downing Street
- Lancelot Slocock (1886–1916), rugby union international who represented England
- Winifred McNair (1877–1954), née Slocock, English tennis player
