= Yarningale Aqueduct =

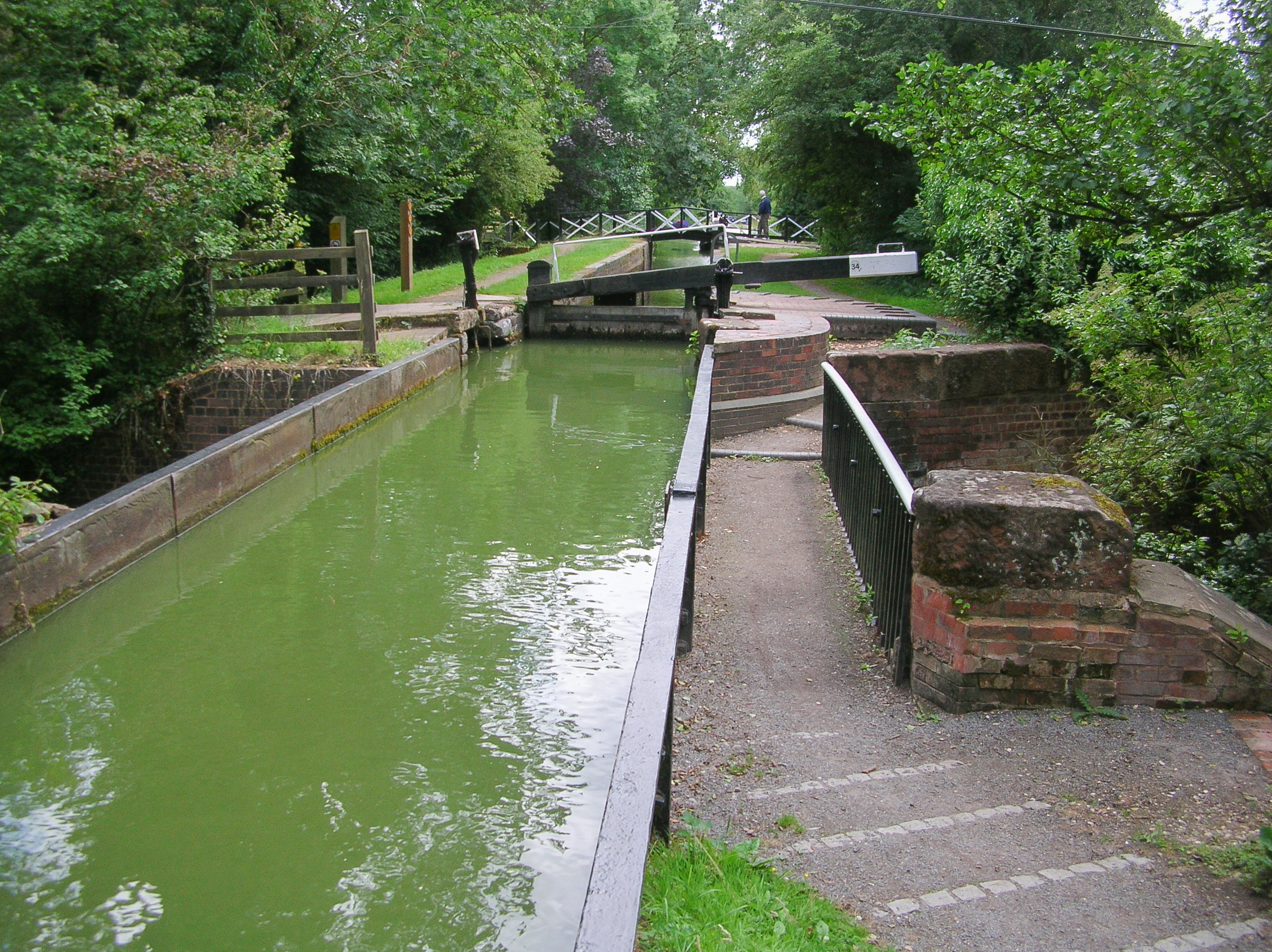
- Yarningale Aqueduct, looking south towards lock 34
- Coordinates: 52.2952°N 1.7316°W
- Locale: Rowington/Claverdon, Warwickshire, England
- Maintained by: Canal & River Trust

Characteristics
- Total length: 42 feet (13 m)
- Width: 9 feet (2.7 m)

History
- Construction start: 1812 (original); 1834 (current)
- Opened: 1834 (current)

Statistics

Listed Building – Grade II*
- Official name: Yarningdale Aqueduct
- Designated: 4 January 1990
- Reference no.: 1382094

Location
- Interactive map of Yarningale Aqueduct

Yarningale Aqueduct is one of three aqueducts on a 4 miles (6 km) length of the Stratford-upon-Avon Canal in Warwickshire. It spans the Kingswood Brook near the village of Claverdon. All three aqueducts are unusual in that the towpaths are at the level of the canal bottom.

Originally built between 1812 and 1816 as a wooden structure, the aqueduct is a single-berth navigation over a local stream, and is approximately 42 feet (13 m) long. It leads into the 34th lock – "Bucket Lock" – on the canal, the middle of a three-lock flight in the Claverdon area.

In 1834, the aqueduct was destroyed by flooding of the two waterways, caused by a surge from the nearby Grand Union Canal. It was rebuilt in cast iron the same year by Horseley Ironworks.

== Images ==
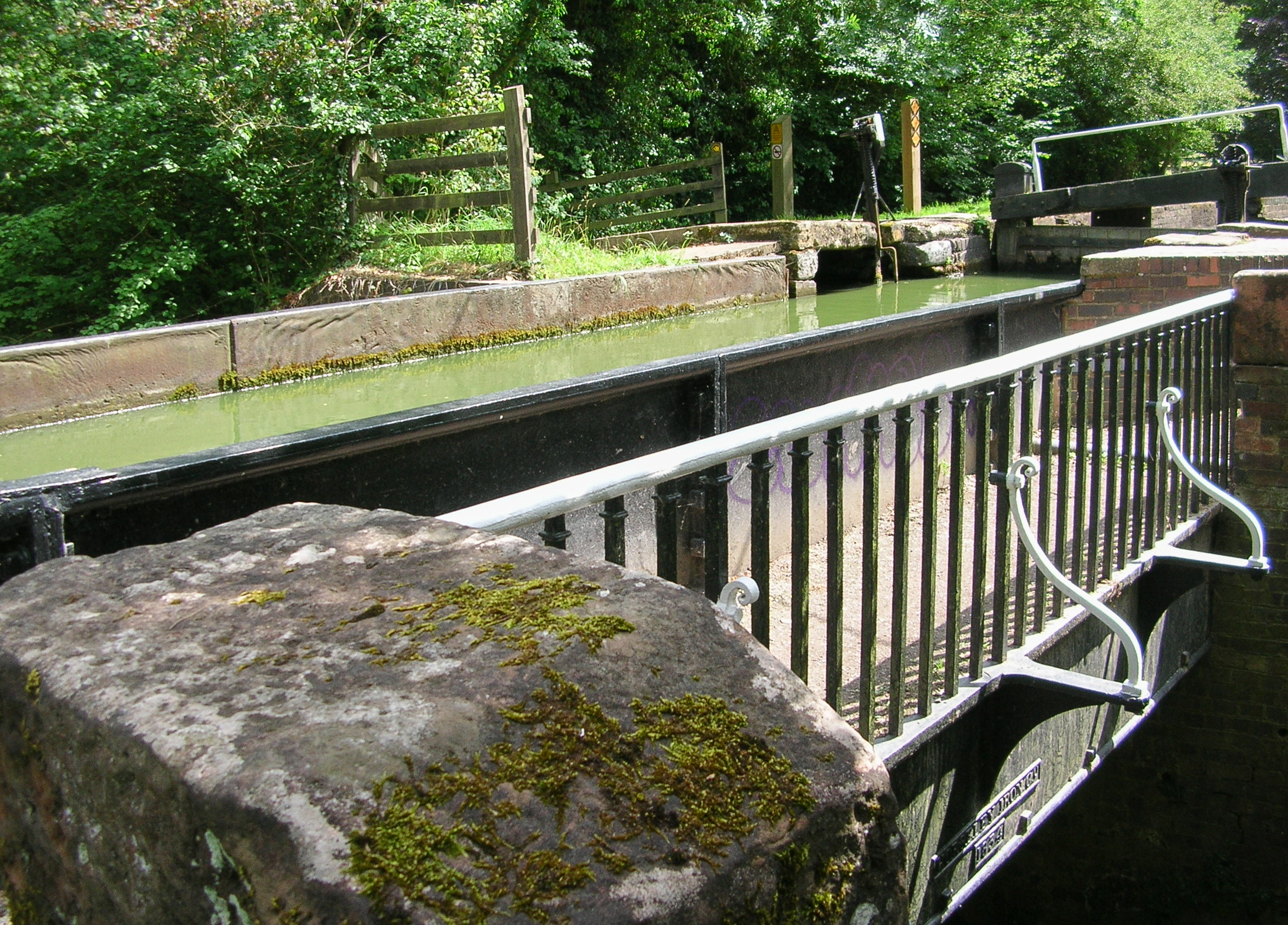
