= Arnold Alcock =

English rugby union player

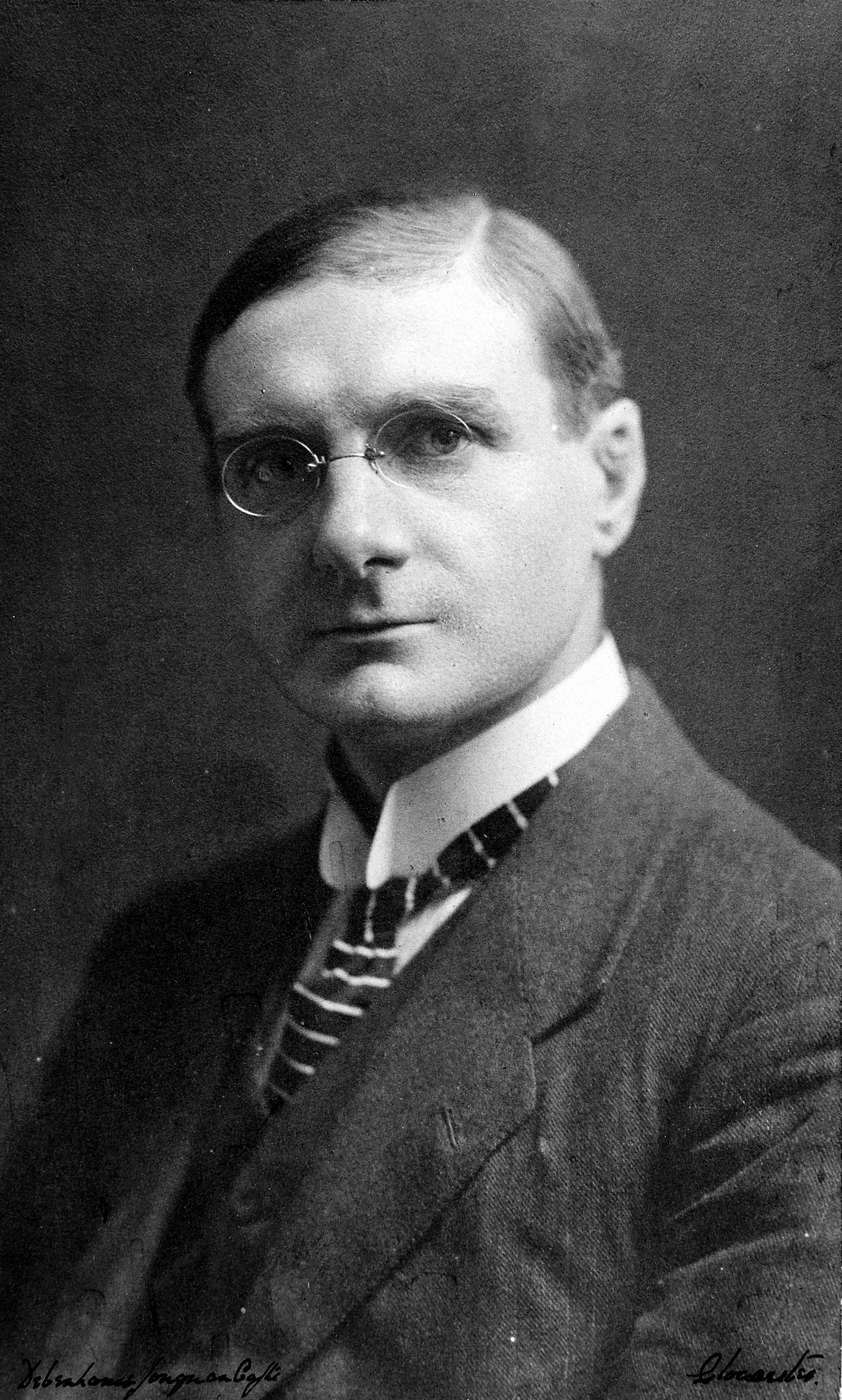
- Born: 18 August 1882 Wolstanton, Staffordshire, England
- Died: 7 November 1973 (aged 91) Gloucester, Gloucestershire, England

Rugby union career
- Position: Hooker
International career
Years	Team	Apps	(Points)
1906	England	1	(0)

Arnold Alcock (18 August 1882 – 7 November 1973) was an English international rugby union player.

== Biography ==
Known as "Doc", Alcock was born in Wolstanton, Staffordshire, and played rugby for Guy's Hospital RFC during his medical studies. His England debut, as a forward against the touring Springboks in 1906, came through fortuitous circumstances. Due to a clerical error, England's original choice Lancelot Slocock had failed to receive an invitation, with Alcock selected instead. An underwhelming performance ensured this would be Alcock's only cap.

Alcock was senior surgeon at the Gloucestershire Royal Hospital and on his retirement in 1953 became High sheriff of Gloucester. He served 45 years as president of Gloucester RFC between 1924 and 1969.

== See also ==
- List of England national rugby union players
