= Wootton Wawen Aqueduct =

Aqueduct in Warwickshire, England

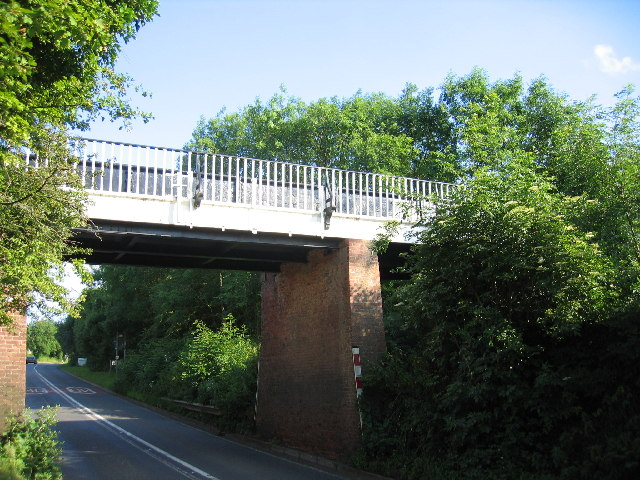
- Interactive map of Wootton Wawen Aqueduct
- Location: Wootton Wawen, Warwickshire, England
- Coordinates: 52.26475°N 1.76909°W

Listed Building – Grade II*
- Official name: Wootton Wawen Aqueduct
- Designated: 4 January 1990
- Reference no.: 1382221

Scheduled monument
- Official name: Aqueduct
- Reference no.: 1005740

Wootton Wawen Aqueduct is one of three aqueducts on a 6 km length of the Stratford-upon-Avon Canal in Warwickshire. All are unusual in that the towpaths are at the level of the canal bottom.

This aqueduct is just outside Wootton Wawen, where the canal crosses the A3400 main road. It was built by the Stratford Canal Company in 1813 and is a Grade II* listed structure.

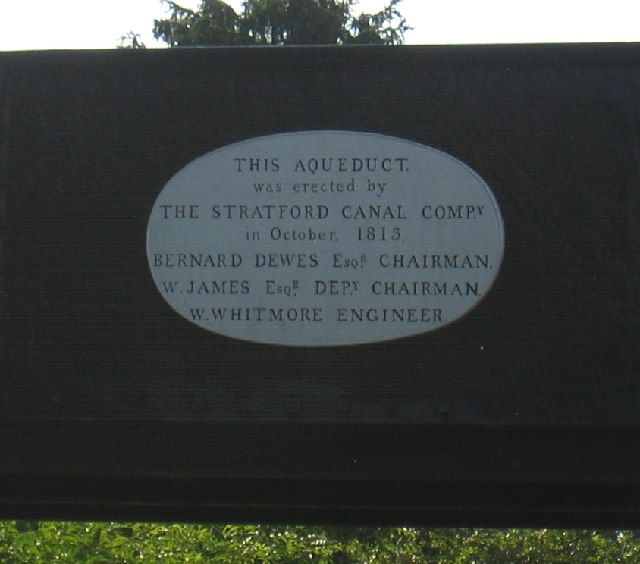
Plaque attached to non-towpath (south) side of trough
