= Lancelot Slocock =

England international rugby union player

Andrew Slocock
- Born: Lancelot Andrew Noel Slocock; 25 December 1886 Wootton Wawen, near Stratford-on-Avon, England
- Died: 9 August 1916 (aged 29) Guillemont, France
- School: Marlborough College

Rugby union career
- Position: Forward
Senior career
Years	Team	Apps	(Points)
- Liverpool FC
–	Lancashire		
International career
Years	Team	Apps	(Points)
1907-1908	England	8	(9)

Lancelot Andrew Noel Slocock (25 December 1886 – 9 August 1916) was a rugby union international who represented England from 1907 to 1908. He also captained his country.

== Early life ==
Lancelot Andrew Noel Slocock was born on Christmas Day 1886 in Wootton Wawen, Warwickshire, the third son of the Reverend F H Slocock and his wife Judith. He was educated at Marlborough College and at school made a name as an all-round athlete playing in the rugby fifteen as well as the cricket and hockey elevens.

== Rugby union career ==
Slocock joined one of the oldest Rugby clubs in England, Liverpool FC and made a name for himself as a lineout jumper. He was selected for the North in the North v South match, and this being one of the main England trials at the time, was selected to play for England against the touring South Africans in December 1906. However, due to a clerical error Slocock was omitted from the side and his position was taken instead by Arnold Alcock, a medical student at Guy's Hospital. Slocock did face South Africa in their next match, against Lancashire, a county for whom Slocock would eventually win fourteen caps. Slocock scored a try in this match, although the tourists won. Slocock made his international debut on 5 January 1907 at the Athletic Ground, Richmond in the England vs France match. Slocock again crossed the line to score in a match England won by forty-one points to thirteen. He was selected for the rest of England 's 1907 international season and was one of the only outstanding England players in the Wales match at Swansea on 12 January where England lost 22-nil. The Times recorded "the English forwards had periods of relative success, and the efforts of some of them, notably L.A.N. Slocock…. deserved a better fate." Slocock again scored in the next match in Dublin, but was on the losing side with Ireland winning 17–9. England 's final match of the season was held at Blackheath against Scotland, which the visitors won by three points to eight, claiming the championship and retaining the Calcutta Cup.

Slocock played in all matches in the 1908 season, beginning with a win on 1 January over France at Colombes. England's next match was at Ashton Gate in Bristol to meet with Wales and Slocock was part of the pack regarded as the strongest pack England had fielded for some time. The loss to Wales was 18 points to 28, and Wales would go on to win the grand slam that year. Ireland then defeated England at Richmond. The final match of the international season was against Scotland at Inverleith on 21 March and this proved to be Slocock's last game for England. As well as playing for England he had been secretary of the Liverpool club for the 1907–8 seasons. Slocock captained the side and scored a try, though this was not enough to wrest the Calcutta Cup from the Scots.

== Life outside sport ==
Slocock had a seemingly premature international retirement, but this was due to his career in the cotton trade, requiring frequent trips abroad, most commonly to the United States. As amateurs, business took priority over sport. He married in 1912 Lena (Elinor) Cook, and they had one son, Anthony, born in 1914. The family moved to Savannah, Georgia, United States. However, Lancelot returned to England to fight in the First World War. He was commissioned as a Second Lieutenant in the 1/10th Battalion of the King's Regiment (Liverpool), a Territorial Battalion, more commonly known as Liverpool Scottish. He arrived in France in January 1916, joining his battalion, the 1/10th, as part of the 55th division. He was then to take part in the Somme offensive, and was involved in the push to capture the village of Guillemont. The first attacks in this area on 8 August had failed and were followed by further attacks on the 9th, two of them made by the 1/10th Battalion of the King's Regiment. Second Lieutenant Lancelot Slocock whilst leading his men in one of these attacks was killed in action. Another former international, Lance Corporal John Abbott King, also serving with the 1/10th Battalion, died in the offensive. They were two of the eighty two thousand casualties incurred in this part of the campaign, resulting in a total advance of one thousand yards.
