= Caroline Slocock =

British civil servant and author

Caroline Slocock (born 30 December 1956) is a British former civil servant and author.

== Career ==
Slocock served as a private secretary in 10 Downing Street between 1989 and 1991. She joined the Downing Street staff during the premiership of Margaret Thatcher and was the only other woman to be present in the room when Thatcher resigned in November 1990. Slocock continued to work at Downing Street until 1991, working for Thatcher's successor, John Major. She has written about her time working for Margaret Thatcher and the events that led to the Prime Minister's resignation in "People Like Us: Margaret Thatcher and me".

After leaving No 10, she worked for 9 years at the Treasury, where, amongst other things, she advised the Chancellor on public sector priorities and reformed the public expenditure system and also worked to improve the culture and working practices of the Treasury. At the Department for Education and Skills, she then oversaw a major national expansion of childcare and nursery education. She was Chief Executive of the Equal Opportunities Commission between 2002 and 2007, a statutory body which promoted equal opportunities between men and women. She is currently the founder and Director of the think tank, Civil Exchange, and a founding member of a cross-sectoral leadership network, A Better Way. She is a regular commentator in the media and the author of many publications about government and civil society and about the need for greater investment in early action and social infrastructure.

Her second book, "Bad Government (And How to Make It Better)", published in 2026, is described as "part memoir, part manifesto", and "offers an insider's view of how the system evolved, why it is breaking and how it can be fixed".

== Personal life ==
She lives in Suffolk and London and is married to the crime writer John Nightingale. They have two daughters.
