= Wootton Wawen =

Village and civil parish in Warwickshire, England

Coordinates: 52.267°N 1.779°W

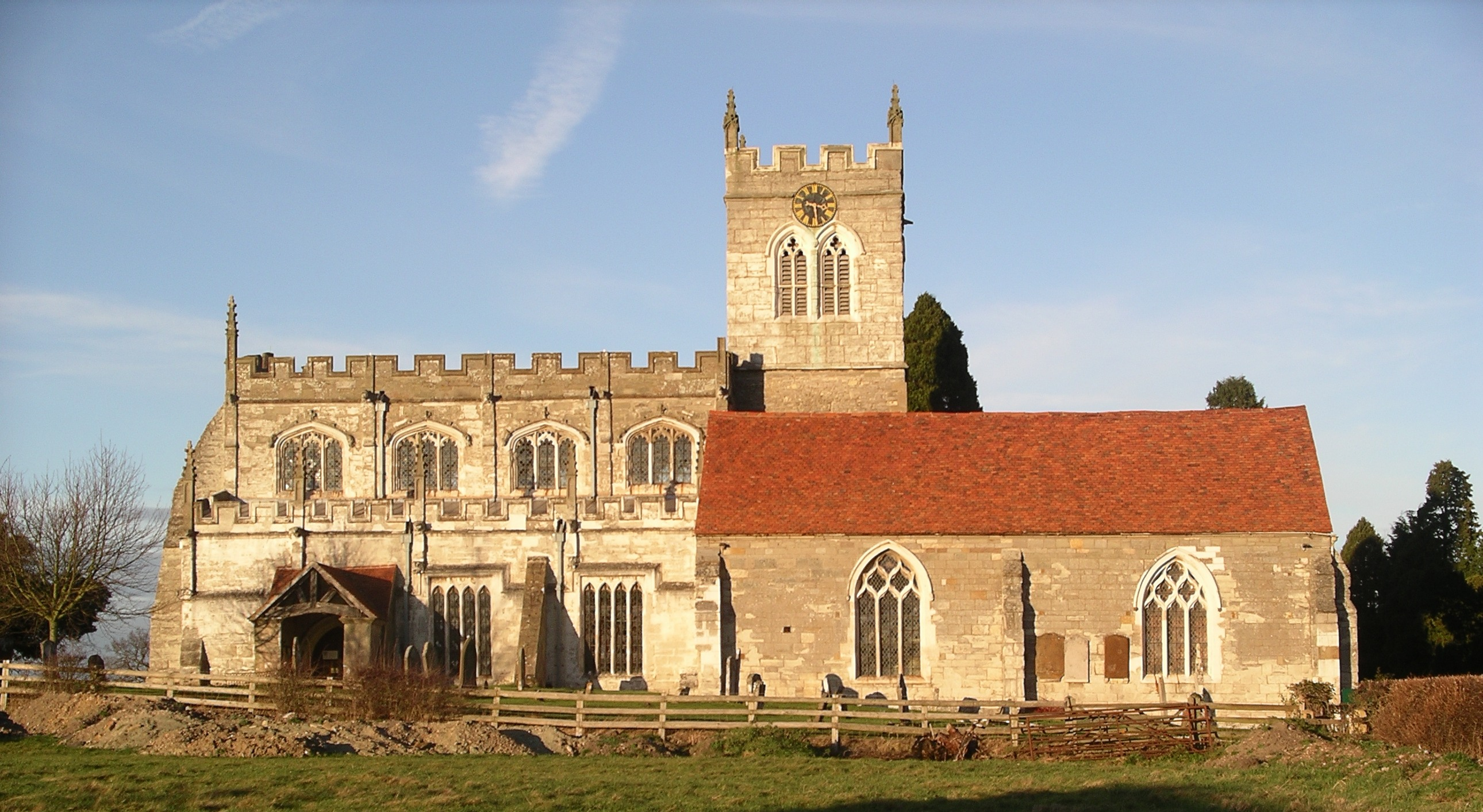
- St Peter's parish church, viewed from the south

- Location within Warwickshire
- Population: 1,318 (2011 census)
- OS grid reference: SP153630
  - London: 108 miles (174 km) SE
- Civil parish: Wootton Wawen
- District: Stratford-on-Avon
- Shire county: Warwickshire
- Region: West Midlands
- Country: England
- Sovereign state: United Kingdom
- Post town: HENLEY-IN-ARDEN
- Postcode district: B95
- Dialling code: 01564
- Police: Warwickshire
- Fire: Warwickshire
- Ambulance: West Midlands
- UK Parliament: Stratford-on-Avon
- Website: Parish Council Website for Wootton Wawen

Wootton Wawen /ˈwʊtən ˈwoʊ.ən/ is a village and civil parish in the Stratford-on-Avon district of Warwickshire, England. Located on the A3400 in west-central Warwickshire, it lies approximately 20 miles (32 km) from Birmingham, 2 miles (3 km) south of Henley-in-Arden and 6.5 miles (10 km) north of Stratford-upon-Avon. The surrounding soil consists of heavy clay and limited arable farming, and the land is predominantly used for pasture. Although formal inclosure of the common fields occurred in 1776, some local inclosures date roughly back to 1623.

The scenery is wooded and undulating, rising from about 200 feet (61 m), in the south to 488 feet (149 m), in the north-west at College Farm, above Forde Hall. Near here is Mockley Wood, which, with May's Wood in the centre of the parish and Austy Wood near Edstone, is one of the larger blocks of woodland. The older part of the village straddling the A3400 is designated as a Conservation Area because of its open, rural character and many historic buildings.

== History ==
The toponym "Wootton Wawen" means "farm near a wood, belonging to Wagen". Wagen or Waga is an Old Norse name.

The oldest surviving record of Wootton is from when Æthelbald, King of the Mercians, gave to the Earl Aethilric 20 hides of land for a minster between the years 723 and 737. The first wooden church was built at Wootton as a direct result of this charter of land, (about 2,000 acres (810 hectares)) on which to build a monastery or minster of Saint Mary. The first church may have been burnt and pillaged by Viking invaders, but between about 970 and 1040, Wagen, an Anglo-Danish landowner, established the present church. This land was in the district of the Stoppingas near the river Aeluuinnae, now called the Alne.

Domesday Book (1086) records, "in Pathlow Hundred in Wotton (Wawen) 7 hides. Land for 9 ploughs. 23 villagers with a priest and 22 smallholders who have 6 ploughs. 2 mills at 11s and 8 sticks of eels; woodland 2 leagues long and one league wide. Value £4. Waga held it freely." Waga was one of the witnesses to Earl Leofric's foundation of the monastery at Coventry in the first year of the reign of Edward the Confessor (1042–43). His lands extended beyond those at Wootton Wawen, but, after the Norman Conquest of England, Wootton was bestowed by William the Conqueror on Robert de Stafford, descended from the de Tonei family and who had fought stoutly with Duke William against King Harold. He made Stafford Castle his principal seat and took his surname thence.

Charles II passed through Wootton on his travels while escaping from England after the Battle of Worcester. Here, the king, disguised as the man-servant of the daughter of one of his supporters, Jane Lane, met with a party of Parliamentarian troopers:

before we came to Stradford upon Avon we espied upon the way a Troop of Horse whose riders were alighted, and the Horses eateing some grass by the wayside, staying there (as I thought) while their Muster-Maister was provideing their Quarters; Mrs Lanes Sisters Husband (who went along as far as Stradford) seeing this Troop of Horse just in our way, sayd that for his part he would not goe by them, for he had once or twice been beaten by some of the Parliament Soldiers, and he would not run the venture again. I heareing him say soe begged Mrs Lane softly in her Eare that we might not turne back but goe on, for that Enemy would certainly send after us to enquire who we were if they should see us turne. But all she could say in the world would not doe, but her Brother in law turned quite round and went to Stradford another way the troop of Horse being there just getting on Horse-back about twice 12 score off, and I told her we did meete the Troop just but in the Towne of Stradford.

The Cinema Museum in London holds Archive film of Wootton Wawen from the summer of 1952.

== Economy ==
Wootton Wawen has always been primarily a farming settlement, but over the centuries industrial activity has included milling; two mills are mentioned in Domesday Book. Early in the 19th century there was a mill used for papermaking, as it probably was a century earlier – a reference to William Martin, "paperman" of Wootton, occurring in 1717 – but there has also been a fulling mill for the production of hemp and flax on Wootton Green, and a dyehouse at nearby Blue Hole. There was also a hurdle-making industry in the village for a time. Today the area is largely agricultural with many residents commuting to nearby cities for employment.

== Governance ==
Wootton Wawen is a ward within Stratford on Avon District Council and represented by Councillor Ian Shenton of the Conservative Party who is also the County Councillor for the Arden Division of the County Council which includes Wolverton, Langley, Preston Bagot, Henley, Wootton Wawen, Ullenhall, Tanworth in Arden and Earlswood Parishes. Nationally it is part of Stratford-on-Avon constituency, whose Member of Parliament has been Manuela Perteghella of the Liberal Democrats since the 2024 general election. It was included in the West Midlands electoral region of the European Parliament.

== Parish church ==
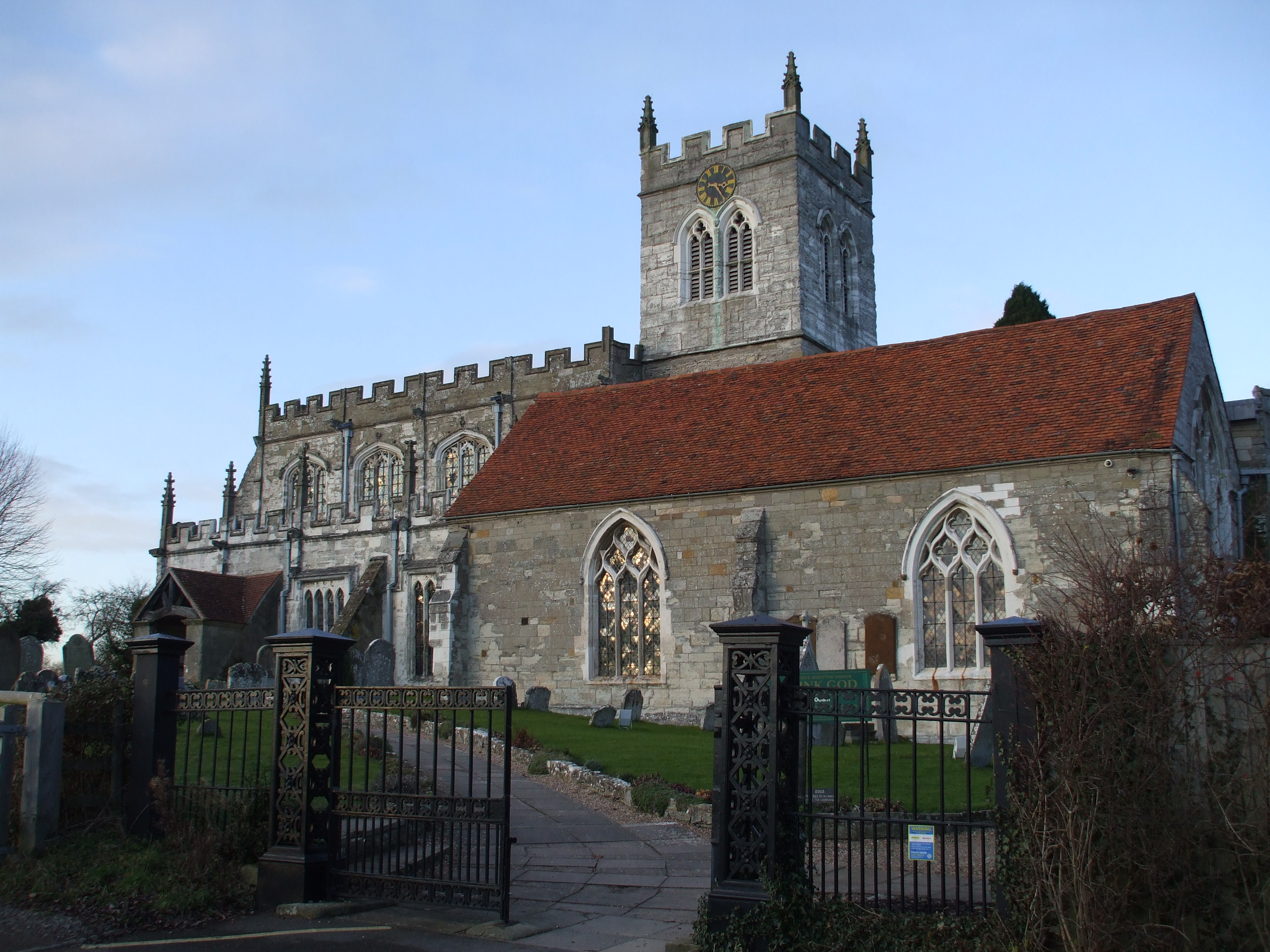
St Peter's church from the south-east

The Church of England parish church of Saint Peter is notable for having the most pronounced Anglo-Saxon work in the county. It is the oldest church in Warwickshire, although much of the present fabric is later. It comprises a chancel with a south chapel, nave, South aisle and on the North the tower embattled and pinnacled. There are also North and South porches the east jamb of the south porch has several votive crosses scored into it. The base of the tower and the first two stages are Saxon with four doorways, the top of the tower is 15th century as are the clerestory, the nave battlements, the north doorway and porch, the middle arch of the arcade, the west window with busts of a king and queen and the east window with a leaf frieze. The tower is the earliest part of the church, preserved in the middle despite restricting views of the chancel from the nave, which is the current site of the altar. The font is an octagonal bowl resting on eight sculptured heads similar to others in the county at Snitterfield and Lapworth. The old oak pulpit and choir screen is 15th century.

The church has a small chained library of 17th-century theological works and some notable monumental brasses, particularly the altar tomb of John Harewell and his wife Anna (1505).

=== Bells ===
The tower has a ring of six bells. The second bell was cast in 1591 by a member of the Watts family of bellfounders of Leicester. The tenor bell was cast in 1719 by Richard Sanders of Bromsgrove. The fourth bell was cast in 1784 by Charles and John Rudhall of Gloucester and the third bell was cast in 1803 by John Rudhall of Gloucester.

The treble bell was cast in 1742 by Henry Bagley of Chacombe and the fifth was cast in 1761 by Thomas Rudhall of Gloucester. For a long time the treble was cracked and bolted with iron and then from 1911 the fifth was bound with an iron band around the inscription. The latter repair was by Thomas Bond of Burford, Oxfordshire who at the same time re-hung all six bells. Then in 1955 the two damaged bells were recast by John Taylor & Co of Loughborough, who at the same time tuned the other bells and re-hung all six again.

All canons (metal loops at the top of the bells) have been removed and replaced with bolted iron joists for ringing. The 16th-century oak frame with pits for three bells still exists: the posts have moulded corbelling at the tops and are strengthened by curved struts. It has been altered to take four bells, the treble and second being hung to the north of it.

=== Clergy ===
The vicar at the time of the Puritan Survei of the Ministrie in Warwickshire of 1586 was described as mascall (John Mascall 1580–1642):

vicar a precher thogh he be growen Idle negligent & slouthfull. a man defamed & of tainted life he hath two charges beside Wooton videlicet, Henley & Ownall Ullenhall he supplieth by his hirelinges: whereof one vpon a rumor of change of religion in mounsiers daies did shave his beard [indicative of a reversion to Catholicism]. Value xl yearlie.

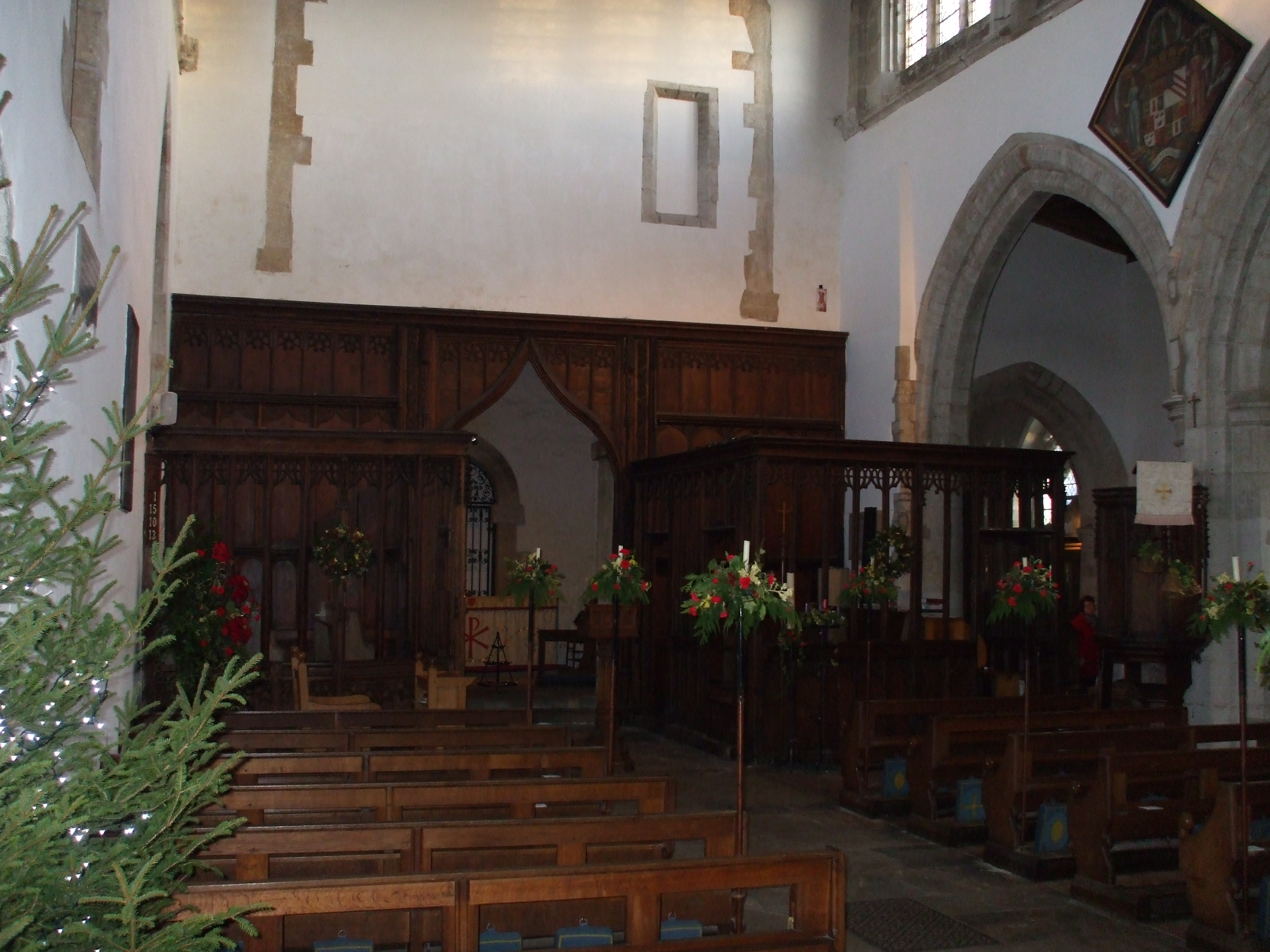
St Peter's nave

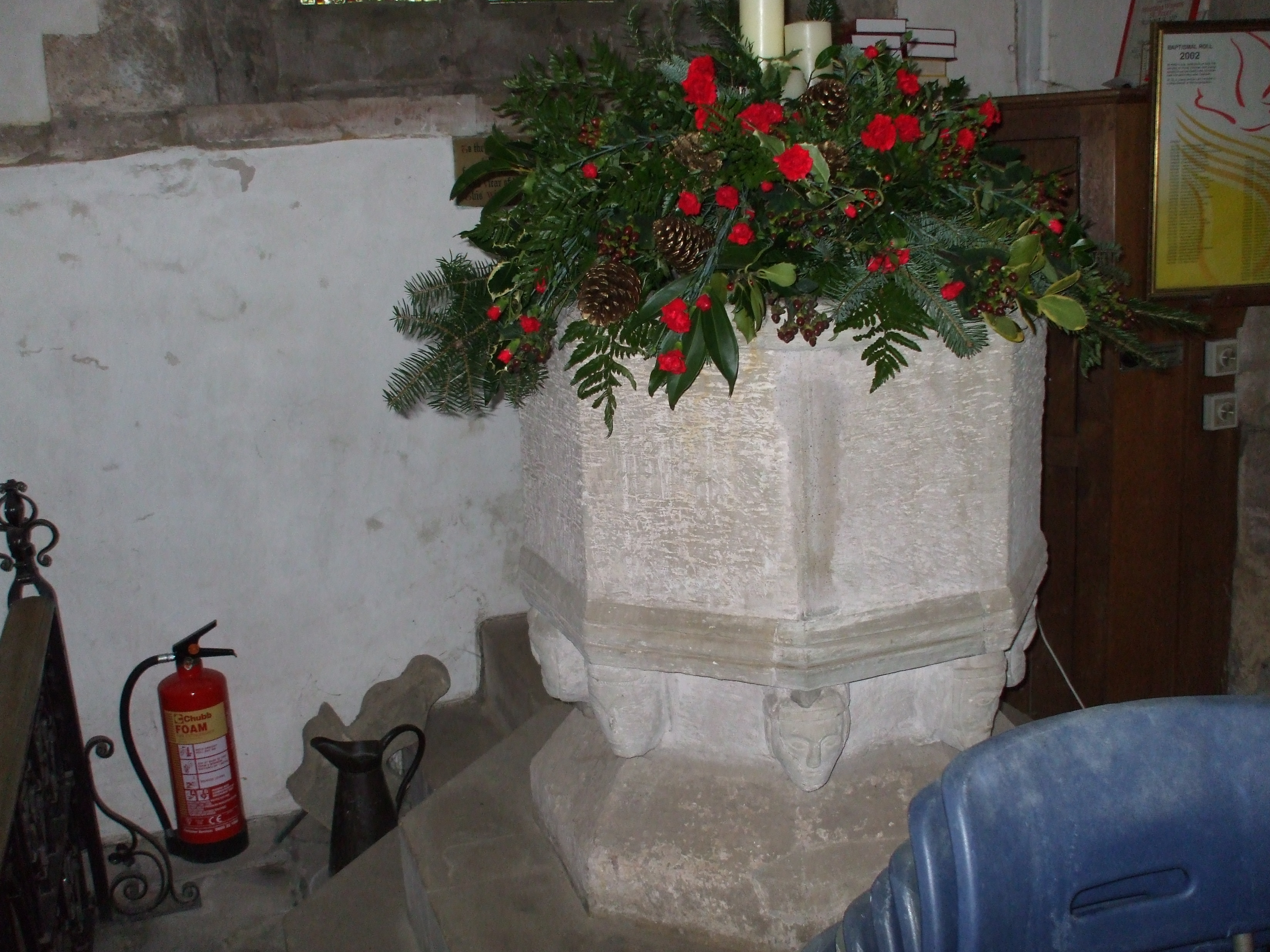
St Peter's font

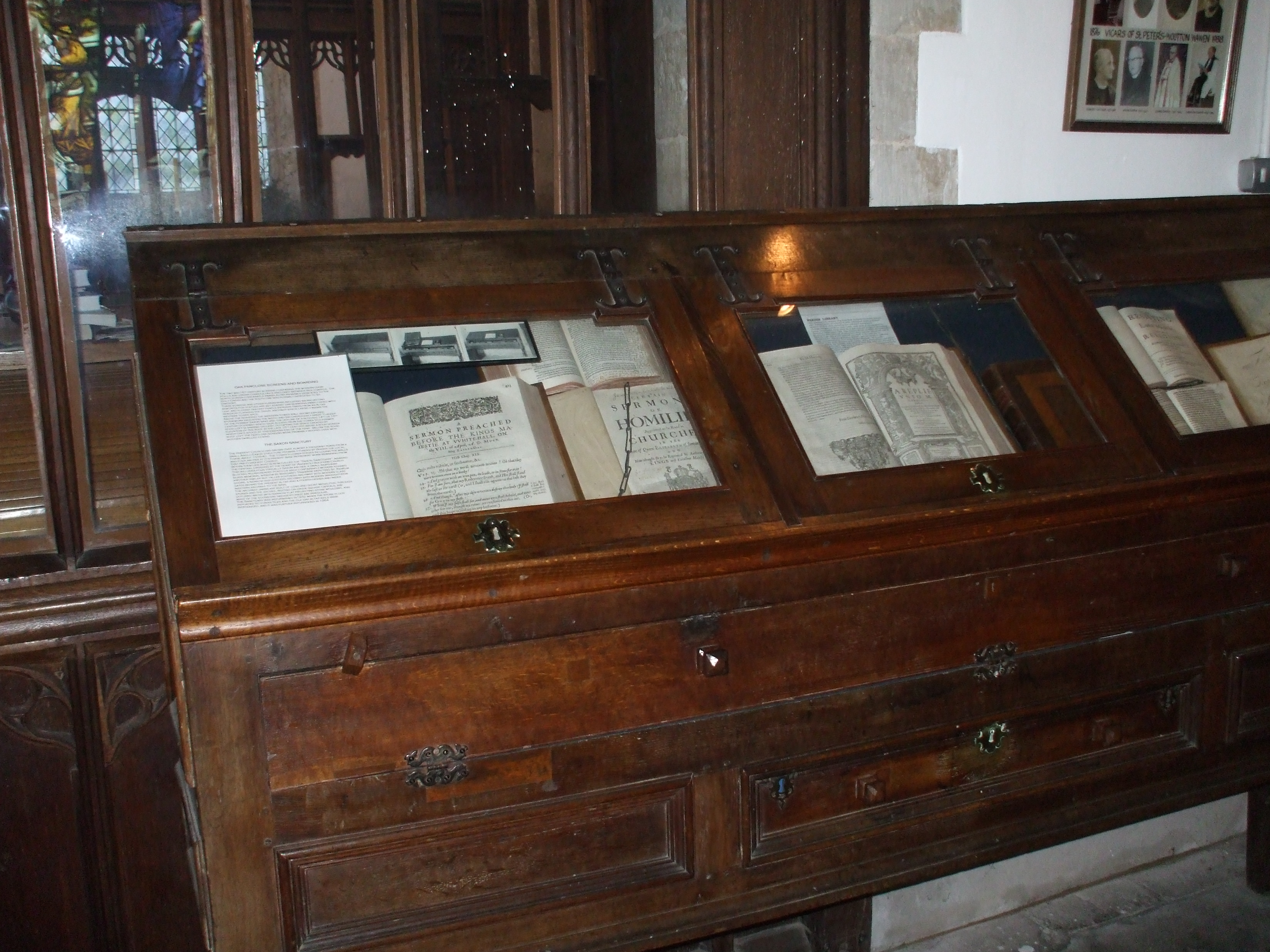
St Peter's Chained Library

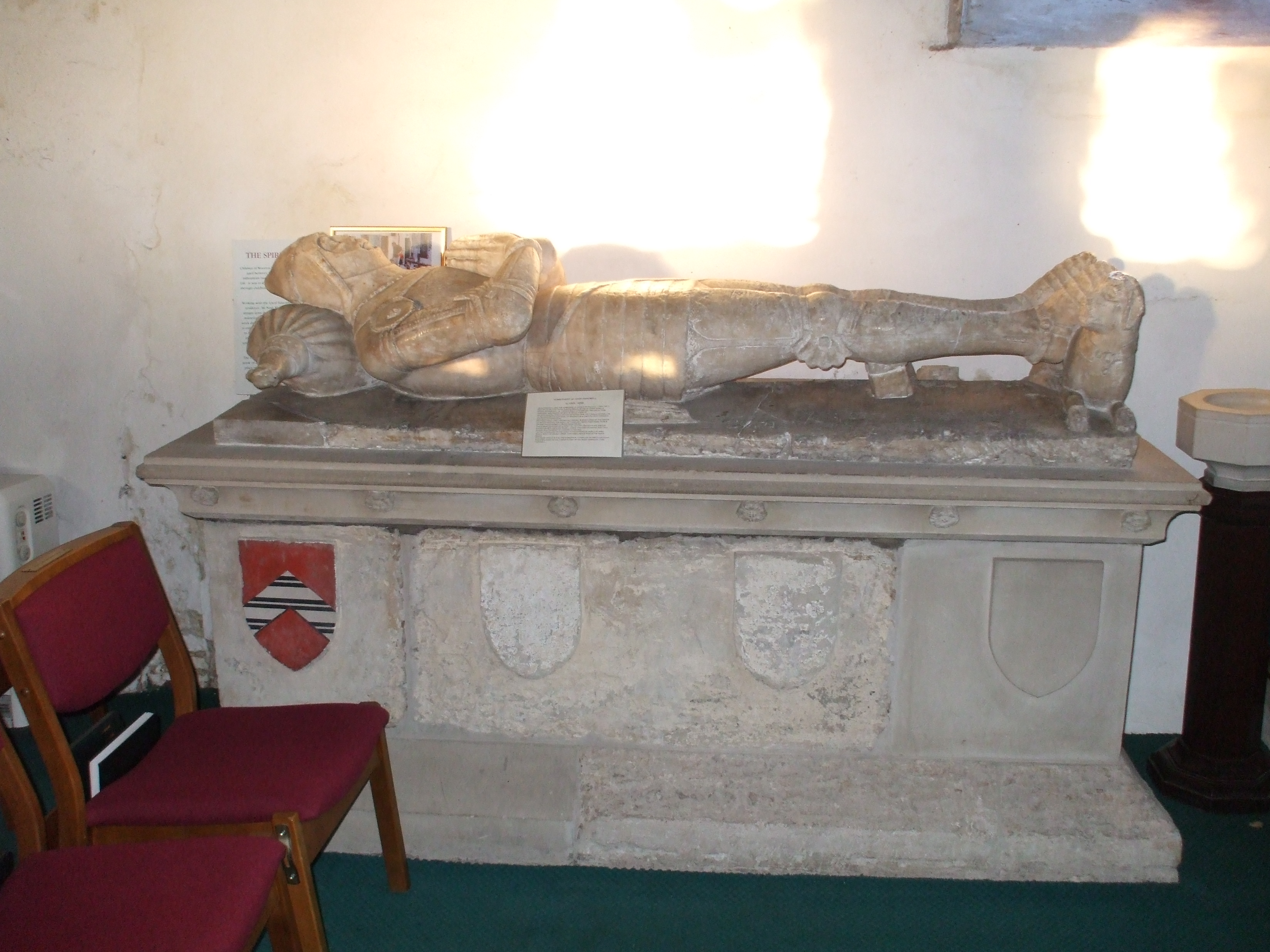
Chest tomb of John Harewell, 1365–1428

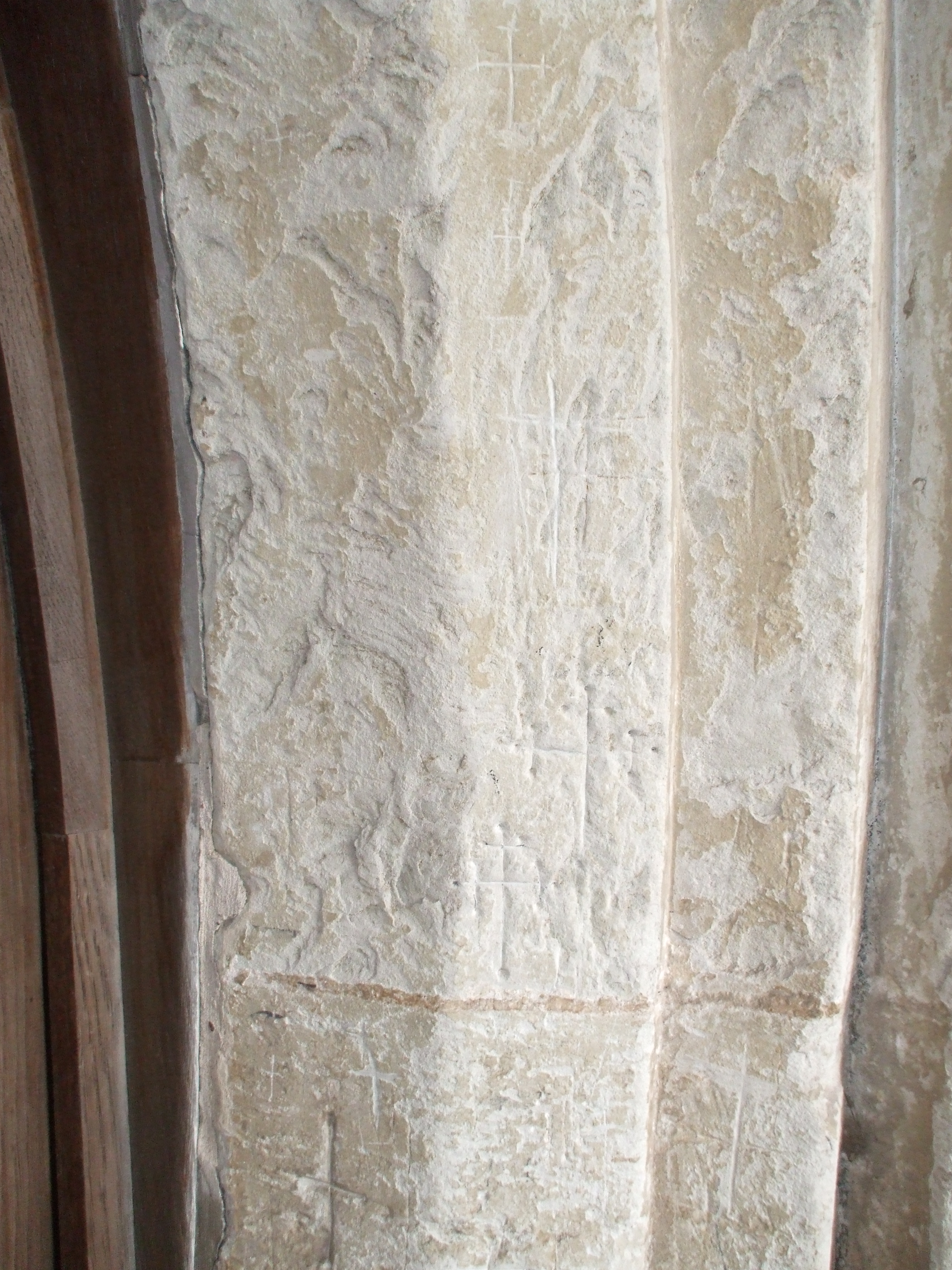
Votive crosses in the jamb of the south doorway

In the Black Death, bodies from Coventry were transported to the churchyard for burial in an area which has become known as the "Coventry Piece". This ground still cannot be disturbed.

== Priory ==
Not long after the Norman Conquest, Robert de Stafford gave the church of Wootton with a hide of land nearby and another hide at "Doversele" to the Benedictine Abbey of St Peter de Castellion of Conches in Normandy which had been established in 1035 by his father, Roger de Tonei. They established a small alien priory here: a prior and one monk constituted its community and the church was re-dedicated to St Peter ad Vincula. In 1398 Richard II gave the priory to the Carthusians at Coventry, but the grant was reversed soon after by Henry IV and the monks re-established. It was bestowed with all its possessions on 12 December 1443 upon the Provost and Scholars of King's College, Cambridge, and on 30 November 1447 the Abbey of Conches released all title to the Priory to the college, in whose hands the manor still remains. No trace of the priory buildings remains but they stood between the churchyard and the ancient fishpond that is near the Henley Road.

At the start of the reign of Edward I, Peter de Altaribus was prior. He became involved in a brawl which brought about the intervention of the bishop. The circumstances are related with considerable detail in the episcopal registers of Godfrey Giffard, Bishop of Worcester. An inquisition was held at Warwick on the Tuesday after Palm Sunday, 1281, to hear the dispute between Peter de Altaribus, and brother Roger his monk. William the vicar of Wootton, had been summoned to the priory to stop the brawl, and on arrival he met the prior coming out of the hall door whilst inside he found brother Roger sitting in a chair with his nose bleeding. The prior accused Roger of wounding himself in his nose with his own finger; whereas Roger claimed the prior had hit him on the nose, which was corroborated by others who added that Roger did not return the blow. The argument was over Peter's withdrawal of distributions to the poor, lack of hospitality, wasting the priory's goods, and drunkenness. Both were found guilty and excommunicated which after appeal they were absolved and recalled to the monastery of Conches, to receive punishment from their abbot. It is exceptional to find an alien priory subject to diocesan visitation, but this small priory was also visited by Bishop Giffard in 1269, 1284, and 1290.

== Historic secular buildings ==
Between the mill and the church is Wootton Hall, a large stone building in the Palladian style, mainly built in 1687 but incorporating parts of an earlier, probably Elizabethan, house. It was originally the home of the Carington family. Outbuildings behind the house are possibly the remains of the earlier manor-house. At the end of the Second World War the Hall was in a dilapidated condition and threatened with demolition but was bought in 1958 by Bill Allen, of Allen's Caravans, who developed the grounds into a mobile home park. This development rescued and restored the Hall and revitalised the community.

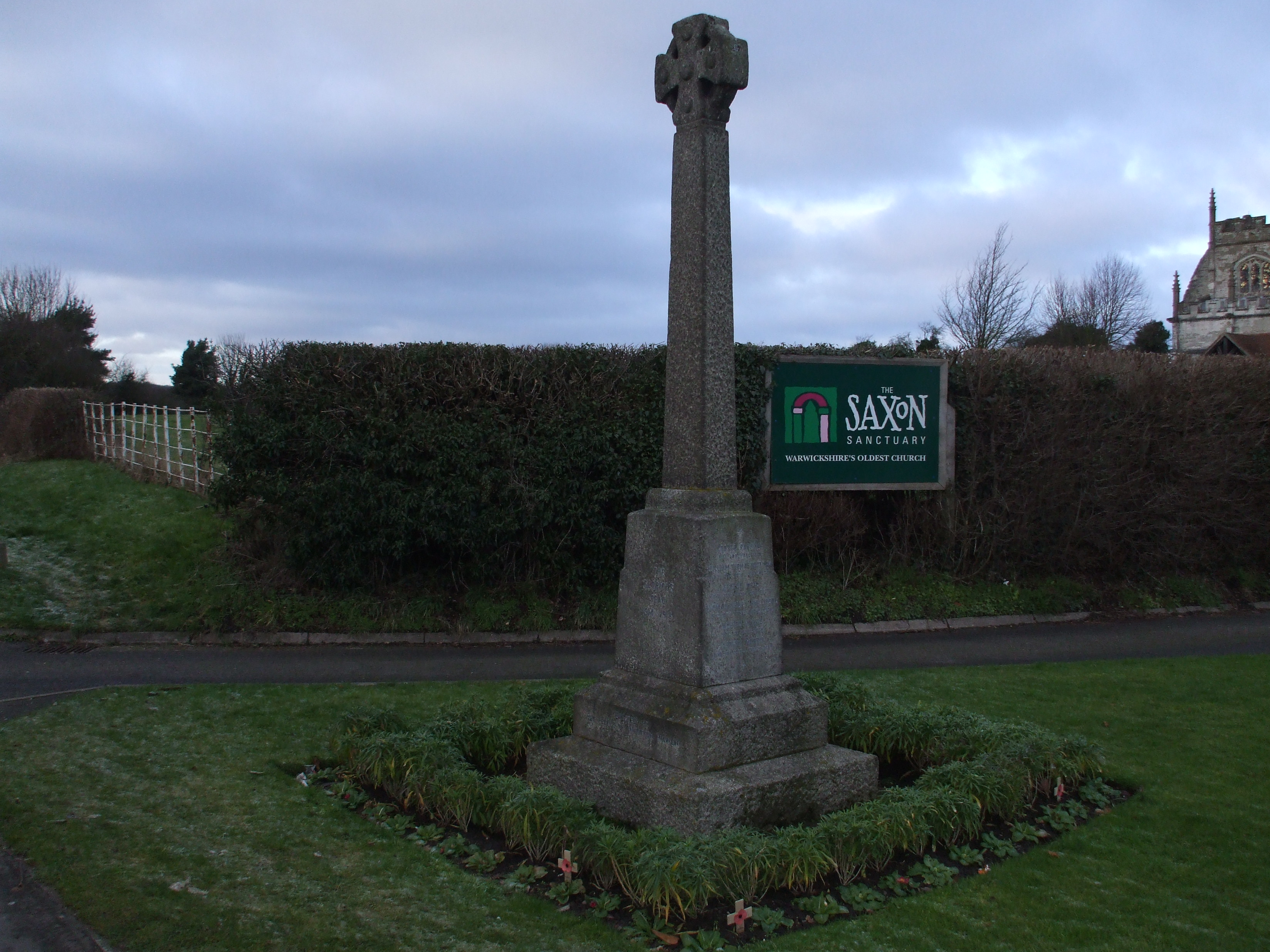
Wootton War Memorial

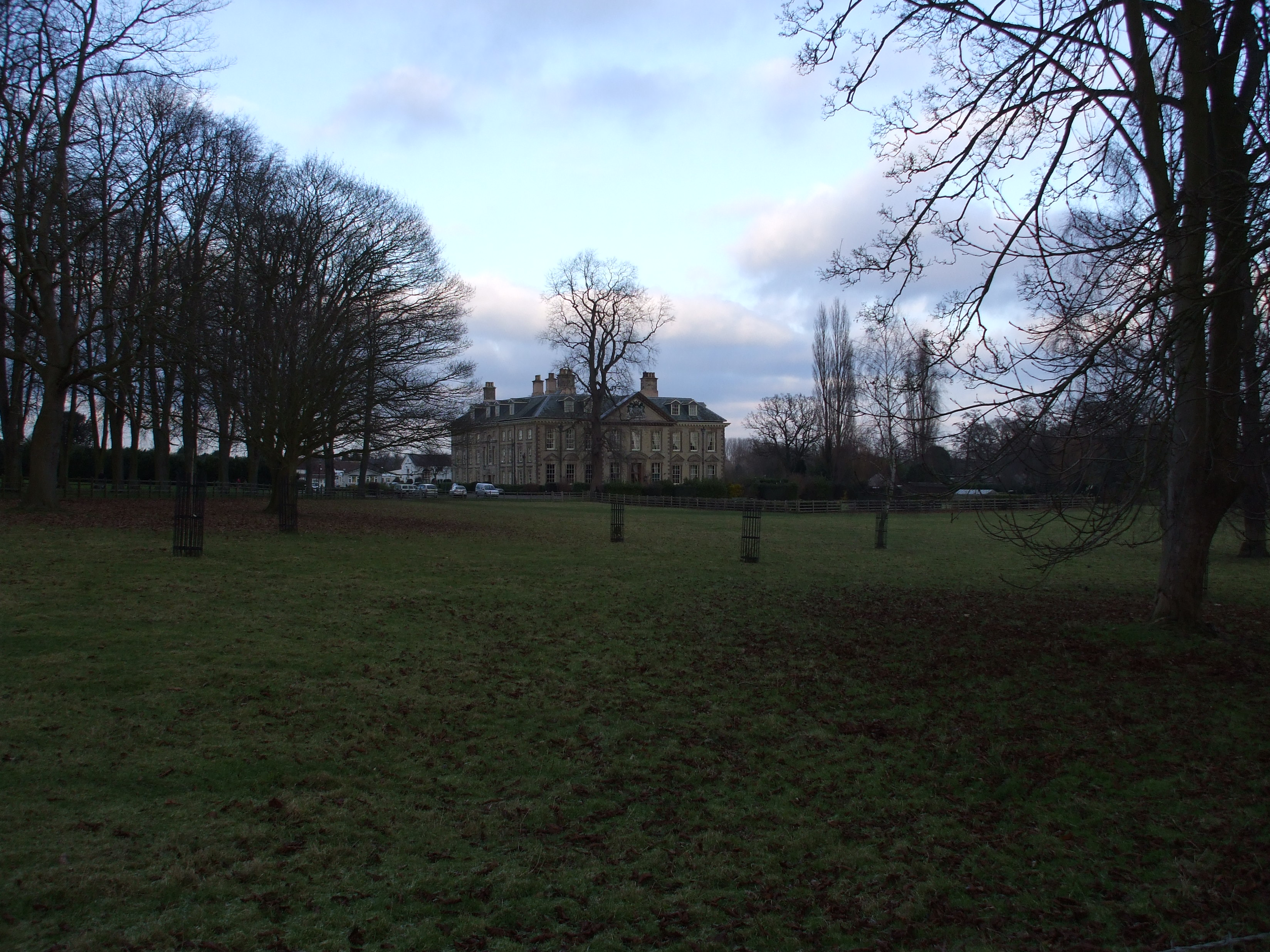
Wootton Hall and Park

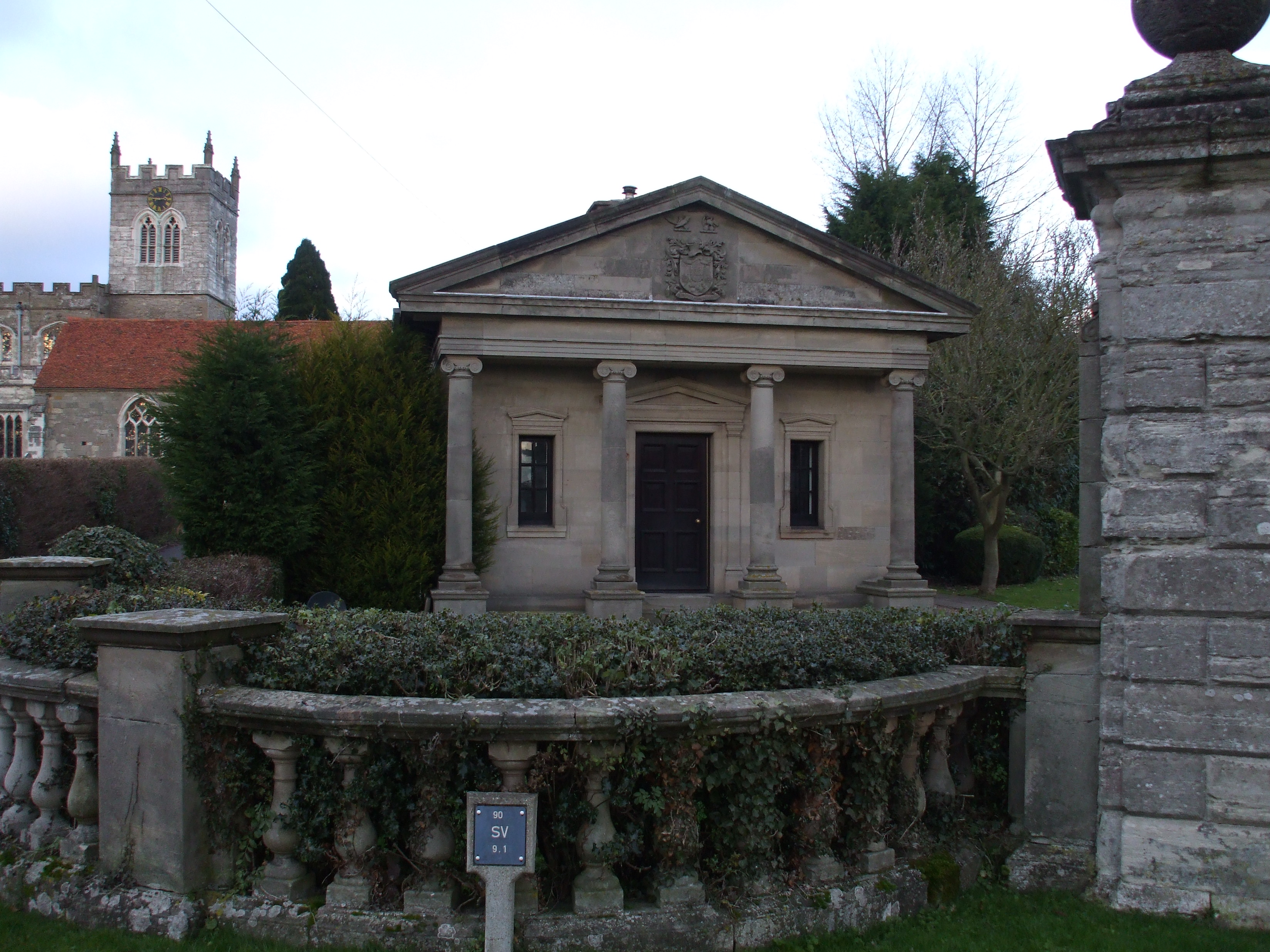
Wootton Hall Lodge Gate

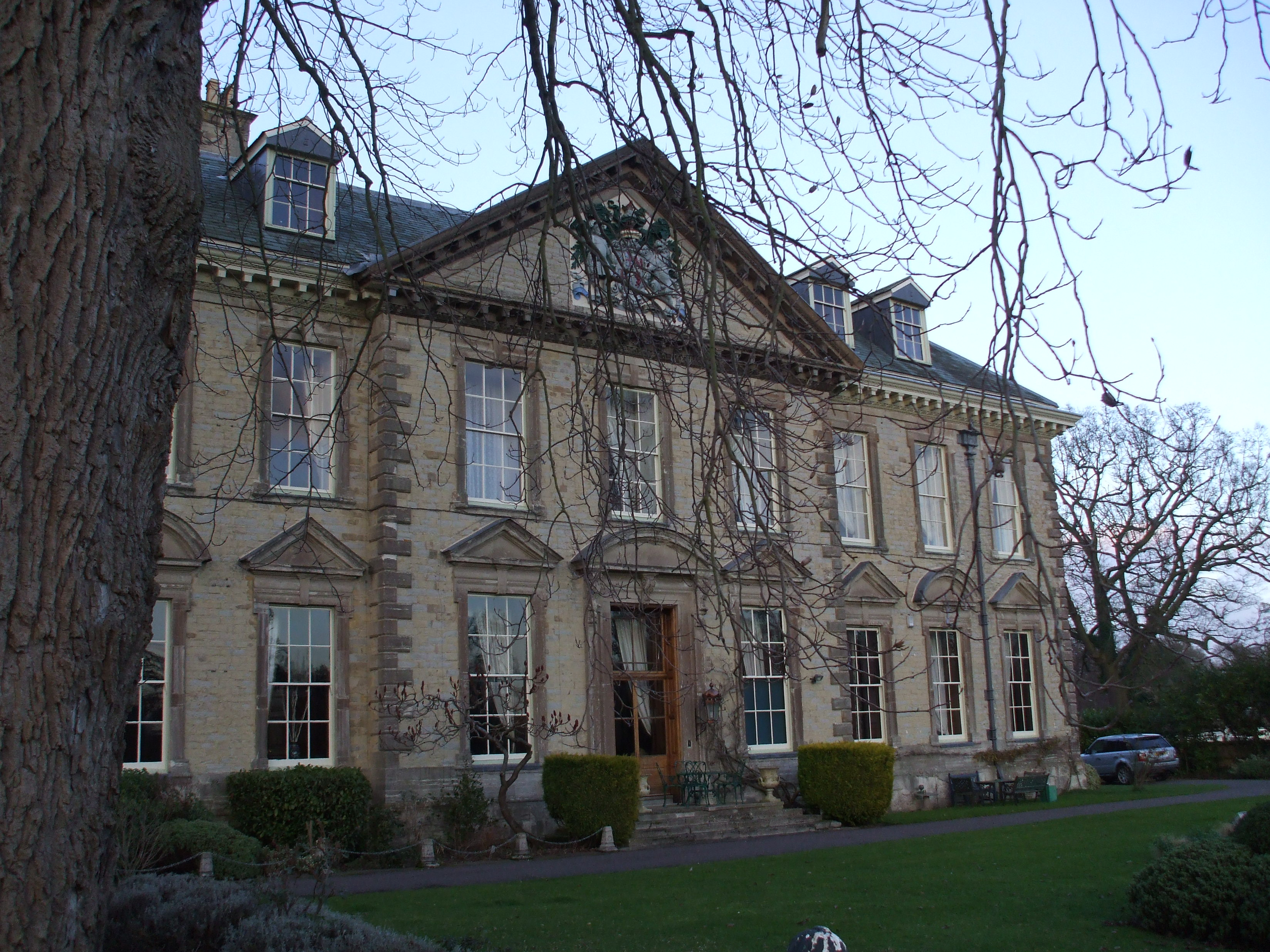
Wootton Hall

Other notable buildings include the Bull's Head Inn, situated at the south end of the street, being an L-shaped low building of timber-framing, probably of the 16th century. Inside are wide fireplaces, one with a lintel inscribed M 1697 TH, and open-timbered ceilings, however there is a stone giving the date of the building as 1317. Three of the buildings north of it on the same side, and The Cottage, facing the south end of the village street, have remains of 17th-century timber framing. In a short lane south of the church is the old Workhouse, now a dwelling-house; it is a small timber-framed building covered with rough-cast cement and has a gabled north end with a jettied upper storey.

The Manor Farm, at the north end of the village, is built of early-18th-century brick, but the chimneystack of diagonal shafts looks earlier. The west front, slightly recessed between gabled cross-wings, has a doorway with a semi-domical hood carved with palm leaves and a basket of fruit and flowers.

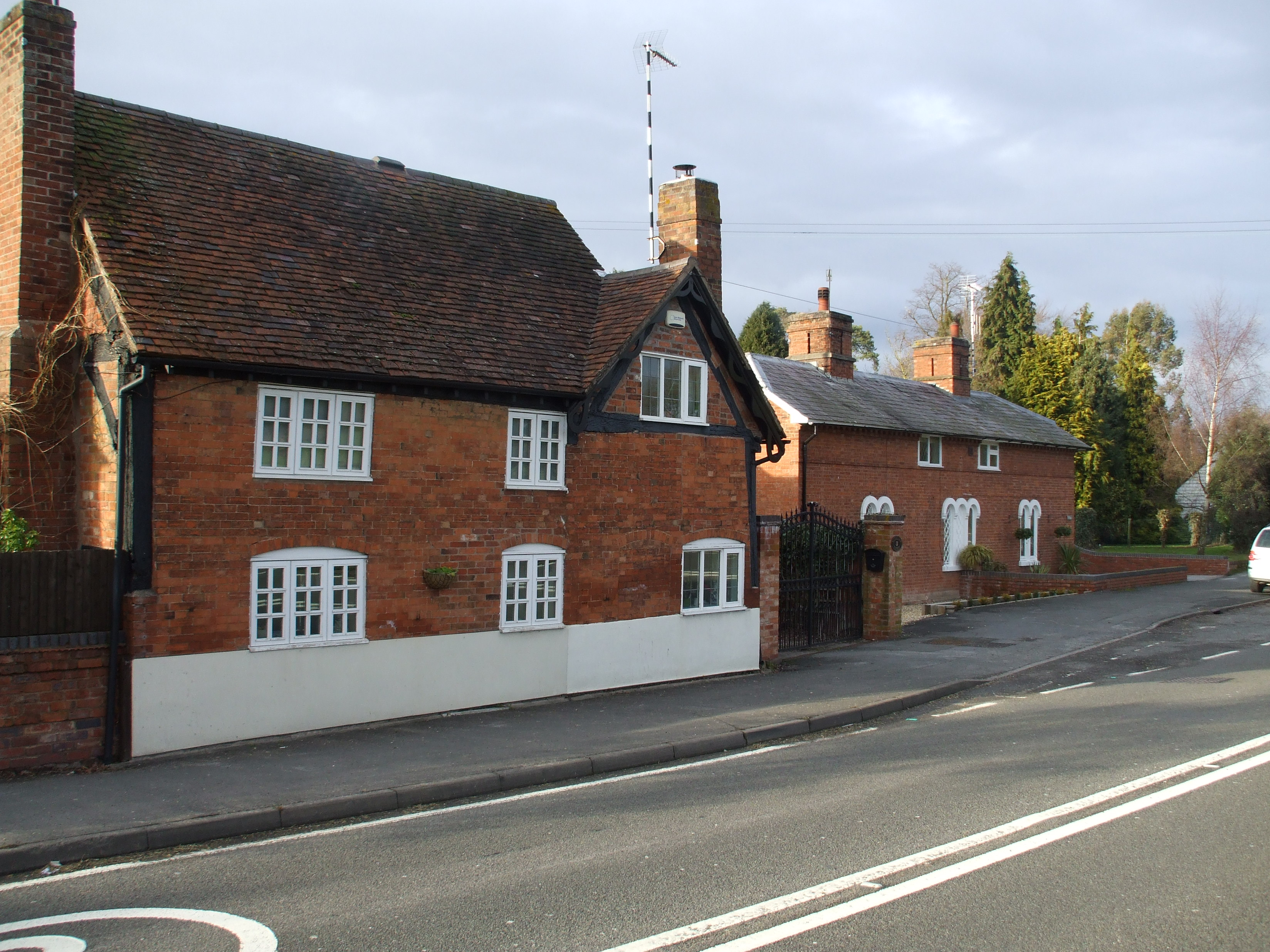
Cottages at Wootton Wawen

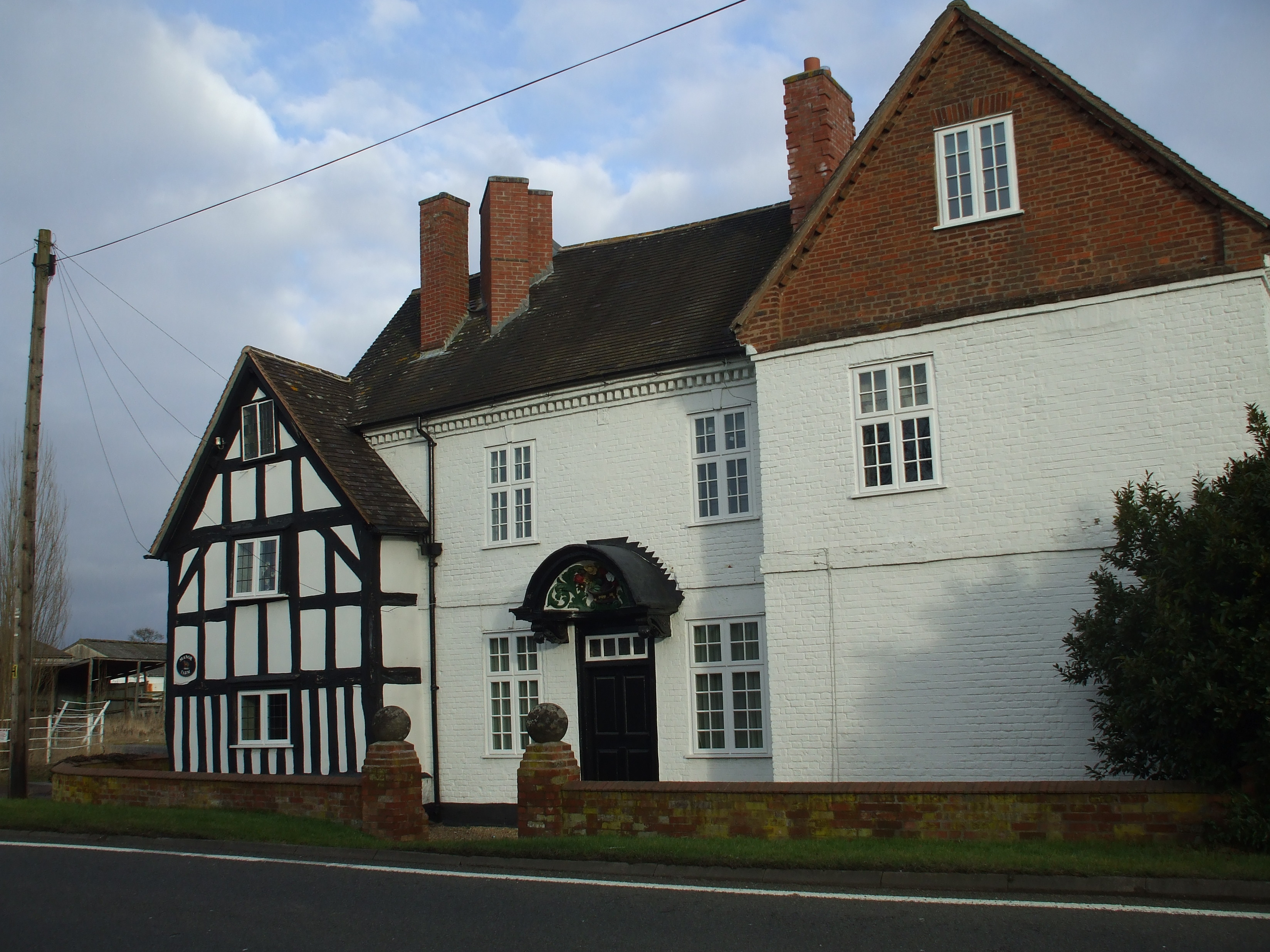
Manor Farm

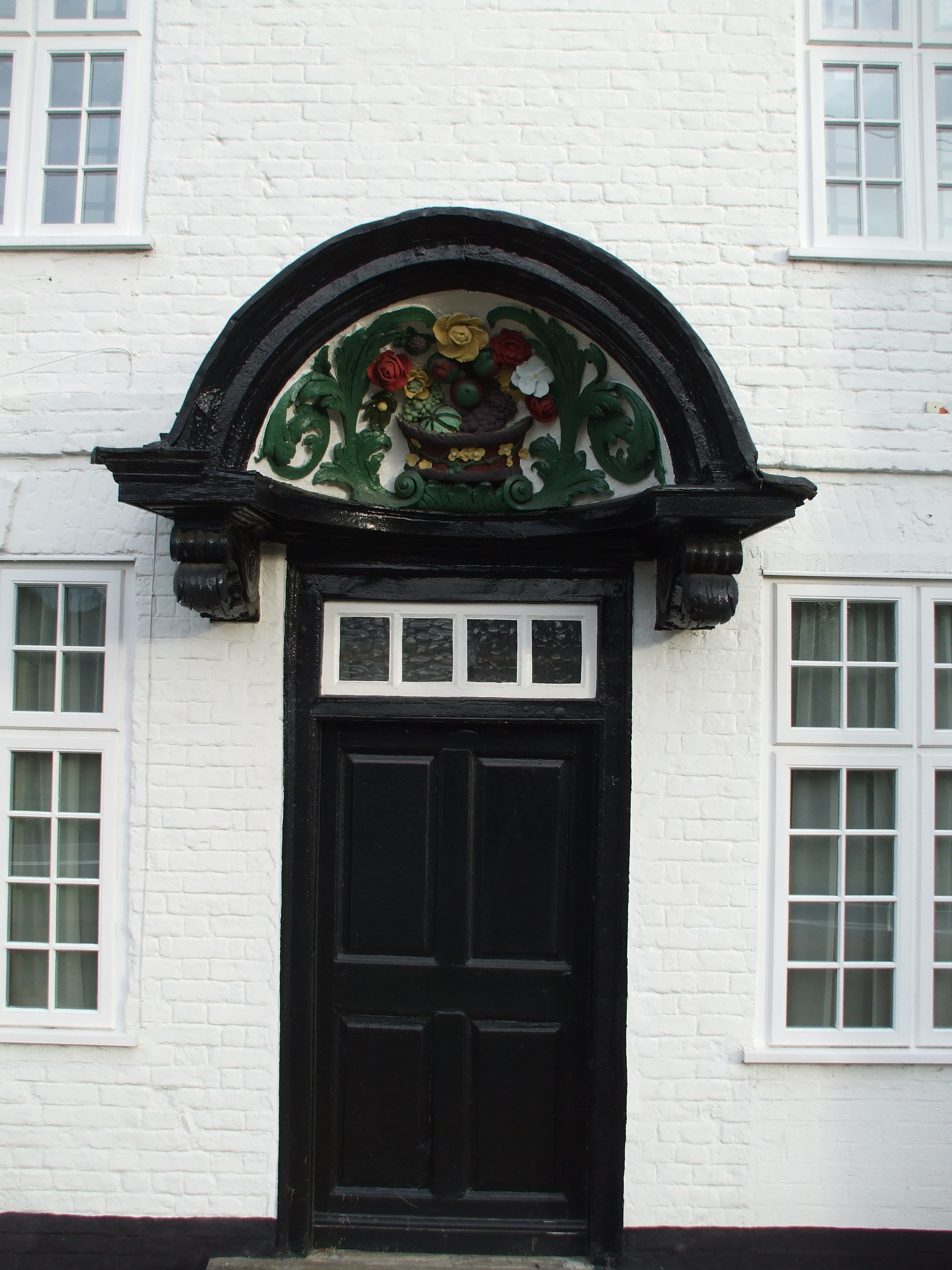
Doorway at Manor Farm

== Transport ==
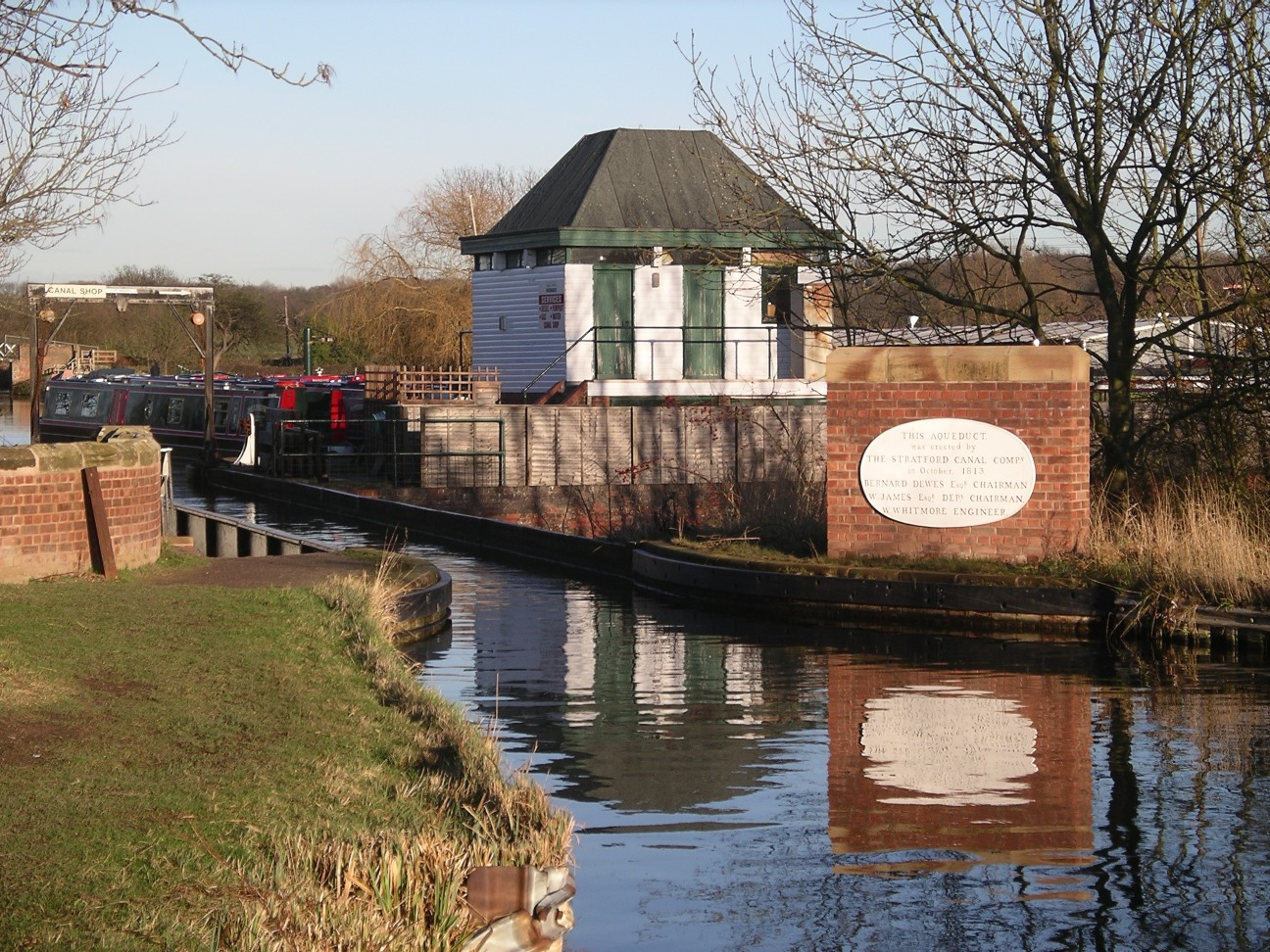
The Wootton Wawen Aqueduct on the Stratford-upon-Avon Canal

The A3400 (former A34) provides transport links to the neighbouring settlements, notably Birmingham and Stratford-upon-Avon and also connects to the M40 motorway northwards at Hockley Heath affording direct motorway access to London. Regular bus services on this road provide transport to Birmingham and Stratford-upon Avon.

The Birmingham and Stratford-upon-Avon Canal crosses the parish, leaving it near Silesbourne Farm, close to which there was a hermitage, mentioned in 1428 and 1470. The canal is carried over the main Stratford to Birmingham road by a cast-iron aqueduct bearing the date 1813. There are moorings and a canal boat marina in Wootton Wawen Basin. The canal was built by William James of Henley-in-Arden, who was later a pioneer of the railway system. A cast-iron plaque on the aqueduct records details of the building of the canal.

The Monarch's Way, a long-distance footpath which approximates to the escape route taken by Charles II in 1651 after his defeat in the Battle of Worcester, passes through Wootton Wawen.

Wootton Wawen railway station was opened in 1908 on a branch of the Great Western Railway. The route is now the Birmingham to Stratford Line. The line south of Stratford upon Avon railway station continued as the Honeybourne Line to Honeybourne railway station (which is on the Cotswold Line) and onwards to Cheltenham.

== Notable residents ==
In the Second World War, the Russian composer Nikolai Medtner and his wife lived in a secluded house outside Wootton Wawen, where he completed his Piano Concerto No. 3. Author Bill Watkins spent much of his youth in Wootton Wawen; his book A Celtic Childhood records his childhood adventures in and around the village during the 1950s. 'The Greens from Wootton Wawen' are mentioned in Theroux's travel book, The Pillars of Hercules.
