= Parveen Hassan =

British civil servant and conservative women's organizer

Parveen Hassan MBE
- Occupations: civil servant and conservative women's organiser
- Employer: Crown Prosecution Service
- Organization(s): National Black Crown Prosecution Association, Muslim Women's Network UK, Conservative Women's Hub, Conservative Friends of Bangladesh
- Political party: Conservative Party (UK)
- Website: www.parveenhassan.org.uk

Parveen Hassan MBE is a British civil servant and conservative women's organiser. She is the founder of the Conservative Women's Hub, chaired the Asian Women Domestic Violence Forum and led the first West Midlands Local Criminal Justice Board conference on forced marriage.

== Biography ==
Hassan lives in Acocks Green, Birmingham, West Midlands.

Hassan works as Inclusion and Community Engagement Manager for the Crown Prosecution Service and is a member of the National Black Crown Prosecution Association (NBCPA).

She is a Muslim and has served as the treasurer of the Muslim Women's Network UK, based in the Birmingham, since 2009. She has also chaired the Asian Women Domestic Violence Forum and led the first West Midlands Local Criminal Justice Board conference on forced marriage.

Hassan supports the Conservative Party (UK). She is the founder of the Conservative Women's Hub and co-chair of the Conservative Friends of Bangladesh.

In 2013, Hassan was honoured on BBC 100 Women list. In 2010, she was appointed a Member Of The Most Excellent Order Of The British Empire (MBE) in the New Year’s Honours list, recognised for her services to community engagement, inclusion, and equality.
