= Fox Hollies =

Area of Birmingham, England

Coordinates: 52.437°N 1.824°W

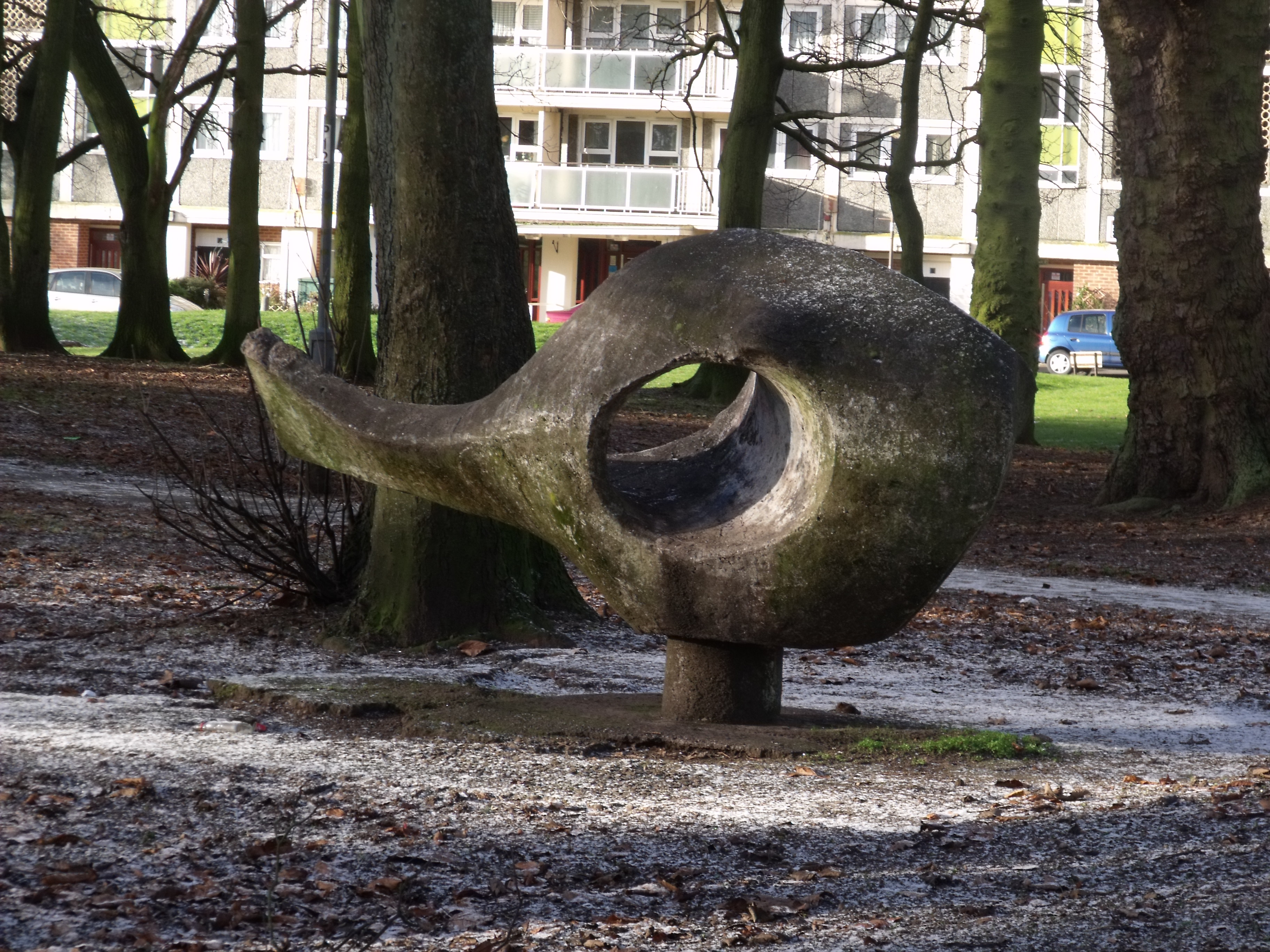
Fish-like sculpture, Curtis Gardens, Fox Hollies.

Fox Hollies is an area of Birmingham, England, situated on the edge of Acocks Green district. It is named after the Fox Hollies Hall estate.

It roughly includes the area around Fox Hollies Road (part of the A4040 Outer Ring Road), stretching from Acocks Green in the north, to Hall Green in the south. A showpiece housing estate was built to the east of Fox Hollies Road in the 1920s, around Fox Hollies Park. There was also a pub called the Fox Hollies at the junction of Fox Hollies Road and Olton Boulevard East, but this closed in 1997 and has since been demolished to make way for a supermarket.

Until 2004, one of the Birmingham City Council wards was named Fox Hollies. This area is now divided between the Acocks Green and Tyseley & Hay Mills wards.

The area is served by the nearby Spring Road railway station on the Birmingham to Stratford Line, and by several bus routes including the 11A/11C Outer Circle.

== Extent ==
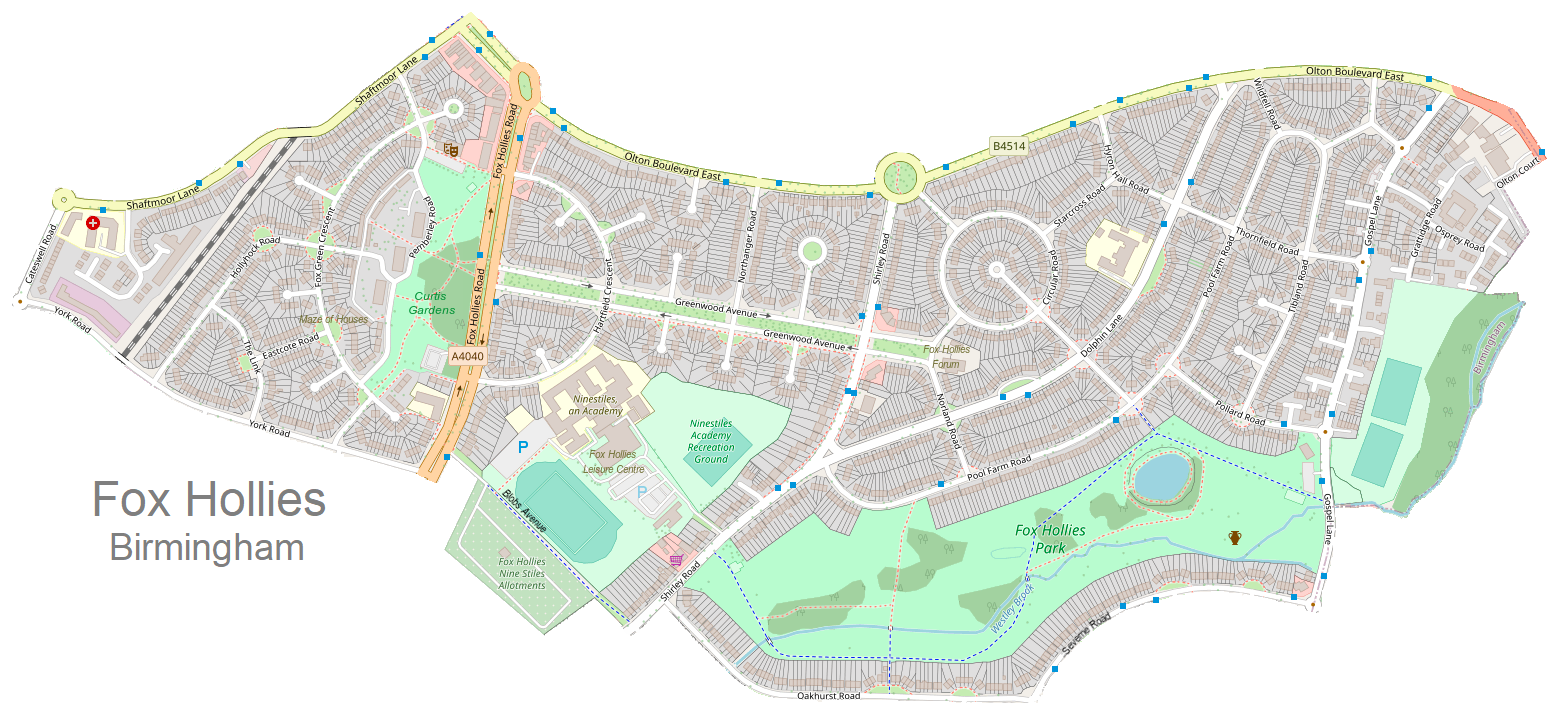
Fox Hollies, Birmingham, United Kingdom.

Fox Hollies, as defined by the extent of the Fox Hollies Hall Estate, developed by Birmingham City Council in the 1920s and 1930s. Bounded by (clockwise): Fox Hollies Road, York Road, Cateswell Road, Shaftmoor Lane, Olton Boulevard East, Gospel Lane, Severne Road, Oakhurst Road, Shirley Road, Blobs Avenue and back to Fox Hollies Road. Other definitions of Fox Hollies include the large Broom Hall Estate on the far side of Fox Hollies Park, but this was not part of the original Fox Hollies Hall Estate.

Fox Hollies Hall, demolished in the 1930s, was located in what are now Curtis Gardens, known locally as the Little Park, with the surviving gateposts to its grounds at the centre of a large circle, formed by Fox Green Crescent and Hartfield Crescent, straddling Fox Hollies Road, a former ancient ridgeway. Hartfield Crescent is the location of Ninestiles Academy secondary school, opened in 1929, which adjoins Fox Hollies Leisure Centre. The wide, tree-lined Greenwood Avenue extends eastwards from the centre of the circle to what is now the site of Fox Hollies Forum, organised by the Fox Hollies Community Association. To the south of this lies Fox Hollies Park, also known as Pool Farm Park, through which runs Westley Brook.
