= Yrd =

Yrd, or YRD, may refer to:

- The Yangtze River Delta in China
- Yrd, a common abbreviation for yard, a measure of length
- YRD, the IATA code for Dean River Airport, British Columbia, Canada
- YRD, the National Rail code for Yardley Wood railway station in the West Midlands, UK
