= Acocks Green (ward) =

Electoral ward of Birmingham City Council

Acocks Green ward is an electoral ward in south-east Birmingham, England, and following the boundary reorganisation of 1 December 2017 includes the areas of Acocks Green, Stockfield and Fox Hollies.

== Ward history ==
The parish of Yardley was included within Birmingham County Borough from 1911. The Birmingham ward was created in 1911 from part of the parish (which also created Sparkhill and Yardley wards). The electorate steadily climbed from 4,972 in 1911 to 17,333 in 1939.

The ward boundary changes of 1934 saw Acocks Green ward lose its western area to Sparkhill ward and its southern portion to a newly created Hall Green ward.

After the war the electorate again jumped to 24,556 in 1945 and climbed again until in 1949 it stood at 26,242. In the boundary changed of 1949/1950 the area south of Warwick Road was lost to Fox Hollies ward, and additional areas in Hay Mills and South Yardley (the northern boundary was the Coventry Road) were added. This moved the area covered substantially northwards. In the 1950 election the electorate had reduced to 16,412.

By the 1961 election the electorate had reduced to 14,390 and so the boundary changes of 1961/1962 once again saw the ward expanding. It took a small triangle of territory from Fox Hollies, and expanded northwards from the Coventry Road to Hob Moor Road. The electorate at the 1962 election was up to 20,570.

A further expansion of the boundaries was required at the changes in 1981/1982, and resulted in the loss of the area around Greet in the west of the ward, but the addition of areas north of Hob Mooor Road and south of Blakesley Road. The electorate increased from 19,133 in 1981 to 21,125 in 1982.

The boundary changes in 2003/2004 resulted in major changes, which saw the abolition of Fox Hollies ward and the creation of a South Yardley ward. Acocks Green ward therefore moved south to take substantial electors from Fox Hollies ward south of the Warwick Road, and restored the Grand Union canal as the northern boundary.

== Parliamentary Representation ==
The parish of Yardley was part of the Worcestershire Eastern Division from 1832 until 1918.

At the boundary changes for the 1918 election the parishes and its City Borough wards were incorporated within Birmingham constituencies. Acocks Green ward became part of Birmingham Moseley constituency in 1918, and the electorate steadily grew from 41,546 in 1918 until it reached 101,169 at the 1935 election.

In 1945 a small number of the very biggest constituencies were divided and Acocks Green joined Hall Green ward in the newly created Birmingham Acocks Green seat.

Birmingham Acocks Green constituency was short lived and in the wholesale boundary changes that preceded the 1950 election, the ward was joined by Fox Hollies and Yardley wards in a Birmingham Yardley seat.

Once again this seat only had a short life, although it remained as Birmingham Yardley the wards which made up the seat were changed for the 1955 election to Acocks Green, Sheldon and Yardley. This time the seat was more settled and was left alone at the changes for the 1974, 1983 and 1997 boundary changes.

In 2010 the seat was enlarged, following the loss of a Birmingham constituency, and included Stechford & Yardley North, together with the South Yardley and Sheldon wards.

== Politics ==
From its creation Acocks Green ward was generally a Conservative (or Liberal Unionist) seat, but occasional gains by Independents disrupted the pattern during the 1920s.

In 1945 Labour won the seat (plus a by-election) to give it representation for the first time. However, in 1946 the Tories regained the seat, and held on to it until 1952, when Labour won again. The seat was now more marginal and Labour won in 1954, 1956, 1958, 1963 and 1971.

The all out elections of 1973 (for the new Birmingham Metropolitan Borough), produced, as may have been expected, a split result, with two Tories and one Labour councillor. The Tories won all the elections for the ward in the 1970s, but then lost to Labour in 1980.

The boundary changes prior to the 1982 election once again produced a split result, again two Tories and one Labour councillor. The redrawn seat and the general demographics of the city meant that the new ward was a better bet for Labour and they duly won all the elections, until the Conservatives' good year of 1987, but that was a one off and Labour once again won in 1988.

However everything was about to change, and in 1990 the Liberal Democrats seized the seat. John Hemming, who was later to become the MP for the Yardley constituency, won for the first time. Conservative support haemorrhaged away from 1994 onwards and the Liberal Democrats won the ward at every election until 2011 when it swung strongly to Labour. Labour gained a second seat in 2012, but the Liberal Democrats held their remaining seat in the 2014 elections. The election in May 2022 saw the Liberal Democrats win both seats.

== Election results ==
* = incumbent councillor

NB The turnout figure includes spoilt papers and so will not agree with the cumulative votes cast for the candidates listed.

=== 2020s ===
7 May 2026
| Party | Candidate | Votes | % | ±% |
|---|---|---|---|---|
| Liberal Democrats | Roger Kingdon Harmer | 1,952 | 36.4 | ▼15.2 |
| Liberal Democrats | Penny Wagg | 1,486 | 27.7 | ▼15.3 |
| Reform | Danny Drennan | 1,147 | 21.4 | New |
| Green | A C Baker | 1,106 | 20.6 | ▲14.6 |
| Green | Sadia Mahmood Khan | 1,053 | 19.7 | New |
| Reform | Doctor Sanjeev Mehta | 987 | 18.4 | New |
| Labour | John Anthony O'Shea | 813 | 15.2 | ▼23.7 |
| Labour | Lu O'Shea | 577 | 10.8 | ▼24.7 |
| Workers Party | Sajid Mehmood Bhatti | 239 | 4.5 | New |
| Workers Party | Mohammed Afzal Tahir | 203 | 3.8 | New |
| Conservative | Tristan Thomas Griffiths-Hughes | 192 | 3.6 | ▼3.1 |
| Conservative | Dhiran Patel | 179 | 3.3 | ▼2.2 |
| TUSC | Jae Robinson | 52 | 1.0 | New |
| TUSC | Eamonn Kevin Flynn | 37 | 0.7 | ▼1.2 |
| Majority | | 339 | 6.3 | |
| Turnout | | | 32.8 | |
| Registered electors | | 16,334 | | |
| Liberal Democrats hold | | Swing | | |
| Liberal Democrats hold | | Swing | | |

5 May 2022
| Party | Candidate | Votes | % | ±% |
|---|---|---|---|---|
| Liberal Democrats | Roger Harmer * | 2,225 | | |
| Liberal Democrats | Penny Wagg | 1,856 | | |
| Labour | John O'Shea * | 1,679 | | |
| Labour | Ninna Isabel Makrinov | 1,531 | | |
| Conservative | Malik Zafar Iqbal | 288 | | |
| Green | Amanda Baker | 258 | | |
| Conservative | Sunil Shingadia | 239 | | |
| TUSC | Eamonn Flynn | 84 | | |
| Majority | | | | |
| Turnout | | | 26.99 | ▼2.23 |
| Registered electors | | | | |
| Liberal Democrats hold | | Swing | | |
| Liberal Democrats gain from Labour | | Swing | | |

=== 2010s ===
3 May 2018
| Party | Candidate | Votes | % | ±% |
|---|---|---|---|---|
| Labour | John O'Shea * | 2,249 | | |
| Liberal Democrats | Roger Harmer | 1,857 | | |
| Liberal Democrats | Penny Wagg | 1,737 | | |
| Labour | Fiona Williams | 1,521 | | |
| Conservative | Ali Wajad | 525 | | |
| Conservative | Luke Watson | 329 | | |
| Green | Amanda Baker | 201 | | |
| TUSC | Eamonn Flynn | 71 | | |
| Majority | | | | |
| Turnout | | | 29.22 | |
| Registered electors | | 16,028 | | |

5 May 2016
| Party | Candidate | Votes | % | ±% |
|---|---|---|---|---|
| Labour | John O'Shea | 2,760 | % | |
| Liberal Democrats | Penny Wagg | 2,136 | % | |
| Conservative | Richard Sparkes | 467 | % | |
| Green | Amanda Baker | 225 | % | |
| TUSC | Eamonn Flynn | 131 | % | |
| SDP | Alan Ware | 32 | % | |
| Majority | | 624 | | |
| Turnout | | 5,785 | 30.4 | |
| Registered electors | | 19,017 | | |
| Labour hold | | Swing | | |

7 May 2015
| Party | Candidate | Votes | % | ±% |
|---|---|---|---|---|
| Labour | Stewart Charles Stacey * | 4,741 | 44.3 | |
| Liberal Democrats | Penny Wagg | 2,846 | 26.6 | |
| UKIP | Gerry Moynihan | 1,390 | 13.0 | |
| Conservative | Richard John Sparkes | 1,174 | 11.0 | |
| Green | Amanda Baker | 397 | 3.7 | |
| TUSC | Eamonn Kevin Flynn | 108 | 1.0 | |
| SDP | Peter Johnson | 46 | 0.3 | |
| Majority | | 1,895 | | |
| Turnout | | 10,748 | 54.8 | |
| Registered electors | | 19,598 | | |
| Labour hold | | Swing | | |

22 May 2014
| Party | Candidate | Votes | % | ±% |
|---|---|---|---|---|
| Liberal Democrats | Roger Kingdon Harmer | 2,679 | 45.7 | |
| Labour | Rachel Seabright | 2,041 | 34.8 | |
| Conservative | Charlotte Hodivala | 372 | 6.3 | |
| Green | Amanda Baker | 422 | 7.2 | |
| TUSC | Eamonn Flynn | 254 | 4.3 | |
| SDP | Peter Johnson | 98 | 1.7% | |
| Majority | | 638 | 10.9 | |
| Turnout | | | | |
| Registered electors | | | | |
| Liberal Democrats gain from Labour | | Swing | | |

3 May 2012
| Party | Candidate | Votes | % | ±% |
|---|---|---|---|---|
| Labour | John O'Shea | 2,170 | 42.5% | |
| Liberal Democrats | Roger Kingdon Harmer * | 1,993 | 39.0% | |
| UKIP | Chris Whitehouse | 269 | 5.3% | |
| Conservative | Joseph Edginton | 247 | 4.9% | |
| Green | Amanda Baker | 168 | 3.4% | |
| BNP | S Taylor | 166 | 3.4% | |
| TUSC | B Rubery | 58 | 1.2% | |
| SDP | A Ware | 15 | 0.3% | |
| Majority | | 177 | | |
| Turnout | | 5,108 | 25.4% | |
| Registered electors | | 20,133 | | |
| Labour gain from Liberal Democrats | | Swing | | |

5 May 2011
| Party | Candidate | Votes | % | ±% |
|---|---|---|---|---|
| Labour | Stewart Stacey | 3,102 | 48.3% | |
| Liberal Democrats | Penny Wagg * | 2,161 | 33.7% | |
| Conservative | Joseph Edginton | 525 | 9.4% | |
| Green | Amanda Baker | 277 | 4.3% | |
| UKIP | John Butler | 275 | 4.3% | |
| Majority | | 941 | | |
| Turnout | | 6,459 | 32.6% | |
| Registered electors | | 19,787 | | |
| Labour gain from Liberal Democrats | | Swing | | |

6 May 2010 Electorate 19,721 Turnout 53.0%
| Party | Candidate | Votes | % | ±% |
|---|---|---|---|---|
| Liberal Democrats | Iain Bowen | 4,374 | 41.9% | |
| Labour | Stewart Stacey | 3,400 | 32.5% | |
| Conservative | Joe Edginton | 1,416 | 13.6% | |
| BNP | Carl Brisker | 686 | 6.6% | |
| Green | Amanda Baker | 280 | 2.7% | |
| UKIP | John Butler | 233 | 2.2% | |
| SDP | Alan Ware | 21 | 0.2% | |
| Majority | | 974 | 9.4% | |
| Liberal Democrats hold | | Swing | | |

=== 2000s ===
1 May 2008 Electorate 19,437 Turnout 27.4%,
| Party | Candidate | Votes | % | ±% |
|---|---|---|---|---|
| Liberal Democrats | Roger Harmer | 2,743 | 51.5% | |
| Labour | John O'Shea | 1,125 | 21.1% | |
| BNP | Tanya Whitehead | 617 | 11.6% | |
| Conservative | Emma Mahay | 598 | 11.2% | |
| Majority | | 1,618 | 30.4% | |
| Liberal Democrats hold | | Swing | | |

3 May 2007 Electorate Turnout %,
| Party | Candidate | Votes | % | ±% |
|---|---|---|---|---|
| Liberal Democrats | Penny Wagg | 3,072 | 52.0% | |
| Labour | John O'Shea | 1,452 | 24.6% | |
| BNP | Ben Lumby | 536 | 9.1% | |
| Conservative | Hannah Axford | 508 | 8.6% | |
| Green | Amanda Baker | 258 | 4.4% | |
| UKIP | Peter Hillman | 77 | 1.3% | |
| Majority | | | % | |
| Labour gain from Liberal | | Swing | | |
| Liberal Democrats hold | | Swing | | |

4 May 2006 Electorate Turnout %,
| Party | Candidate | Votes | % | ±% |
|---|---|---|---|---|
| Liberal Democrats | Iain Bowen | 2,607 | 43.0% | |
| Labour | John O'Shea | 1,632 | 26.9% | |
| BNP | Patrick Collins | 927 | 15.3% | |
| Conservative | Kenneth Axford | 630 | 10.4% | |
| Green | Mina Coalter | 261 | 4.3% | |
| Majority | | | % | |
| Labour gain from Liberal | | Swing | | |
| Liberal Democrats hold | | Swing | | |

6 May 2004 Electorate Turnout %,
| Party | Candidate | Votes | % | ±% |
|---|---|---|---|---|
| Liberal Democrats | Nicola Henry | 3,519 | % | |
| Liberal Democrats | Penelope Wagg | 3,502 | % | |
| Liberal Democrats | Francis Coyne | 3,463 | % | |
| Labour | John O'Shea | 1,289 | % | |
| Labour | Allen Samuel | 1,234 | % | |
| Labour | Suraiya Makhdoom | 946 | % | |
| BNP | Patrick Collins | 892 | % | |
| Conservative | Hilda Brien | 620 | % | |
| Conservative | Sarah Frankley | 624 | % | |
| Green | Richard Batsford | 581 | % | |
| Conservative | Ann Haston | 524 | % | |
| Majority | | | % | |
| Labour gain from Liberal | | Swing | | |
| Liberal Democrats hold | | Swing | | |

1 May 2003 Electorate 19,470 Turnout 27.2%,
| Party | Candidate | Votes | % | ±% |
|---|---|---|---|---|
| Liberal Democrats | J Whorwood | 3,596 | 68.0% | |
| Labour | S Makhdoom | 1,110 | 21.0% | |
| Conservative | E Lear | 560 | 10.6% | |
| Majority | | 2,486 | 47.0% | |
| Liberal Democrats hold | | Swing | | |

2 May 2002 Electorate 19,706 Turnout 29.1%,
| Party | Candidate | Votes | % | ±% |
|---|---|---|---|---|
| Liberal Democrats | John Hemming | 3,675 | 64.1% | |
| Labour | P Holbrook | 1,501 | 26.2% | |
| Conservative | Alan Bluemnthal | 501 | 8.7% | |
| Majority | | 2,174 | 37.9% | |
| Liberal Democrats hold | | Swing | | |

4 May 2000 Electorate 19,839 Turnout 25.6%,
| Party | Candidate | Votes | % | ±% |
|---|---|---|---|---|
| Liberal Democrats | D Osborn | 2,820 | 55.5% | |
| Labour | B O'Brien | 1,392 | 27.4% | |
| Conservative | B Roberts | 849 | 16.7% | |
| Majority | | 1,428 | 28.1% | |
| Liberal Democrats hold | | Swing | | |

=== 1990s ===
6 May 1999 Electorate 19,913 Turnout 26.3%,
| Party | Candidate | Votes | % | ±% |
|---|---|---|---|---|
| Liberal Democrats | J Whorwood | 2,694 | 51.4% | |
| Labour | B O'Brien | 1,814 | 34.6% | |
| Conservative | B Roberts | 699 | 13.3% | |
| Majority | | 720 | 16.8% | |
| Liberal Democrats hold | | Swing | | |

7 May 1998 Electorate 19,704 Turnout 26.1%,
| Party | Candidate | Votes | % | ±% |
|---|---|---|---|---|
| Liberal Democrats | John Hemming | 3,146 | 61.2% | |
| Labour | B O'Brien | 1,521 | 29.6% | |
| Conservative | J Hill | 471 | 9.2% | |
| Majority | | 1,625 | 31.6% | |
| Liberal Democrats hold | | Swing | | |

2 May 1996 Electorate 19,797 Turnout 30.1%,
| Party | Candidate | Votes | % | ±% |
|---|---|---|---|---|
| Liberal Democrats | David Osborne | 3,339 | 56.0% | |
| Labour | N Cunningham | 1,873 | 31.4% | |
| Conservative | P Osborn | 612 | 10.3% | |
| Independent | P Cartlidge | 124 | 2.1% | |
| Majority | | 1,466 | 24.6% | |
| Liberal Democrats hold | | Swing | | |

4 May 1995 Electorate 19,821 Turnout 35.0%,
| Party | Candidate | Votes | % | ±% |
|---|---|---|---|---|
| Liberal Democrats | N Biddlestone | 3,646 | 52.6% | |
| Labour | I Jamieson | 2,476 | 35.7% | |
| Conservative | D Hopwood | 752 | 10.8% | |
| Majority | | 1,170 | 16.9% | |
| Liberal Democrats hold | | Swing | | |

5 May 1994 Electorate 19,856 Turnout 43.1%,
| Party | Candidate | Votes | % | ±% |
|---|---|---|---|---|
| Liberal Democrats | John Hemming | 4,917 | 57.5% | |
| Labour | I Jamieson | 2,560 | 29.9% | |
| Conservative | D O'Hagan | 1,003 | 11.7% | |
| Majority | | 2,357 | 27.6% | |
| Liberal Democrats hold | | Swing | | |

7 May 1992 Electorate 20,056 Turnout 38.3%,
| Party | Candidate | Votes | % | ±% |
|---|---|---|---|---|
| Liberal Democrats | C Powell | 3,064 | 39.9% | |
| Conservative | D Clarke | 2,358 | 30.7% | |
| Labour | M Nangle | 1,993 | 25.9% | |
| Green | G Grianger | 101 | 1.3% | |
| SDP | M Hegarty | 84 | 1.1% | |
| Independent Labour | M Ariss | 67 | 0.9% | |
| Majority | | 706 | 9.2% | |
| Liberal Democrats gain from Labour | | Swing | | |

2 May 1991 Electorate 20,266 Turnout 44.9%,
| Party | Candidate | Votes | % | ±% |
|---|---|---|---|---|
| Liberal Democrats | P Scholfield | 5,017 | 55.1% | |
| Labour | Stan Yapp | 2,243 | 24.7% | |
| Conservative | A Unitt | 1,674 | 18.4% | |
| Green | P Gozra | 149 | 1.6% | |
| Majority | | 2,774 | 30.4% | |
| Liberal Democrats gain from Labour | | Swing | | |

3 May 1990 Electorate 20,611 Turnout 49.9%,
| Party | Candidate | Votes | % | ±% |
|---|---|---|---|---|
| Liberal Democrats | John Hemming | 4,197 | 40.8% | |
| Labour | P Haymeraj | 3,890 | 37.8% | |
| Conservative | A Clarke | 1,894 | 18.4% | |
| Green | S Higgens | 305 | 3.0% | |
| Majority | | 307 | 3.0% | |
| Liberal Democrats gain from Labour | | Swing | | |

=== 1980s ===
5 May 1988 Electorate 20,624 Turnout 39.2%,
| Party | Candidate | Votes | % | ±% |
|---|---|---|---|---|
| Labour | M Nangle | 4,223 | 52.2% | |
| Conservative | A Clarke | 3,121 | 38.6% | |
| SDP | B Buggins | 549 | 6.8% | |
| Green | J Bentley | 197 | 2.4% | |
| Majority | | 1,202 | 13.6% | |
| Labour hold | | Swing | | |

7 May 1987 Electorate 21,040 Turnout 44.5%,
| Party | Candidate | Votes | % | ±% |
|---|---|---|---|---|
| Conservative | P McAuley | 3,644 | 38.9% | |
| Labour | B Acker | 3,352 | 35.8% | |
| Alliance | C Powell | 2,374 | 25.4% | |
| Majority | | 292 | 3.1% | |
| Conservative gain from Labour | | Swing | | |

1 May 1986 Electorate 20,971 Turnout 37.5%,
| Party | Candidate | Votes | % | ±% |
|---|---|---|---|---|
| Labour | P Haymeraj | 3,269 | 41.6% | |
| Conservative | D Best | 2,512 | 31.9% | |
| Alliance | C Powell | 2,092 | 26.6% | |
| Majority | | 757 | 10.3% | |
| Labour gain from Conservative | | Swing | | |

3 May 1984 Electorate 21,190 Turnout 41.7%,
| Party | Candidate | Votes | % | ±% |
|---|---|---|---|---|
| Labour | M Nangle | 4,271 | 48.3% | |
| Conservative | C Collett | 3,458 | 39.1% | |
| Alliance | R de Havilland | 1,102 | 12.5% | |
| Majority | | 813 | 9.2% | |
| Labour gain from Conservative | | Swing | | |

5 May 1983 Electorate 21,063 Turnout 44.0%,
| Party | Candidate | Votes | % | ±% |
|---|---|---|---|---|
| Labour | B Acker | 4,186 | 45.2% | |
| Conservative | G Postles | 3,996 | 43.1% | |
| Alliance | R de Havilland | 1,058 | 11.4% | |
| Majority | | 190 | 2.1% | |
| Labour hold | | Swing | | |

6 May 1982 Electorate 21,125 Turnout 38.2%,
| Party | Candidate | Votes | % | ±% |
|---|---|---|---|---|
| Conservative | D Best | 3,163 | 39.2% | |
| Conservative | C Collett | 3,040 | 37.7% | |
| Labour | B Acker | 2,977 | 36.9% | |
| Labour | G Bradnock | 2,643 | 32.8% | |
| Conservative | G Postles | 2,794 | 34.6% | |
| Labour | W Jarvis | 2,449 | 30.3% | |
| Alliance | C Gray | 1,763 | 21.8% | |
| Alliance | P Jones-Owen | 1,686 | 20.9% | |
| Alliance | D Lawson | 1,567 | 19.4% | |
| Majority | | 520, | % | |
| Labour gain from Liberal | | Swing | | |
| Conservative hold | | Swing | | |

1 May 1980 Electorate 19,133 Turnout 37.2%,
| Party | Candidate | Votes | % | ±% |
|---|---|---|---|---|
| Labour | B Acker | 3,912 | 55.0% | |
| Conservative | L McCulloch | 3,104 | 43.6% | |
| National Front | B McEwan | 98 | 1.4% | |
| Majority | | 808 | 11.4% | |
| Labour gain from Conservative | | Swing | | |

=== 1970s ===
3 May 1979 Electorate 19,237 Turnout 70.9%,
| Party | Candidate | Votes | % | ±% |
|---|---|---|---|---|
| Conservative | D Rose | 6,917 | 50.7% | |
| Labour | B Acker | 6,724 | 49.3% | |
| Majority | | 193 | 1.4% | |
| Conservative hold | | Swing | | |

4 May 1978 Electorate 19,104 Turnout 37.7%,
| Party | Candidate | Votes | % | ±% |
|---|---|---|---|---|
| Conservative | C Collett | 3,795 | 52.6% | |
| Labour | B Acker | 3,078 | 42.7% | |
| National Front | C Finch | 297 | 4.1% | |
| Independent | P Tuey | 39 | 0.5% | |
| Majority | | 717 | 9.9% | |
| Conservative hold | | Swing | | |

6 May 1976 Electorate 19,483 Turnout 37.3%,
| Party | Candidate | Votes | % | ±% |
|---|---|---|---|---|
| Conservative | L McCulloch | 4,039 | 55.6% | |
| Labour | B Acker | 2,939 | 40.4% | |
| Liberal | D Precelton | 272 | 3.7% | |
| Majority | | 1,100 | 15.2% | |
| Conservative gain from Labour | | Swing | | |

1 May 1975 Electorate 19,776 Turnout 31.3%,
| Party | Candidate | Votes | % | ±% |
|---|---|---|---|---|
| Conservative | D Rose | 3,537 | 57.2% | |
| Labour | Levy | 2,105 | 34.0% | |
| Liberal | D Precelton | 541 | 8.7% | |
| Majority | | 1,432 | 23.2% | |
| Conservative hold | | Swing | | |

3 May 1973 Electorate 19,774 Turnout 29.9%,
| Party | Candidate | Votes | % | ±% |
|---|---|---|---|---|
| Conservative | C Collett | 3,281 | 55.4% | |
| Labour | B Acker | 3,105 | 52.5% | |
| Conservative | R Jauncey | 2,946 | 49.7% | |
| Labour | D Goodall | 2,920 | 49.3% | |
| Conservative | D Rose | 2,882 | 48.7% | |
| Labour | G Samuels | 2,632 | 44.4% | |
| Majority | | 361, 185 & 26 | 6.1%, 3.1% & 0.4% | |
| Conservative gain from Labour | | Swing | | |
| Conservative hold | | Swing | | |
| Labour hold | | Swing | | |

4 May 1972 Electorate 19,788 Turnout 35.5%,
| Party | Candidate | Votes | % | ±% |
|---|---|---|---|---|
| Labour | D Goodall | 3,635 | 51.8% | |
| Conservative | J Bailey | 3,383 | 48.2% | |
| Majority | | 252 | 3.6% | |
| Labour gain from Conservative | | Swing | | |

13 May 1971 Electorate 19,696 Turnout 36.9%,
| Party | Candidate | Votes | % | ±% |
|---|---|---|---|---|
| Labour | B Acker | 4,164 | 57.3% | |
| Conservative | M Taylor | 3,104 | 42.7% | |
| Majority | | 1,060 | 14.6% | |
| Labour gain from Conservative | | Swing | | |

7 May 1970 Electorate 19,638 Turnout 29.5%,
| Party | Candidate | Votes | % | ±% |
|---|---|---|---|---|
| Conservative | J Silk | 3,528 | 60.8% | |
| Labour | S Gray | 2,274 | 39.2% | |
| Majority | | 1,254 | 21.6% | |
| Conservative hold | | Swing | | |

=== 1960s ===
8 May 1969 Electorate 18,754 Turnout 29.1%,
| Party | Candidate | Votes | % | ±% |
|---|---|---|---|---|
| Conservative | J Bailey | 4,046 | 74.1% | |
| Labour | W Raybone | 1,414 | 25.9% | |
| Majority | | 2,632 | 48.2% | |
| Conservative hold | | Swing | | |

9 May 1968 Electorate 19,078 Turnout 32.5%,
| Party | Candidate | Votes | % | ±% |
|---|---|---|---|---|
| Conservative | C Collett | 4,802 | 77.5% | |
| Labour | R Thrupp | 1,394 | 22.5% | |
| Majority | | 3,408 | 55.0% | |
| Conservative hold | | Swing | | |

11 May 1967 Electorate 19,354 Turnout 33.2%,
| Party | Candidate | Votes | % | ±% |
|---|---|---|---|---|
| Conservative | J Silk | 4,468 | 69.5% | |
| Labour | J Morris | 1,962 | 30.5% | |
| Majority | | 2,506 | 39.0% | |
| Conservative hold | | Swing | | |

12 May 1966 Electorate 19,416 Turnout 40.9%,
| Party | Candidate | Votes | % | ±% |
|---|---|---|---|---|
| Conservative | J Bailey | 4,274 | 53.8% | |
| Labour | G Evans | 3,670 | 46.4% | |
| Majority | | 604 | 7.4% | |
| Conservative gain from Labour | | Swing | | |

13 May 1965 Electorate 19,733 Turnout 41.9%,
| Party | Candidate | Votes | % | ±% |
|---|---|---|---|---|
| Conservative | C Collett | 5,379 | 65.0% | |
| Labour | P Carter | 2,892 | 35.0% | |
| Majority | | 2,487 | 30.0% | |
| Conservative hold | | Swing | | |

7 May 1964 Electorate 20,019 Turnout 40.2%,
| Party | Candidate | Votes | % | ±% |
|---|---|---|---|---|
| Conservative | J Silk | 4,205 | 52.3% | |
| Labour | G Hartland | 3,832 | 47.7% | |
| Majority | | 373 | 4.6% | |
| Conservative hold | | Swing | | |

9 May 1963 Electorate 20,255 Turnout 38.8%,
| Party | Candidate | Votes | % | ±% |
|---|---|---|---|---|
| Labour | E Raven | 3,958 | 50.3% | |
| Conservative | L Howes | 3,908 | 49.7% | |
| Majority | | 50 | 0.6% | |
| Labour gain from Conservative | | Swing | | |

10 May 1962 Electorate 20,570 Turnout 38.1%,
| Party | Candidate | Votes | % | ±% |
|---|---|---|---|---|
| Conservative | C Collett | 4,276 | 54.5% | |
| Labour | W Pringle | 3,567 | 45.5% | |
| Majority | | 709 | 9.0% | |
| Conservative hold | | Swing | | |

11 May 1961 Electorate 14,390 Turnout 45.2%,
| Party | Candidate | Votes | % | ±% |
|---|---|---|---|---|
| Conservative | J Silk | 3,554 | 54.7% | |
| Labour | W Pringle | 2,944 | 45.3% | |
| Majority | | 610 | 9.4% | |
| Conservative gain from Labour | | Swing | | |

12 May 1960 Electorate 14,374 Turnout 5,506%,
| Party | Candidate | Votes | % | ±% |
|---|---|---|---|---|
| Conservative | H Seccombe | 3,523 | 64.0% | |
| Labour | W Pringle | 1,983 | 36.0% | |
| Majority | | 1,540 | 28.0% | |
| Conservative hold | | Swing | | |

=== 1950s ===
14 May 1959 Electorate 14,480 Turnout 49.2%,
| Party | Candidate | Votes | % | ±% |
|---|---|---|---|---|
| Conservative | C Collett | 4,051 | 56.9% | |
| Labour | J Walsh | 3,068 | 43.1% | |
| Majority | | 983 | 13.8% | |
| Conservative gain from Labour | | Swing | | |

8 May 1958 Electorate 14,739 Turnout 43.6%,
| Party | Candidate | Votes | % | ±% |
|---|---|---|---|---|
| Labour | A Taylor | 3,214 | 50.0% | |
| Conservative | C Collett | 3,210 | 50.0% | |
| Majority | | 4 | 0.0% | |
| Labour gain from Conservative | | Swing | | |

9 May 1957 Electorate 14,835 Turnout 44.1%,
| Party | Candidate | Votes | % | ±% |
|---|---|---|---|---|
| Conservative | J Vernon | 3,337 | 51.0% | |
| Labour | S Wall | 3,202 | 49.0% | |
| Majority | | 135 | 2.0% | |
| Conservative gain from Labour | | Swing | | |

10 May 1956 Electorate 15,142 Turnout 41.2%,
| Party | Candidate | Votes | % | ±% |
|---|---|---|---|---|
| Labour | J Walsh | 3,209 | 51.5% | |
| Conservative | J Vernon | 3,024 | 48.5% | |
| Majority | | 185 | 3.0% | |
| Labour gain from Conservative | | Swing | | |

12 May 1955 Electorate 15,339 Turnout 49.2%,
| Party | Candidate | Votes | % | ±% |
|---|---|---|---|---|
| Conservative | C Collett | 4,120 | 54.6% | |
| Labour | G Evans | 3,429 | 45.4% | |
| Majority | | 691 | 9.2% | |
| Conservative gain from Labour | | Swing | | |

13 May 1954 Electorate 15,549 Turnout 47.7%,
| Party | Candidate | Votes | % | ±% |
|---|---|---|---|---|
| Labour | S Wall | 3,805 | 51.3% | |
| Conservative | N Bradbeer | 3,614 | 48.7% | |
| Majority | | 191 | 2.6% | |
| Labour gain from Conservative | | Swing | | |

7 May 1953 Electorate 15,760 Turnout 45.4%,
| Party | Candidate | Votes | % | ±% |
|---|---|---|---|---|
| Conservative | S Postle | 3,677 | 51.4% | |
| Labour | S Wall | 3,472 | 48.6% | |
| Majority | | 205 | 2.8% | |
| Conservative hold | | Swing | | |

8 May 1952 Electorate 16,084 Turnout 55.2%,
| Party | Candidate | Votes | % | ±% |
|---|---|---|---|---|
| Labour | G Evans | 5,057 | 57.0% | |
| Conservative | B Davis | 3,822 | 43.0% | |
| Majority | | 1,235 | 14.0% | |
| Labour gain from Conservative | | Swing | | |

10 May 1951 Electorate 18,250 Turnout 46.1%,
| Party | Candidate | Votes | % | ±% |
|---|---|---|---|---|
| Conservative | N Bradbeer | 4,438 | 57.7% | |
| Labour | G Turner | 3,253 | 42.3% | |
| Majority | | 1,185 | 15.4% | |
| Conservative hold | | Swing | | |

11 May 1950 Electorate 16,412 Turnout 50.3%,
| Party | Candidate | Votes | % | ±% |
|---|---|---|---|---|
| Conservative | S Postle | 4,376 | 53.0% | |
| Labour | J Cole | 3,885 | 47.0% | |
| Majority | | 491 | 6.0% | |
| Conservative hold | | Swing | | |

=== 1940s ===
12 May 1949 Electorate 26,242 Turnout 52.8%,
| Party | Candidate | Votes | % | ±% |
|---|---|---|---|---|
| Conservative | B Davis | 7,512 | 54.2% | |
| Conservative | S Postle | 7,387 | 53.3% | |
| Labour | C Beer | 6,034 | 43.6% | |
| Labour | E Bartleet | 5,968 | 43.1% | |
| Majority | | 1,478 & 1,353 | 10.6% & 9.7% | |
| Conservative gain from Labour | | Swing | | |
| Conservative hold | | Swing | | |

1 November 1947 Electorate 26,109 Turnout 52.9%,
| Party | Candidate | Votes | % | ±% |
|---|---|---|---|---|
| Conservative | N Bradbeer | 7,949 | 57.5% | |
| Labour | V Jackson | 5,871 | 42.5% | |
| Majority | | 2,078 | 15.0% | |
| Conservative gain from Labour | | Swing | | |

2 November 1946 Electorate 25,580 Turnout 38.0%,
| Party | Candidate | Votes | % | ±% |
|---|---|---|---|---|
| Conservative | O Gloster | 5,031 | 51.8% | |
| Labour | H Wynshenck | 4,366 | 45.0% | |
| Communist | S Blackwell | 316 | 3.3% | |
| Majority | | 665 | 6.8% | |
| Conservative hold | | Swing | | |

3 November 1945 (2 seats) Electorate 24,556 Turnout 43.6%,
| Party | Candidate | Votes | % | ±% |
|---|---|---|---|---|
| Labour | W Kirby | 5,323 | 49.7% | |
| Labour | V Jackson | 5,314 | 49.6% | |
| Conservative | R Scorer | 3,807 | 35.5% | |
| Conservative | A Harrison | 3,541 | 33.1% | |
| Liberal | T Veitch | 1,485 | 13.9% | |
| Majority | | 1,516 & 1,507 | 14.2% & 14.1% | |
| Labour gain from Conservative | | Swing | n/a | |
| Labour gain from Conservative | | Swing | n/a | |
