= Einstellung =

English krautrock band

Einstellung are a krautrock/shoegaze band from Birmingham, England.

== Biography ==
Einstellung formed in 2004. In 2006, their debut album, Wings Of Desire, was released on CD on Chatterbox Records. At the same time, "Sleep Easy Mr Parker", a 28-minute, one-track CD single was released on Bearos. Both releases and their loud, heavy shows garnered them much attention (the unusually long, trance-inducing, krautrocker "Sleep Easy Mr Parker" appeared on the BBC website).

In 2007, Einstellung presented 'Das Land Ohne Musik' a concert featuring acoustic versions of songs from their Wings of Desire album with strings and piano parts added by pianist and composer Rich Batsford. A live album of the concert was released in early 2018. Later in 2007, they participated in the Project X Presents event at the Rainbow Warehouse, Digbeth, including another collaboration with Rich Batsford which also featured Islamic vocal group Aashiq al-Rasul.

More recently Wings Of Desire was released on double-vinyl on Capsule Records, and Einstellung now have their own label, Powerkrautrecords.

Einstellung's work has been likened to My Bloody Valentine ("Schwester" is probably the sort of thing people have been thinking of in the past when they have ventured similarities between Einstellung and My Bloody Valentine )Bardo Pond and Neu! amongst others.

== Band members ==
- Andrew Moscardo-Parker - Guitars
- Andrew Smart - Guitars
- Steve Hough - Bass
- Simon Rider - Drums

== Projects and related ==
- Andrew Moscardo Parker - Lash Frenzy, Sally (ex Katastrophy Wife)
- Andrew Smart - Mahakalpa, Sonic Waking
- Steve Hough - Torque, Lash Frenzy (ex Cable Regime, Godflesh, Grover, Krafla
- Simon Rider - Lash Frenzy (ex Grover, Moneygods
