= Kimichi School =

Location
- Eastbourne House; Yardley Road; Acocks Green; Birmingham, West Midlands, B27 6LL; England; 52.45286°N 1.81888°W

Information
- Type: Private boarding school
- Established: 8 September 2014
- Founder: Sally Alexander
- Department for Education URN: 141242 Tables
- Ofsted: Reports
- Chair: Kirstie Berry
- Head teacher: Chris Passey
- Gender: Coeducational
- Age: 9 to 18 (Including 6th Form)
- Enrolment: 65
- Capacity: 70
- School fees: £6,750 pa (years 5-11) £8,250 pa (years 12-13)
- Website: https://www.kimichischool.co.uk/

Kimichi School is a private secondary school specialising in music in Acocks Green, Birmingham, England. The school was founded in 2014 by Sally Alexander who was awarded an MBE for her Services to Education in HM The Queen's Birthday Honours 2021. The school occupies three buildings and its grounds cover approximately 1 acre (0.4 ha).

Headteacher Chris Passey was awarded Fellowship of the Chartered College of Teaching (FCCT), and was announced Teacher of the Year at the 2022 Education Awards. In March 2023, Alexander was also awarded Fellowship of the Chartered College of Teaching (FCCT)

== History ==
Kimichi School is housed in the buildings of Eastbourne House School, which closed in 2007. Eastbourne House School was founded in the 1930s and was originally located on the Warwick Road in Acocks Green. It later moved to 5 Dudley Park Road, Acocks Green, and in 1947 to 111 Yardley Road. It was run by Frank Moynihan who originally bought the building in an auction intending to turn it into a primary school. He was headmaster of the school until his son Patrick, who was a pupil at the school, took over as headmaster himself.

Kimichi Symphony Orchestra was founded in 2017 and, under the baton of Keith Slade, has produced several concert events in Birmingham and Prague featuring complex repertoire and often with staged or danced elements.

== Academics ==
The school offers GCSEs and A-Levels. Currently the A-Levels on offer are: Music, English, Maths, Art, and Psychology.
