= Fox Hollies Hall =

- Interactive map of the Fox Hollies Hall area

General information
- Type: Manor house
- Architectural style: Italianate
- Location: Acocks Green, Birmingham, England
- Coordinates: 52°26′15″N 1°49′18″W
- Completed: 1869
- Demolished: 1937

Fox Hollies Hall was a manor house situated in Acocks Green, Fox Hollies, Birmingham, England, belonging to the Walker family.

The Hall itself was built as a mock-Italianate in 1869 to replace the nearby Hyron Hall, and was commissioned by a retired merchant, Zaccheus Walker III. His father, Zaccheus Walker II, was an industrialist who was almost killed in the French Revolution had it not have been for his friendship with Robespierre.

By 1880, Zaccheus' health was deteriorating, and the Hall passed into the ownership of his son, Lieutenant-Colonel Zaccheus Walker IV, who was working as a draftsman at this time. Lt. Col. Walker was the chairperson of many local Boards and Committees, who helped to organise outings for children in the local schools, and after buying land close to the Hall in 1912, sold off a majority of the land between 1925 and 1926, at a total of £44,746; and the sales of land helped the village of Acocks Green to expand into an urbanized community.

Lt. Col. Walker died in 1930, and his funeral procession included his coffin draped with a Union Jack. By 1937, the decaying Hall was passed to the Parks Committee, and was demolished. The only surviving part of the hall are the pillars to the main gate, standing near a bus stop. Three tower blocks were built at the rear of the site in 1965, and the site of the hall itself is a public park.
