= Spring Road railway station =

Railway station in Birmingham, England

Spring Road
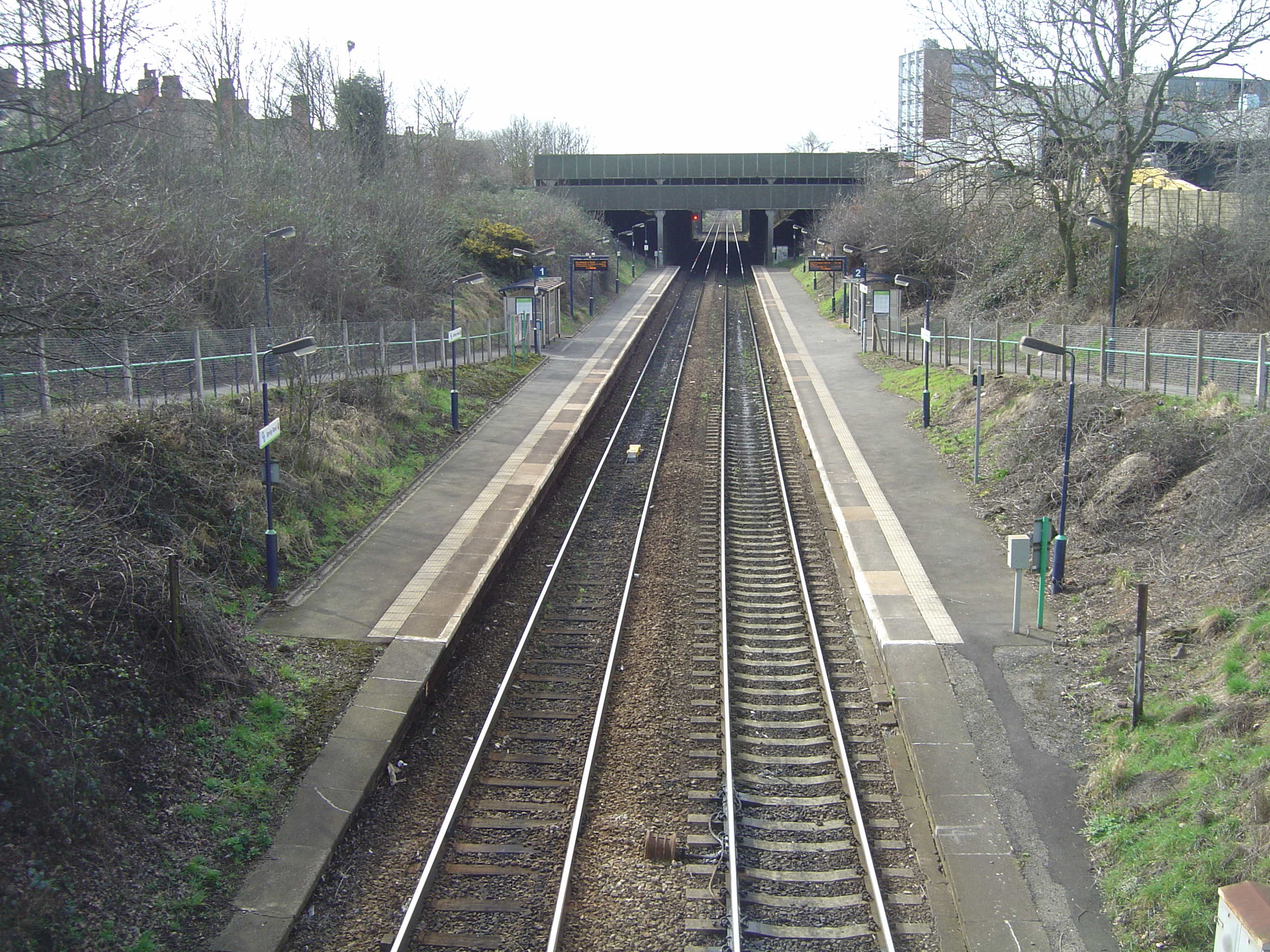

General information
- Location: Acocks Green, Birmingham; England
- Coordinates: 52.444371°N 1.836156°W
- Grid reference: SP111828
- Manager: West Midlands Trains
- Transit authority: Transport for West Midlands
- Platforms: 2

Other information
- Station code: SRI
- Fare zone: 3
- Classification: DfT category E

History
- Opened: 1908

Passengers
- 2021/22: ▲0.107 million
- 2022/23: ▲0.121 million
- 2023/24: ▲0.139 million
- 2024/25: ▲0.162 million
- 2025/26: ▲0.196 million
Location
Notes
- Passenger statistics from the Office of Rail and Road

Spring Road is a small railway station in the Acocks Green area of Birmingham, England. It is situated on the North Warwickshire Line, between Tyseley and Hall Green stations. The station, and all trains serving it, are operated by West Midlands Railway.

== History ==
The station was opened in 1908 as a halt named Spring Road Platform to ease traffic from the station at Tyseley, and to serve a cluster of cottages on the nearby land, which were owned until 1925 by the landowner at Fox Hollies Hall, Zaccheus Walker IV. The station consisted of two platforms with shelters, with ramps leading from street level to the station below. Passengers had to purchase their tickets on the train.

The station served as a request stop for the railmotor excursions throughout the years before the First World War, with Acocks Green building up around it. Zaccheus Walker IV, who was a well-respected philanthropist in the area, used the station for school trips (paid for by him personally) to the countryside and Stratford upon Avon.

At the end of the Second World War, a factory consisting of two buildings was built alongside the station, belonging to Lucas. The larger of the two known as BW3 and BW4 were later sold to Magneti Marelli in the early 1990s, before passing into the hands of Denso in 2003. The smaller BW5 stayed in the hands of Lucas as part of Lucas Aerospace. Lucas was bought out by TRW in 1998, BW5 has been in the hands of Goodrich since October 2002 when TRW sold off all its aerospace businesses.

In the 1950s, a permanent ticket-office was placed at the top of the ramp leading to Platform 1 (towards Birmingham). An older shelter at the top of this ramp built after the Second World War was converted into a toolshed, which it is used as today.

Workers at the factory first used the station to travel to and from work, which kept the station open during the era of the Beeching Axe, but traffic became less with the appearance of the private car.

== Services ==
West Midlands Trains run local services every 30 minutes as part of the Snow Hill lines:

The off-peak service pattern Mondays to Saturdays is as follows:

- 2 trains per hour westbound to Kidderminster via Birmingham Moor Street, Birmingham Snow Hill and Stourbridge Junction, with some evening services continuing onward to Worcester.
- 2 trains per hour eastbound to Whitlocks End, one of which continues to Stratford-upon-Avon.

On Sundays, there is an hourly service each way – westbound to Worcester Foregate Street via Birmingham, and southbound to Stratford-upon-Avon.

Preceding station	National Rail	Following station
Tyseley	West Midlands Railway; Worcester – Kidderminster – Birmingham - Whitlocks End – Stratford; Snow Hill lines	Hall Green
