= Rich Batsford =

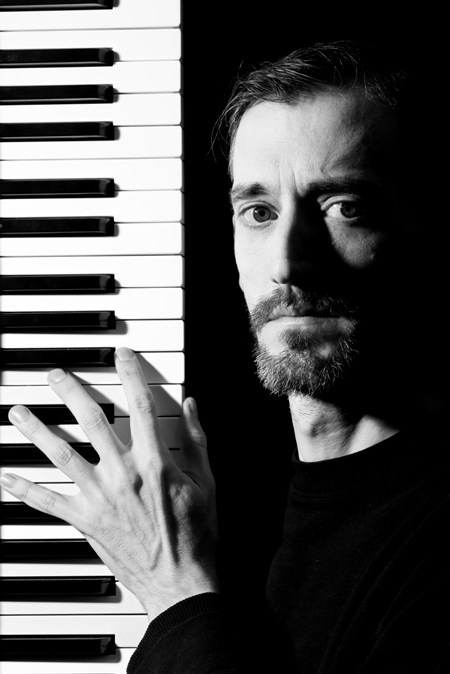

Background information
- Born: Richard William Batsford; 25 October 1969 (age 56); Birmingham, England
- Instrument: Piano
- Website: richbatsford.com
- Rich Batsford's spoken voice recorded January 2013

Richard William Batsford (born 25 October 1969) is an English pianist, composer and singer-songwriter. He is a recording artist and a frequent performer, initially in and around his birthplace in Birmingham, England, and more recently in Adelaide, Australia, presenting concerts featuring original solo piano music with a classical influence.

Batsford is also a co-creator of creative network Project X Presents and Musituality, a platform for musicians of various faiths to perform together.

== Biography ==
=== Early life ===
Born in Birmingham, Batsford lived from early childhood in and around the suburban Moseley area, known as a focal point for the city's musical and creative communities. Beginning his musical and vocal training as a choirboy in St Mary's Church, he went on to sing in the National Youth Choir and the CBSO Chorus.

=== Early career ===
In the 1990s, Batsford performed as singer and main songwriter in indie guitar-based bands including Maroon. Two of his dark, short stories were published in fiction magazines in the UK and America. For ten years, he booked and promoted comedy show The GAG Club, worked as a booking agent and artist agent as well as performing as a stand-up comic, and he was one of the original partners in setting up the Birmingham Comedy Festival. He wrote numerous preview articles about stand-up comedy and classical music for the Metro Newspaper and appeared as an actor in 'Perfect Scenario', a featurette produced as an extra for the BBC DVD release of Doctor Who serial 'Frontier in Space'.

== Solo career ==
In 2007, Batsford collaborated with krautrock/shoegaze band Einstellung, for a concert named 'Das Land Ohne Musik' in which Batsford both supported and accompanied the band, highlighting elements of post-rock shared by both artists. A live album recording of the concert was released in early 2018.

In September 2009, Batsford released Valentine Court, a debut album of solo piano music on his own Mouflon Music label, drawing comparisons with minimalist composers Steve Reich and Philip Glass and impressionist Claude Debussy. A new recording of the album was released in 2018 entitled Valentine Court Recaught.

In 2009, he made his major festival debut with an appearance at The Big Chill music festival performing in the Vida La Vida tent curated by ambient DJ Mixmaster Morris and was given an encore. Other festival appearances include Gigbeth, Drop Beats Not Bombs and ArtsFest - the latter on an outdoor stage in Birmingham's Centenary Square.

In June 2011, he showcased Mindfulmess, an album of songs with a well received concert at mac (the Midlands Arts Centre). The album, released in 2012, features lyrics partly inspired by his Buddhist spiritual practice, with elaborate vocal harmonies owing a debt to a lifelong appreciation of pop artist Brian Wilson, all accompanied by his delicate trademark piano patterns.

He performed his show Mindfulmess at both the Edinburgh and Melbourne Fringes in 2012 and the Adelaide Fringe in 2013 presenting a biographical performance which was praised by Fringe Review for its "harmonious and artful transitions from light to dark, despondent to hopeful". He performed at the Adelaide fringe again in 2014, with a show called "Classically Chilled Piano", which was rated as an 'Outstanding Show' by Fringe Review and again in 2015, with a show called "Piano Amoroso".

His third album, In The Moment, a collection of ten solo piano improvisations was released in 2014. Also in 2014 Batsford was chosen via a competitive process to compose and perform a score to Australian silent feature film, Robbery Under Arms.

A piano piece called "Saticity" has been included in the release of Erik Satie et les Nouveaux Jeunes Version 2, an album of tributes to the composer Erik Satie by French label Arbouse Recordings and another, "Mysterious Moment", on an album by Greek pianist Kosmas Lapatas.

In early 2016, Batsford collaborated with projection artist Zero from Illuminart, to produce an audio visual project called "Piano Illuminato", which was presented in Adelaide Town Hall.

Batsford's own recordings of his solo piano music have been broadcast on Australia's national classical radio station ABC Classic FM.

He also composes choral music using Buddhist texts, under his Buddhist name, Sarvadarśin.

Since July 2018 a relationship with US digital label Sonder House has resulted in the release of several solo piano tracks, and also an EP recorded in collaboration with Australian sound artist, Jason Sweeney.

Batsford plays a Roland FP4 digital piano.

== Collaborative projects ==
=== Project X Presents ===
Batsford co-created the creative network Project X Presents with Marc Reck, Anne-Marie Pope and Anthony Ramm, producing a series of five events dubbed "Omnimedia Experiences" beginning with Like Fxck in July 2006 in the Epic Skate Park in Birmingham. The events featured artists from a wide range of disciplines coming together to blend their work into a seamless, immersive event lasting up to seven hours, usually presented across three stages, with the audience in the middle The Birmingham Post described the event as "destabilising the established role of the 'spectator' in performance theatre and drawing you in to an impressively eclectic and complex mix of art forms".

=== Musituality ===
The Musituality project grew out of a series of concerts called "Music by Candlelight" St Mary's Church, Moseley, organised by Rich Batsford as part of the Moseley Festival. The concert held in July 2008 included a small choir called St Mary's Schola, which consists of a double quartet of singers drawn from St Mary's Church Choir, alongside performances of Qawwali and nasheed from Islamic vocal group A'ashiq Al Rasul.

Inspired by the success of the event, in particular the coming together of Christian and Islamic elements in a Christian building, Mick Perrier of St Marys Schola and Amran Ellahi of A’ashiq Al Rasul joined with Rich Batsford to create Musituality—a portmanteau combining the words music and spirituality. The project was launched to a full capacity audience at Birmingham Cathedral in 2009 in a concert well received by the local music community.

A further concert in 2010 at the Birmingham Buddhist Centre saw the same collaboration.

== Personal life ==
Batsford stood as candidate for the Green Party in Acocks Green ward in the 2004 local government elections. In 2012 he emigrated to Adelaide, Australia, where he became involved with the Adelaide Buddhist Centre. He was ordained into the Triratna Buddhist Order as Dhammacārī Sarvadarśin ("Sarvadarśin" being a name meaning "all seeing") in New South Wales.

He developed Dupuytren's contracture, for which he underwent successful surgery at Queen Elizabeth Hospital, Adelaide in 2013.

== Discography ==
- 2009: Valentine Court
- 2011: Mindfulmess
- 2014: In the Moment
- 2018: Valentine Court Recaught
- 2022: Fallen Rain

== Bibliography ==
- various (18 May 2012). Poetry & Prose. Life is Short Publications. (includes poems by Batsford)
