= Chris Tye =

English singer-songwriter

Chris Tye is an English singer-songwriter born in Nuneaton, now based in Birmingham, who took part in the BBC Music Live in Birmingham Event in 2015, hosted by Jo Whiley.

His first album Somewhere Down The Line was released in 2006 with the artwork being designed by Cally Callomon.

In 2011, he released Matchbox Stand which he recorded in Brighton with Tim Bidwell (Kate Walsh).

Since 2006 he has played support to a number of acts including Amy Winehouse, Fionn Regan, Joan As Police Woman, Bic Runga, Teddy Thompson, Stephen Fretwell, Robert Post and Ben Thomson.

In 2009, he participated in the Project X Presents event Xhibition.

Chris Tye appeared at The Big Session Festival in June 2012

The album Paper Grenande was released in 2014 and was being part funded through Pledge
