= Project X Presents =

Project X Presents was a collaborative arts network based in Birmingham, England, active from around 2004 to 2009. The group produced a series of themed performance events in the city which they christened "omnimedia experiences".

== Origins ==
The network was centred on Rich Batsford, Marc Reck, Anne-Marie Pope and Ant Ramm, who become friends during shared participation in various creative endeavours including the Fierce! festival and the music and party scene based in and around the Birmingham suburb of Moseley. Their intention was to create a new form of live event enabling each participant to further their own practice, as well as to learn from engaging with other disciplines. The show would involve and engage the audience at different levels, leading them on a potentially transformative journey.

== Practice ==
The group coined the phrase "omnimedia experience" to describe a new kind of event to potentially include any kind of creative endeavour such as a wide variety of styles of music along with stand up comedy, poetry, physical theatre, dynamic visual projections, dance, set design, costume, make up, interactive installations and even aroma.

Through an organic collaborative process, the group took all these many disparate and diverse strands and wove them together into one seamless, immersive, holistic whole, so the many parts effectively become one.

The core structure around which the events evolved was an experiential narrative, a series of stages defining the mood which the group aimed to lead the audience through. This was developed from the observation that audiences engage with different types of performance in different ways and that sequenced sections could lead the audiences through progressively elevated emotional states, as though they were experiencing a whole series of different events, but all combined into one seamless experience. The experiential narrative structure for the first event was "meditation, exploration, celebration."

A modular composition technique was developed to program a sequence of acts around this structure, centred mainly around the music along with stand up comedy and poetry. Each group or individual was asked to collaborate with those performing directly afterwards and before them create a new segue section. This was designed to stimulate the production of exciting new work and create the seamless ongoing experience for the audience. Dynamic visual projections, sets and physical theatre performances were also added to complement and enhance the action.

The ethos was one of shared effort for the common good, no one was paid for their time and most of the equipment was borrowed or provided by the participants themselves. Two small grants were received from the Arts Council. Decision making was organic, consensual and collective and there was a conscious effort to demonstrate the possibilities of positive and cooperative action. The process arose out of friendship and continued in that vein throughout.

Each performance was delivered in a different venue, making use of spaces that aren't usually used for live performance. Those involved in production had access to the space for the whole week leading up to the main performance, to assemble the staging, sound, lighting and set design. Each performance was preceded by a full dress rehearsal.

Anne-Marie Pope took a major role in coordinating and producing the early events along with Ant Ramm and Rich Batsford who also acted as music coordinator. Former BRMB rock DJ Robin Valk assisted with music programming.

== Events ==
=== Like Fxck ===
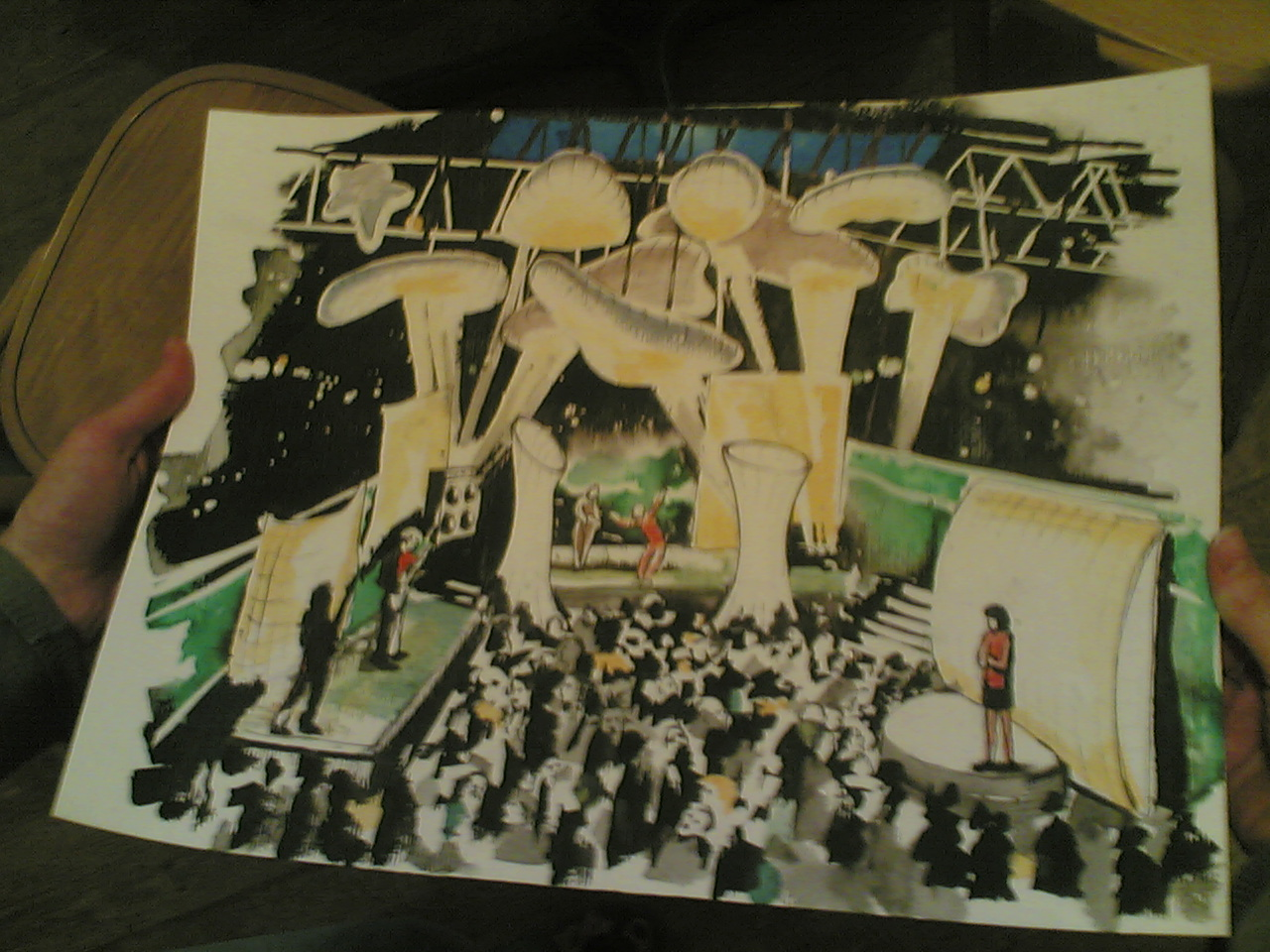
Project X Presents design by Martin Vernon

The first event, held at the Epic Skate Park in Moseley, on 8 July 2006, 18 months in the planning and named Like Fxck in recognition of its ambitious and seemingly improbable nature, ran for six hours with performances running continuously on three different stages and a sell out audience located in the space created in the middle. At various times performances would take place either on one stage or sometimes two or all three. The event was billed as "a cabaret for the clubbing generation" and was likened to a 1960s happening and a "pseudo-symphony".

Performers included The Destroyers, a 13-piece gypsy klezmer band, who participated in an ‘aural fight’ with pop/punk outfit Koala Grip, stand up comedian Reginald D. Hunter, pianist/composer Rich Batsford, DJ Marc Reck, electronica composer Iain Amstrong, Jazz duo Ralph Allin and Jadie Carey, VJ Chromatouch, an experiment using sound frequencies to physically affect the bodies of the audience, singer/songwriter Richard Burke, Unterwelt, a physical theatre troupe created specially for the event including actress Lucy Holtom, actor Adam Skerrett and performance manager Chris Skerrett, a world music ensemble and techno belly dancers. A video was made recording elements of the event.

For the set design, scenic artist Martin Vernon used withy to sculpt various structures which were illuminated to dramatic effect.

=== Gigbeth ===
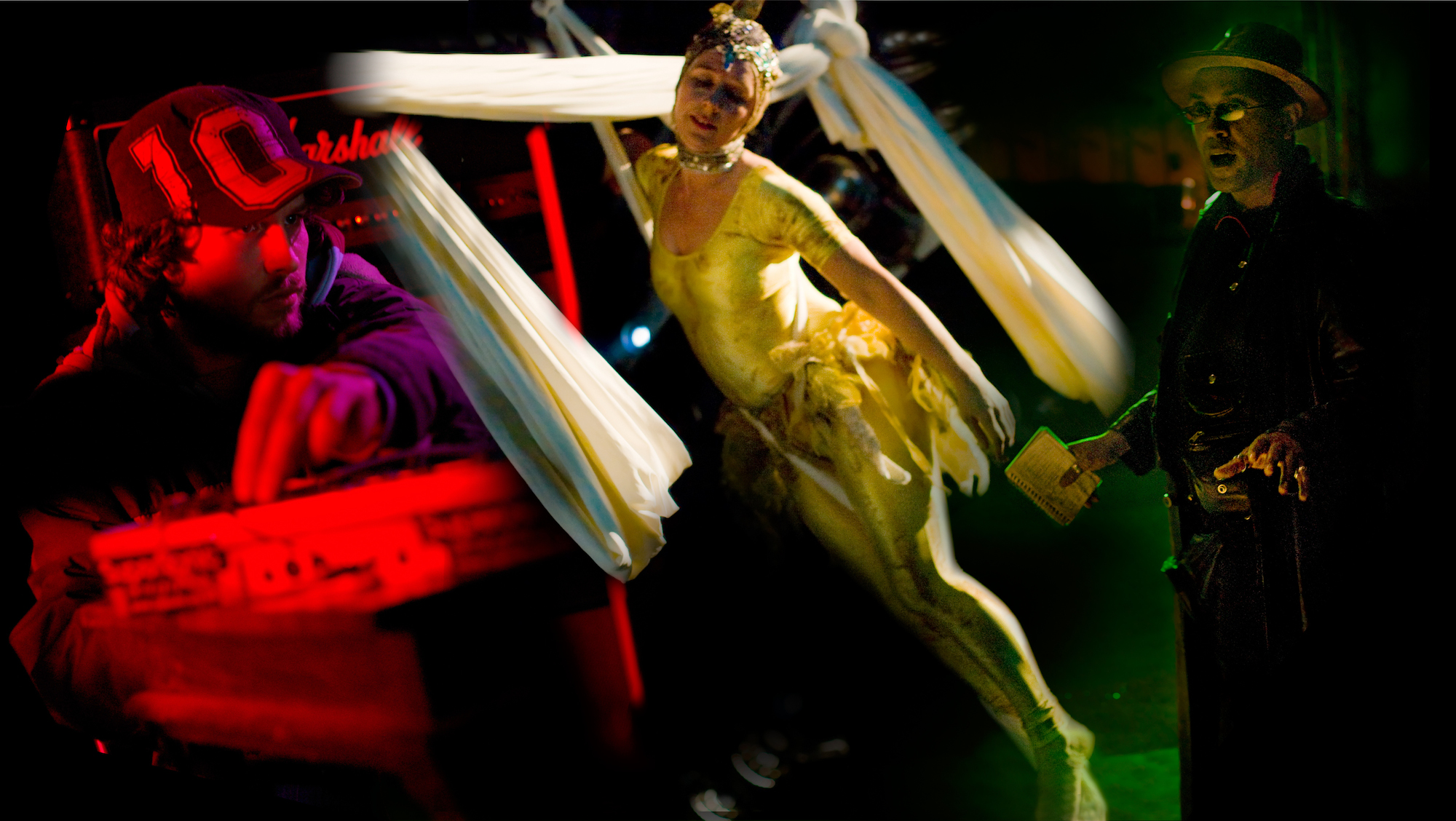
The 2007 event

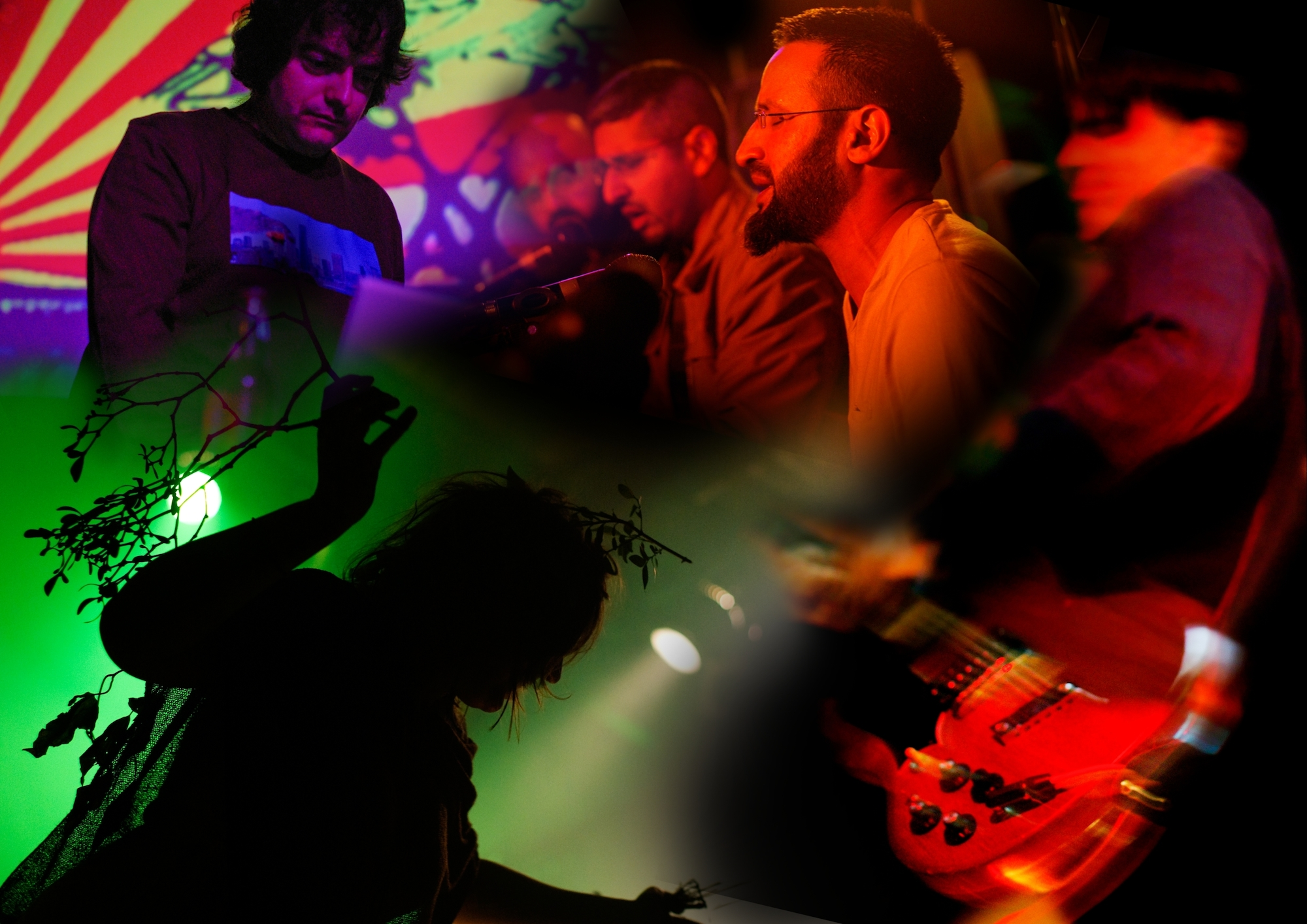
The 2007 event

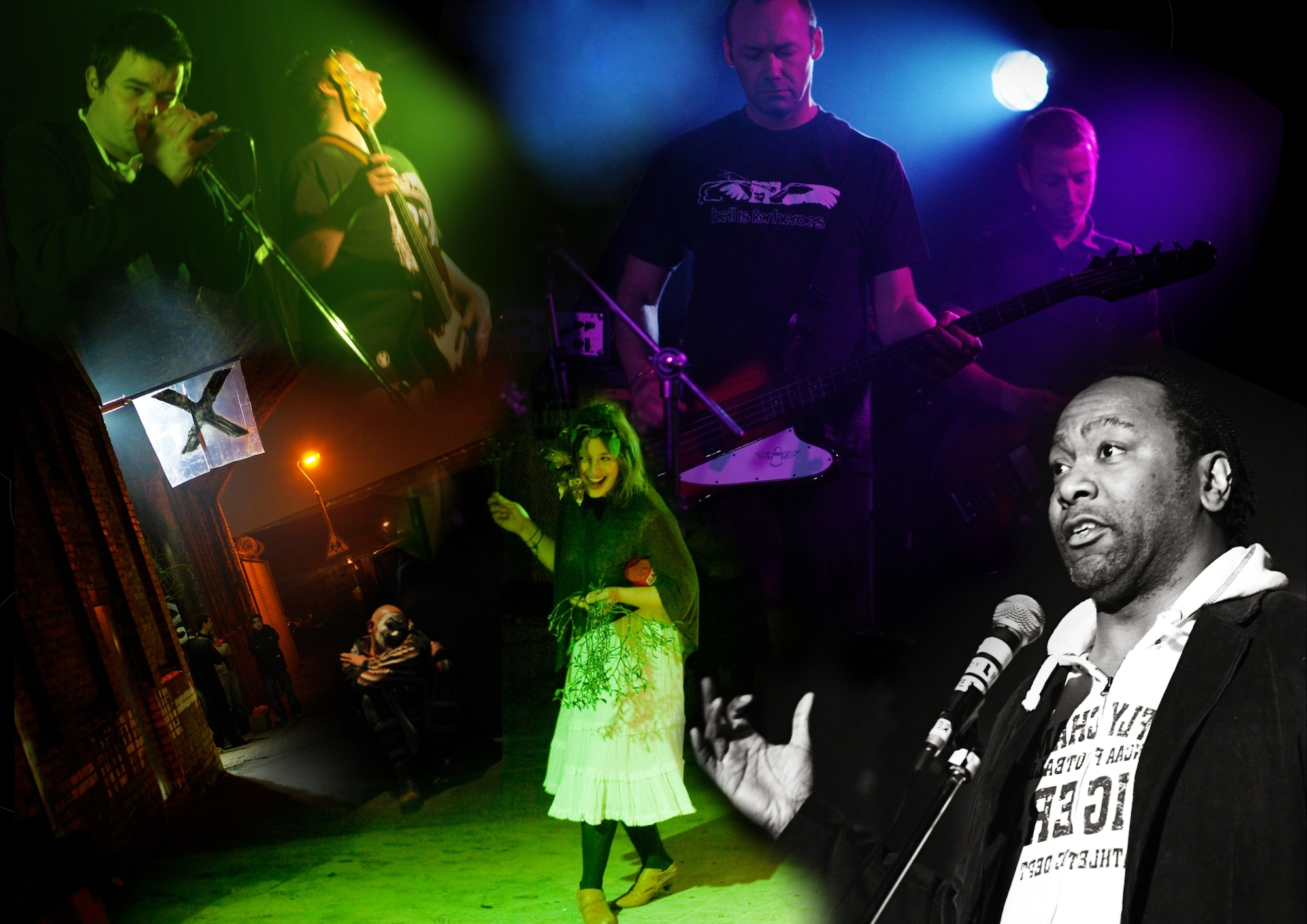
The 2007 event

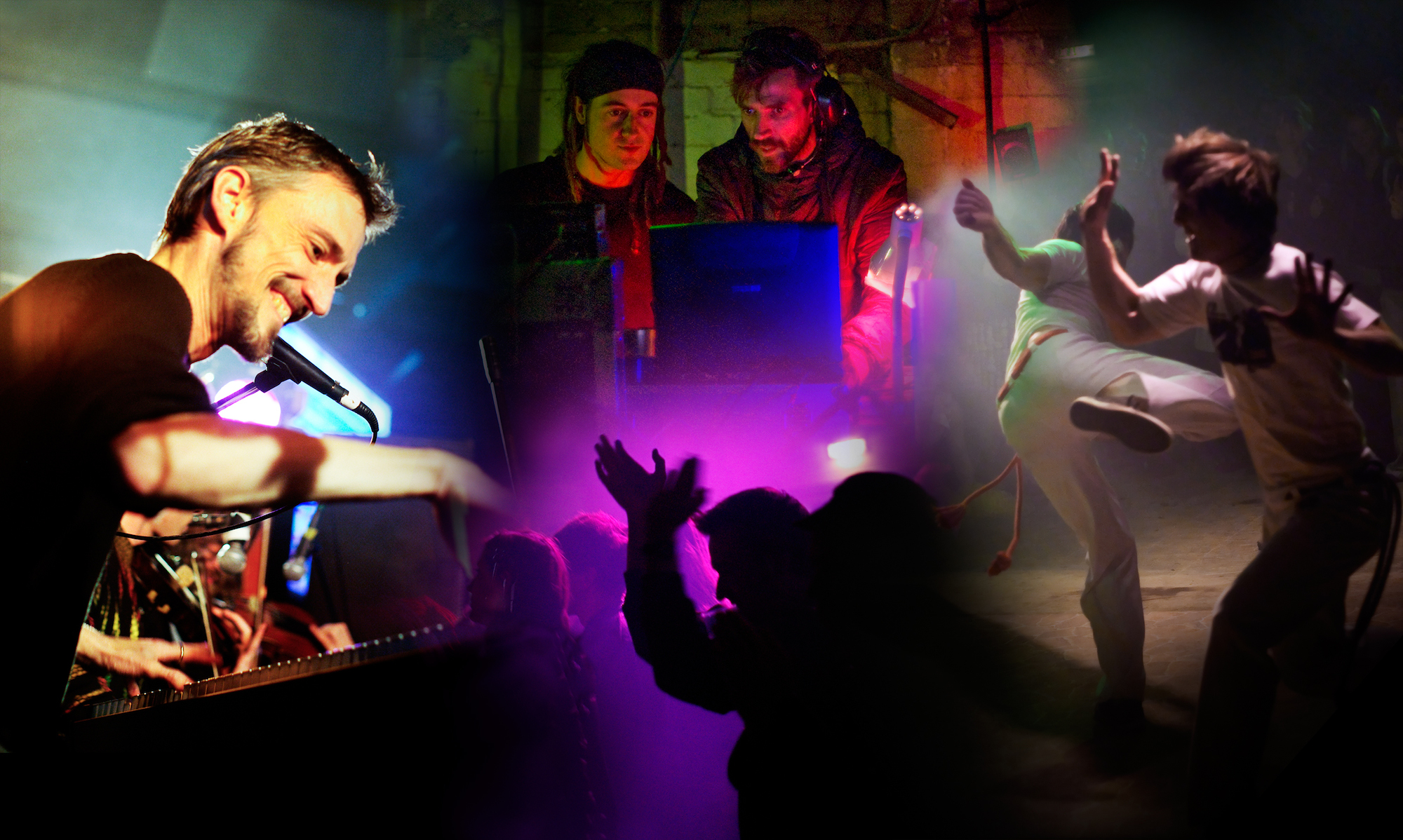
The 2007 event

An event at the Rainbow Warehouse, Digbeth, Birmingham, on 3 November 2007, presented as the pinnacle of the weekend’s Gigbeth music festival, taking a more theatrical approach than the first show and centring on a narrative based on the Hero's Journey by Joseph Campbell which takes its structure from Campbell’s study of the great myths and legends. Characters included a demonic clown, semi-deranged Bacchic priestesses performed by the Kindle Theatre Company, actress Rahil Liapopolou, Lucy Nicholls, capoeira dancers and other "strange, shady characters", in a performance directed by Pyn Stockman.

Musical highlights included Islamic vocal group Aashiq al-Rasul and instrumental heavy post-rock band Einstellung who produced a collaboration also including the minimalist piano of Rich Batsford and a new incarnation of the 'aural fight' this time comprising a digital vs analogue sound clash.

The show was described as "a seamless six hour journey of fantasy and light" by Bearded recognising a progression created by adding another screen between each of the stages to those directly above each stage, to effectively create a 360-degree visual environment. The Birmingham Post called it "an intelligent and unique show destabilising the established role of the 'spectator' in performance theatre and drawing you in to an impressively eclectic and complex mix of art forms."

A video was produced explaining the event, noting some of the acts and the group's links with other creative organisations in Birmingham.

=== XLab VL ===
The smaller of two events in 2008, held at Concrete, in Birmingham's Jewellery Quarter, on 22 February, included an audio/visual performance from VJ Chromatouch and the genesis of the Object X team who created a series of interactive art installations. A performance from pianist Rich Batsford was transmitted in real time to the venue from Adelaide University via the internet and the music also featured experimental electronica from Steve Loopz and indie pop from Shana Tova.

=== Digital Dystopia ===
The Digital Dystopia event on 13 September 2008, explored the darker side of the digital revolution including the threats of CCTV, ID Cards and online tracking with music including Subsource (live breakbeat, rave, metal), ambient DJ Mixmaster Morris, ska band 360, romany punk from Daz and Anne from Mamamatrix, downtempo electronica from Arc Vel and burlesque pop from Lil Ms Vix Buzzfox aka Vix from 1980s rockers Fuzzbox. The event culminated in a combined DJ/AV set from Marc Reck and Liam d’Authreau with a programmed narrative which marked the start of Reck’s DJ Narrative project. Spoken word artists included a number of local poets affiliated as Wrote Under, Louise Stokes and a third Project X appearance from comedian Reginald D. Hunter.

The "Object X" (David Checkley, Paul Kent, Richard Hubbard) group produced a number of hand held synthesisers nicknamed 'buzz boxes' which were distributed around the audiences to enable them to take part in the event as well as a whole room full of futuristic artistic installations and an entrance piece designed by Tony Coleman and created by Paul Kent in which audience members were interrogated by a virtual "Big Sister" entity.

Performances also included tribal fusion belly dance from Khalgani and an audio/visual/dance piece with choreography from Lisa Natasha Wetton and music from Rich Batsford. Images devised by VJ Chromatouch were projected onto two dancers wearing white who had been led to a captive space by cyborg ushers in a scene inspired by Science Fiction film THX 1138.

The Metro newspaper described the event as "an avant-garde attack on a reality TV society". A video was created featuring a number of performances from the event.

=== Xhibition ===
The final Project X Presents event, on 9 May 2009, saw an emphasis on an exhibition of fine art featuring work from Mandy Kasafir, Nisha Grover, Gabriella Gardosi, Matt Robinson, cartoonist Hunt Emerson and a number of Project X regulars. A programme of acoustic music in St Mary’s Church featured Chris Tye, whilst a longer more varied evening of performance upstairs at The Cross featured ska-punk from The Cracked Actors, the Moksha Medicine Men featuring Rohit Ballal on sitar, a set from DJ Marc Reck and an uncredited appearance from comedian John Gordillo.

Some of the events took place outdoors including a mobile projection unit powered by a car battery and mounted on a wheelchair which was created by Liam d’Authreau (Blend) and operated by Paul Kent and Charlie Machin.

Hunt Emerson designed the poster for the event depicting Moseley as the centre of the universe after a cartoon by Saul Steinburg which first appeared on the cover of The New Yorker.

The event also included the premiere of Music is not Pollution, a short film produced by Project X in response to a situation in which several venues which supported the live music scene in Birmingham were facing threat of closure due to complaints from nearby residents and another in which Lyndall Kay interviewed "Pete the Feet", a local Moseley character.
