= Hall Green railway station =

Railway station in the West Midlands, England

Coordinates: 52.437°N 1.845°W

Hall Green
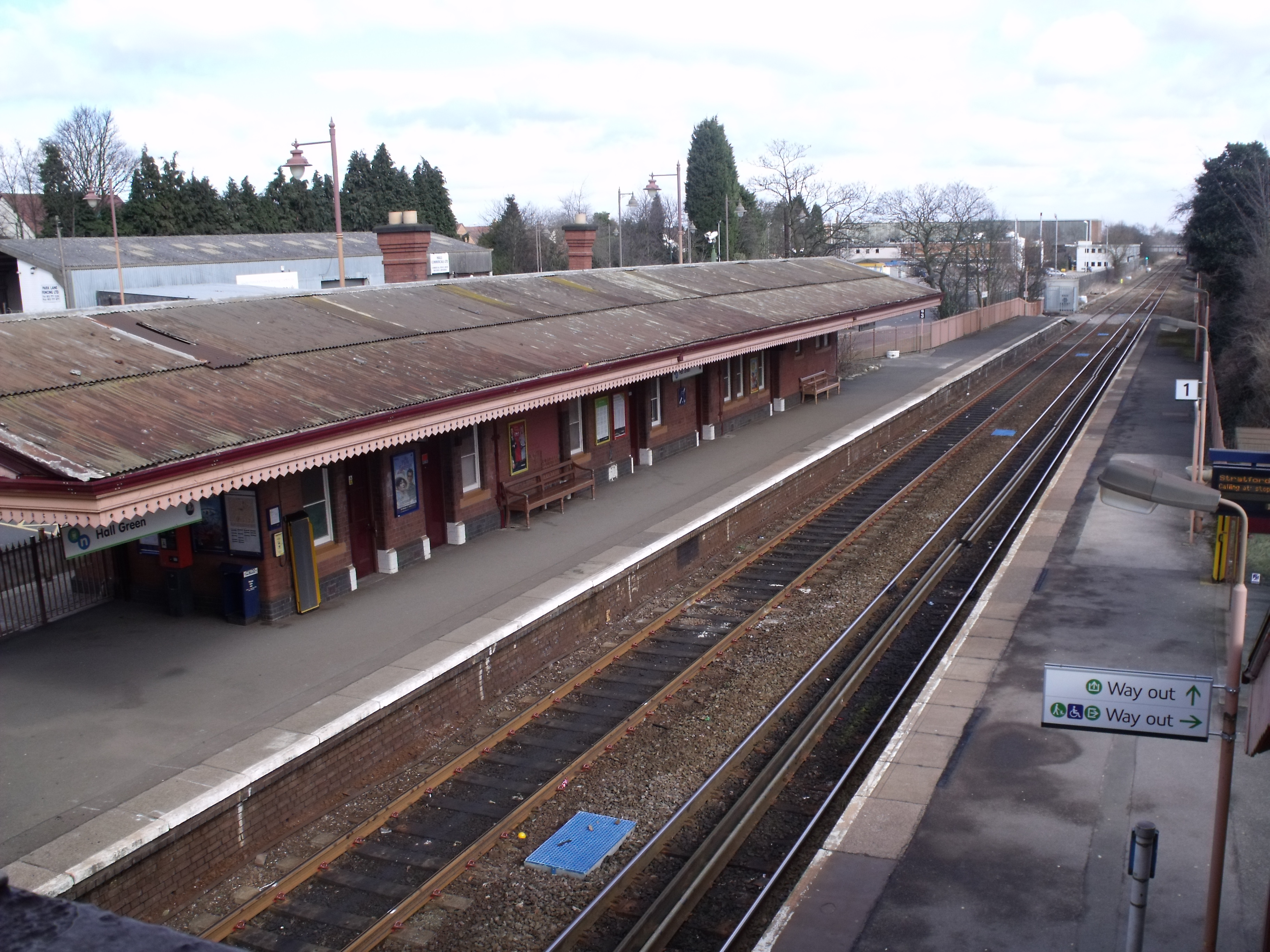
- Hall Green railway station.

General information
- Location: Hall Green, Birmingham; England
- Grid reference: SP106821
- Manager: West Midlands Trains
- Transit authority: Transport for West Midlands
- Platforms: 2

Other information
- Station code: HLG
- Fare zone: 3
- Classification: DfT category E

History
- Opened: 1908

Passengers
- 2021/22: ▲0.218 million
- 2022/23: ▲0.262 million
- 2023/24: ▲0.302 million
- 2024/25: ▲0.339 million
- 2025/26: ▲0.383 million
Location
Notes
- Passenger statistics from the Office of Rail and Road

Hall Green railway station serves the Hall Green area of Birmingham in the West Midlands of England. The station, and all trains serving it, are operated by West Midlands Trains.

== History ==
The station was opened by the Great Western Railway on 9 December 1908, on the North Warwickshire Line which had opened a few months earlier. The station was originally provided with extensive goods facilities, but these were closed in 1969, and the area now forms part of the station car park.

== Services ==
During Monday to Saturday daytimes:

- 2 trains per hour run westbound to Kidderminster via Birmingham Moor Street, Birmingham Snow Hill, Smethwick Galton Bridge and Stourbridge Junction, with some evening services continuing onward to Worcester.
- 2 trains per hour run southbound to Whitlocks End via Shirley, one of which continues to Stratford-upon-Avon.

On Sundays, there is an hourly service in each direction, running westbound to Worcester via Birmingham and eastbound to Stratford-upon-Avon via Whitlocks End that calls.

Preceding station	National Rail	Following station
Spring Road	West Midlands Railway; North Warwickshire Line; Snow Hill lines	Yardley Wood
