= Yardley Wood railway station =

Railway station in the West Midlands, England

Yardley Wood
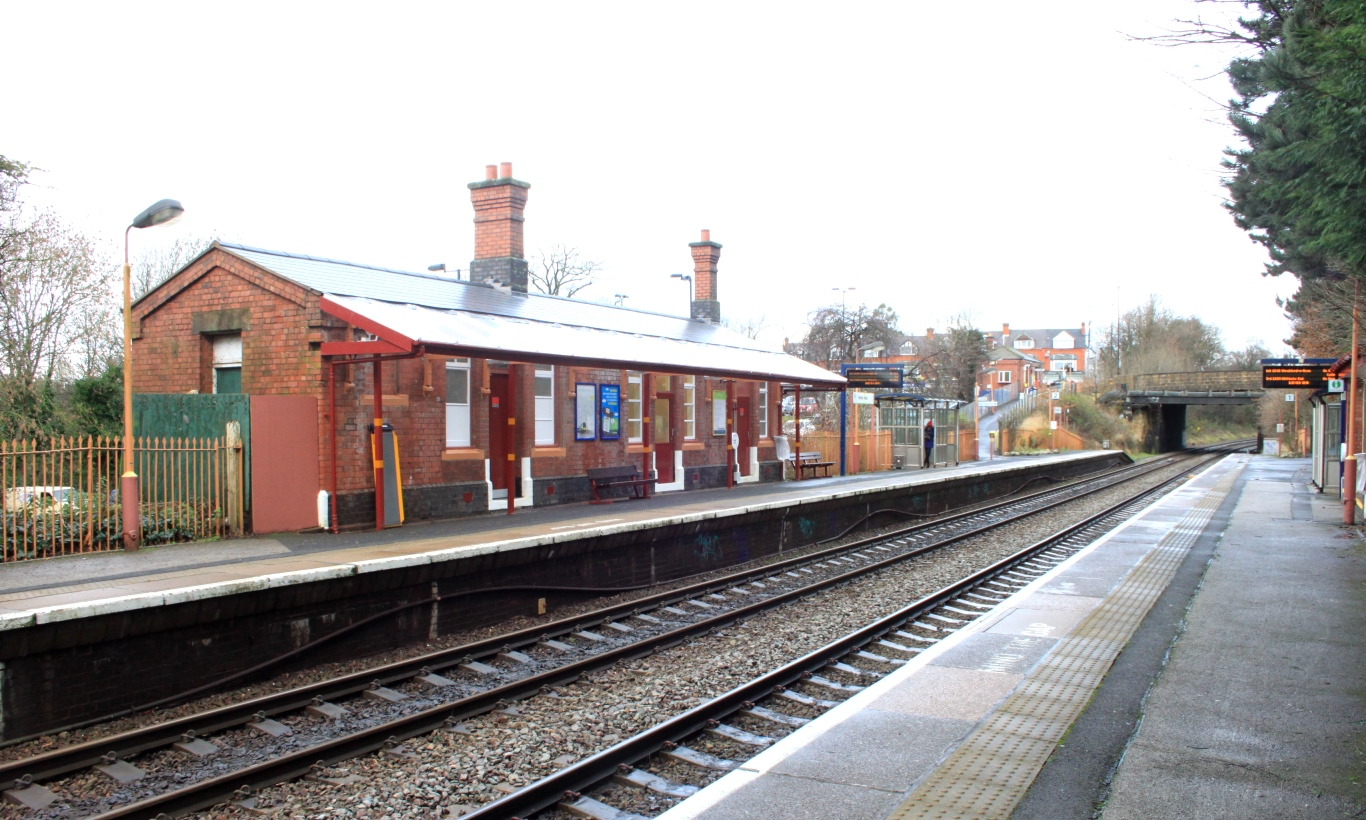

General information
- Location: Yardley Wood, Birmingham; England
- Coordinates: 52.421336°N 1.854740°W
- Manager: West Midlands Trains
- Transit authority: Transport for West Midlands
- Platforms: 2

Other information
- Station code: YRD
- Fare zone: 3
- Classification: DfT category E

History
- Opened: 1908

Passengers
- 2021/22: ▲0.255 million
- 2022/23: ▲0.302 million
- 2023/24: ▲0.352 million
- 2024/25: ▲0.409 million
- 2025/26: ▲0.459 million
Location
Notes
- Passenger statistics from the Office of Rail and Road

Yardley Wood railway station serves the Yardley Wood area of Birmingham in the West Midlands of England. Located on the North Warwickshire Line, the station, and all trains serving it, are operated by West Midlands Trains.

The station platforms are accessed by ramps from Highfield Road, which crosses over the railway on a bridge just north of the station. The ticket office is located at road level, adjacent to the bridge.

== History ==
The station was opened by the Great Western Railway (GWR) on 1 July 1908, along with the line, and was originally known as Yardley Wood Platform.... Platform being a GWR term for a station which was intermediate between a halt and a station in importance and facilities; the suffix was later dropped. Unlike the previous and following stations on the line (Shirley and Hall Green) Yardley Wood was never provided with goods facilities. Most of the original station buildings are still intact.

The station staff houses for the Station Master and Sub-Station Master, built on Highfield Road by GWR in 1907, were in use until around the late 1970s but were sold off as private houses shortly after this time. They still stand next to the station on Highfield Road

== Services ==
During Monday to Saturday daytimes, from December 2025:

- 2 trains per hour northbound to Birmingham Moor Street and Birmingham Snow Hill continuing to Stourbridge Junction, with some trains continuing onward to Kidderminster and Worcester.
- 2 trains per hour southbound to Whitlocks End, one of which continues to Stratford-upon-Avon.

On Sundays, there is an hourly train between Worcester, Birmingham, Shirley and Stratford-upon-Avon.

| Preceding station | National Rail | Following station |
|---|---|---|
| Hall Green | West Midlands Railway; North Warwickshire Line | Shirley |
