= Ninestiles, an Academy =

Location
- Hartfield Crescent; Birmingham, West Midlands, B27 7QG; England; 52.4393°N 1.8323°W

Information
- Type: Academy
- Motto: Le Carpe Diem
- Established: 1864
- Founder: Roy Taylor
- Closed: 2026
- Local authority: Birmingham
- Department for Education URN: 136406 Tables
- Ofsted: Reports
- Head teacher: Alex Jenkins
- Staff: 150+
- Gender: Co-educational
- Age: 11 to 16
- Enrolment: 1496
- Colours: White polo shirt & black Jumper with logo. Black trousers/skirt. White shirt, Ninestiles tie & black blazer with logo.
- Website: http://www.ninestiles.org.uk/

Ninestiles, an Academy is a secondary school with academy status in Acocks Green, Birmingham, England. It is a mixed comprehensive academy with nearly 1,500 students. Ninestiles was formed out of a merger between Hartfield Crescent and Pitmaston School in 1984. The merger saw the combined school renamed to Ninestiles School. The name referenced a path that closely ran between the two sites and had nine stiles. After two years on both sites, the school merged into a single site on Hartfield Crescent. There had been a school there since 1929 when Hartfield Crescent Council School was founded. In 1986 Fox Hollies Leisure Centre opened adjacent to the school, with pupils having access to the facilities.

In 2025, the school won 'Inclusive School of the Year at the Tes School Awards, and was shortlisted for the Education Awards' 'Secondary School of the Year' award.

== Structure ==
In 2005, the school changed the length of its lessons to two and a half hours apiece. This, five years later was changed to one hour forty minutes to allow students to cope better with the lesson being shorter, therefore this would also make it easier for teachers not having to plan lessons as long. The change required some adaptation on the part of the school's faculty, including rotating subjects and planning extended trips. In 2016 the length of lessons were changed to one hour and fifteen minutes, allowing for there to be four lessons and for it to be easier for teachers to plan lessons.

== Ofsted report ==
An Ofsted inspection of Ninestiles in December 2019, judged the school to be 'good' in overall effectiveness. It also judged the quality of education, behaviour and attitudes, personal development and leadership and management to be 'good'.

== Controversy ==
In October 2018, Ninestiles Secondary School provoked concern after it announced that students would be banned from talking in designated "quiet" areas. News of the rule change was explained in a letter sent to parents. The letter explained that students would be required to remain silent while moving "to and from assembly, at lesson changeover and towards communal areas at break and lunch”.

This policy of silence between classes was reversed in 2020.
