= Alstom Aventra =

Family of electric passenger trains

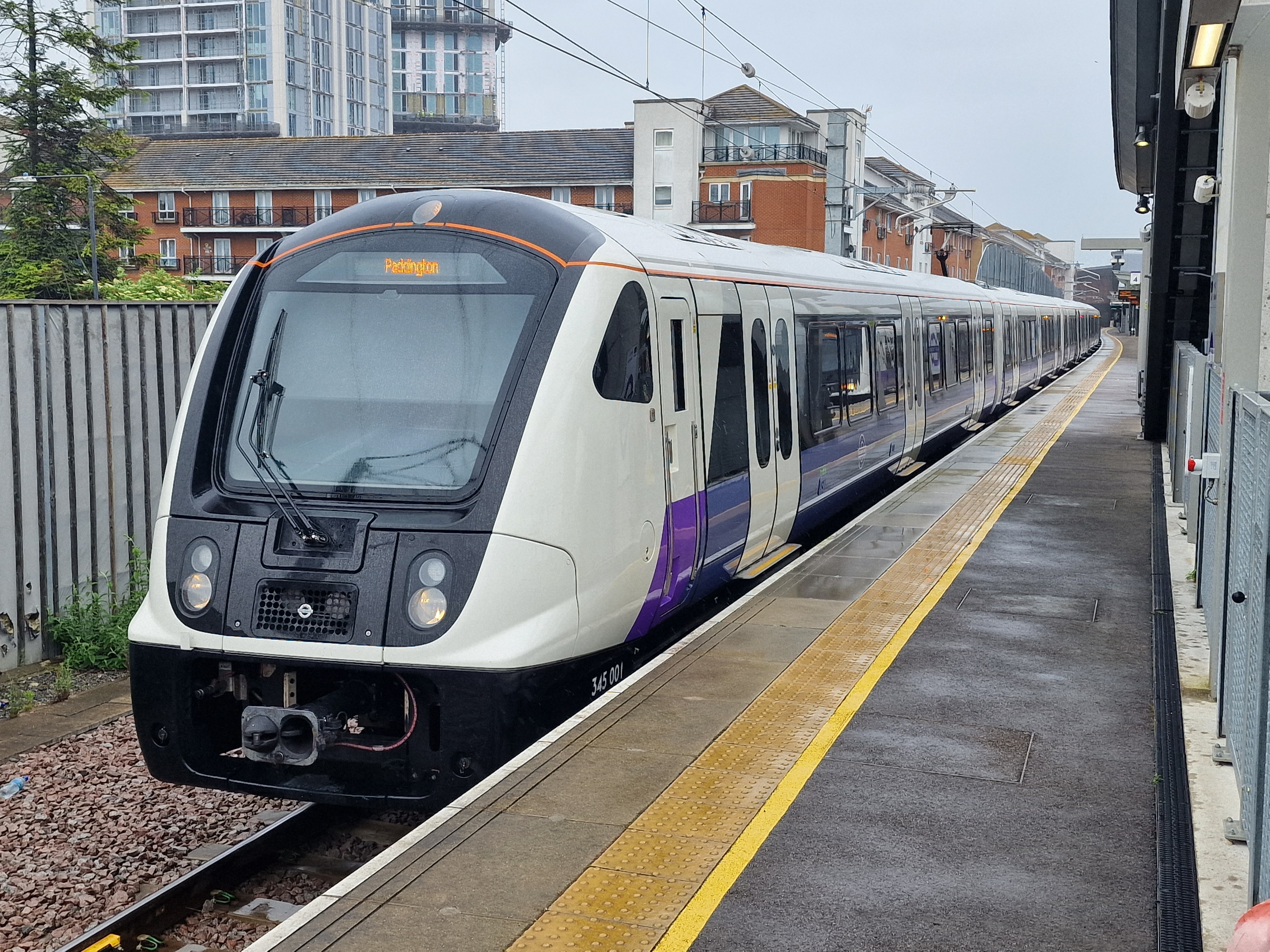
- An Elizabeth line Class 345 Aventra
- Manufacturer: Bombardier Transportation (2015–2021); Alstom (2021–present)
- Built at: Derby Litchurch Lane Works
- Replaced: Class 172; Class 315; Class 317; Class 319; Class 321; Class 322; Class 323; Class 350/2; Class 360; Class 379; Class 387; Class 455; Class 707
- Constructed: 2015–present
- Entered service: 22 June 2017
- Predecessor: Bombardier Electrostar
- Successor: Alstom Adessia
- Formation: 3 per set (730), 4 per set (710), 5 per set ( 701; 710; 720; 730 ), 9 per set (345), 10 per set (701)
- Operators: Elizabeth line, London Overground, Greater Anglia, South Western Railway, c2c, West Midlands Trains
- Depots: Ilford, Wimbledon, Willesden, East Ham, Old Oak Common, Soho, Bletchley, Bescot

Specifications
- Doors: Sliding plug (2 or 3 per side)
- Maximum speed: 75–110 mph (120–180 km/h)
- Weight: 30–35 t (30–34 long tons; 33–39 short tons) per car
- Electric system(s): 25 kV 50 Hz AC OHLE; 750 V DC third rail
- Current collection: Pantograph; Contact shoe
- Bogies: Flexx-Eco
- Braking system(s): Disc & regenerative
- Multiple working: Within individual classes
- Track gauge: 1,435 mm (4 ft 8 1/2 in) standard gauge

The Alstom Aventra (sold as the Bombardier Aventra until 2021) is a family of electric multiple unit (EMU) passenger trains produced at Derby Litchurch Lane Works in the United Kingdom, originally by Bombardier Transportation and later by Alstom, as a successor to the Bombardier Electrostar. A large proportion of its design is based on the Electrostar, adding new technologies and achieving compliance with more stringent requirements and operator demands.

Bombardier began developing the Aventra in 2009, based on feedback from train operating companies (TOCs) and upcoming regulation changes. It has been designed to provide a generic platform for conducting inter-regional, commuter, metro and high-speed passenger services. It has been claimed to be more efficient and flexible than the Electrostar, which was mainly achieved via the greater use of digital technology. The development of a bi-mode version of the Aventra, incorporating batteries, was proposed as a replacement for existing diesel multiple-units.

The first order for the Aventra came from the Crossrail programme in 2014. Numerous other operators have since ordered the type, including London Overground, Greater Anglia, South Western Railway, c2c and West Midlands Trains.

== Description ==
The Aventra was developed by Bombardier Transportation principally as a successor to their prolific Electrostar electric multiple unit (EMU) family; the final example of which was delivered during 2018 after nearly twenty years of continuous production. According to Niall Simmons, Bombardier's Head of Bids Engineering, development work on what would become the Aventra had begun as early as 2009, although its design had significantly evolved during this time in response to the feedback gathered from various train operating companies. The platform was to be made adaptable to serve various subsections of the passenger rail market, including inter-regional, commuter, metro and high-speed services. Furthermore, the introduction of increasingly stringent regulations had driven a need either to extensively redesign the Electrostar, or to develop a replacement family. Bombardier has reportedly invested in excess of £50 million into the development of the Aventra.

In comparison with the Electrostar, the Aventra has been designed to be lighter and more energy efficient, with greater flexibility. It has also been claimed to provide greater levels of comfort and reliability. Among the differences in the design are various measures to improve operational efficiency, including the adoption of wider gangways and doors to shorten station dwell times by speeding up passenger boarding; the gangway has reportedly been designed to allow better use of the interior space and ease of movement throughout the train. The Aventra features a redesigned interior, which Bombardier has indicated to be the main visual difference between the two platforms.

A major area of divergence between the two platforms is the greater use of digital technology on board the Aventra platform, partly in response to operators' requests, such as the train control management system. The platform also uses predictive maintenance instead of traditional prescriptive maintenance. Far more reporting information spanning more functionality is generated by the Aventra than on the previous Electrostar family. The signalling apparatus supports the European Rail Traffic Management System (ERTMS).

Structurally, the Aventra is relatively lightweight; the body of each carriage having been redeveloped from the Electrostar. It comprises various welded assemblies that attached to one another via bolts. The vehicle also incorporate the FlexxEco bogie, previously used in service on other Bombardier trainsets, such as the Voyager and some of the later-built Turbostars. While the older Electrostar family are not compliant with the Technical Standards of Interoperability (TSI) introduced in 2017, the Aventra was specifically designed for compliance with the more rigorous regulatory requirements.

During 2018, Bombardier promoted the prospective development of a bi-mode version of the Aventra, intended to be capable of speeds up to 125 mph (200 km/h). This bi-mode trainset, which would have incorporate batteries, positioned itself as a potential successor to several older diesel multiple-units, such as the Bombardier Turbostar and Bombardier Voyager platforms.

The primary manufacturing site for the Aventra was established at Bombardier's Derby Litchurch Lane Works facility; Simmons has stated that the Derby production line was intended to manufacture the type, not only to fulfil British orders but also those placed by overseas operators. Each operator can choose to customise the design of its Aventra fleet; common variations have included different vehicle lengths, modified propulsion systems, and interior changes. Much of the onboard equipment has been designed to be flexible and upgradable. Some customers, such as the London Overground, have intentionally stylised their Aventra's interiors to maintain a high degree of commonality with their existing Electrostar fleets.

In November 2021, Alstom signed a memorandum of understanding with Eversholt Rail Group to build 10 three-car hydrogen multiple units. These trains were not subsequently ordered.

== Orders ==
As of May 2024, a total of 2,651 vehicles have been built for six operators:

=== Elizabeth line ===
The first order for the Aventra platform was a £1 billion (including maintenance) contract for 65 Class 345 nine-car EMUs (with an option for 17 more) for the London Crossrail programme in February 2014, which built the Elizabeth line. The £1 billion figure included a new depot at Old Oak Common and a maintenance contract. These units are operated by Elizabeth line concession holder MTR Crossrail and have replaced Class 315, Class 360 and Class 387 on Shenfield Metro, Heathrow and Reading services respectively. The first train entered service in June 2017.

In July 2017, it was announced that the order would be increased to 70 trains; the contract for the additional trains was signed in March 2018.

In April 2024, with the future viability of the Derby Litchurch Lane manufacturing plant in serious doubt due to a lack of orders, a further follow-on order for ten additional trains was indicated (five previously agreed plus a further five trainsets) in response to strong growth of passenger numbers on the Elizabeth Line and future expected service increases to cope with the interchange with High Speed 2 services at Old Oak Common Interchange.

In June 2024, it was announced that the aforementioned ten more nine-car Class 345s had been ordered.

=== London Overground ===
London Overground ordered 54 four-car Class 710 trains in July 2015, with an option remaining for 15 more, similar to those being used for Crossrail. They have replaced Class 315, Class 317, Class 172 and Class 378 or the entire fleet in 2019 on Lea Valley, Gospel Oak and Watford DC lines and are operated by London Overground concession holder Arriva Rail London. These entered service in May 2019.

=== Greater Anglia ===
In August 2016, Greater Anglia was awarded the new East Anglia franchise, including an order with Bombardier for Class 720 units. 22 ten-car trains and 89 five-car trains were originally ordered (665 carriages). They replaced the Class 317, Class 321, Class 360 and Class 379s. Greater Anglia later amended the order with all to be built as five-car sets. These entered service in November 2020.

=== South Western Railway ===
On 20 June 2017, Bombardier was awarded a contract to build 750 cars for South Western Railway (SWR). The Class 701 units are into 30 five-car and 60 ten-car sets and replace SWR's 455 suburban fleet. On 9 January 2024, the first Class 701 unit entered revenue service after more than four years of delays.

=== West Midlands Trains ===
On 17 October 2017, Bombardier was selected to build a total of 84 Class 730 EMUs (324 carriages) for West Midlands Trains. These will be formed into two separate types: 48 three-car units and 36 five-car units. The three-car Class 730/0 sets in West Midlands Trains branding entered service on 13 November 2023. Class 730/0 are to be named after landmarks within the West Midlands. The five-car Class 730/2 sets in London Northwestern Railway branding entered service on 9 June 2025.

=== c2c ===
In December 2017, c2c ordered six ten-car Aventra units, which were proposed to enter service in summer 2021. These replaced the six, 4-car Class 387 units leased from 2016. In 2020, the order was amended to be for 12 five-car Class 720 trains instead, mirroring the change made by Greater Anglia to their order. These entered service in September 2023.

== Alstom Aventra variants ==
| Class | Operator | Introduced | Number | Power | Carriages | Carriage Length (m) | Door configuration | End gangways | Image |
|---|---|---|---|---|---|---|---|---|---|
| Class 345 | Elizabeth line | June 2017 | 70 | AC electric | 9 (7 from 2017) | 24 | Plug, 6 sets of doors per carriage | No | |
| Class 701 | South Western Railway | January 2024 | 30 | DC electric | 5 | 20 | Plug, 4 sets of doors per carriage | No | |
| Class 701 | South Western Railway | January 2024 | 60 | DC electric | 10 | 20 | Plug, 4 sets of doors per carriage | No | |
| Class 710 | London Overground | March 2020 | 31 | AC electric | 4 | 20 | Plug, 4 sets of doors per carriage | No | |
| Class 710 | London Overground | May 2019 | 18 | Dual voltage | 4 | 20 | Plug, 4 sets of doors per carriage | No | |
| Class 710 | London Overground | May 2019 | 6 | Dual voltage | 5 | 20 | Plug, 4 sets of doors per carriage | No | |
| Class 720 | c2c | September 2023 | 12 | AC electric | 5 | 24 | Plug, 4 sets of doors per carriage | No | |
| Class 720 | Greater Anglia | November 2020 | 133 | AC electric | 5 | 24 | Plug, 4 sets of doors per carriage | No | |
| Class 730 | West Midlands Trains | November 2023 | 48 | AC electric | 3 | 24 | Plug, 4 sets of doors per carriage | Yes | |
| Class 730 | West Midlands Trains | June 2025 | 36 | AC electric | 5 | 24 | Plug, 4 sets of doors per carriage | Yes | |

== See also ==
- CAF Civity
- Siemens Desiro
- Stadler FLIRT
