= Bletchley TMD =

Traction maintenance depot in the UK

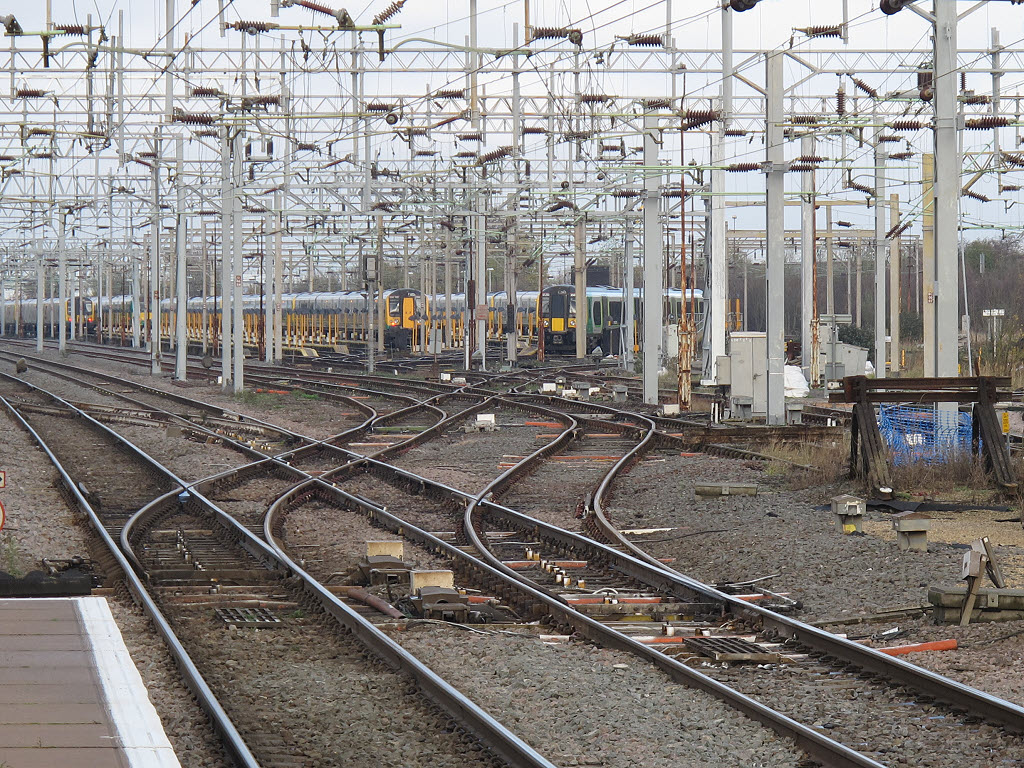
- Looking north from Bletchley station, the stabling sidings in the distance.
- Interactive map of Bletchley TMD

Location
- Location: Bletchley, Milton Keynes, United Kingdom
- Coordinates: 52.0008°N 0.7313°W
- OS grid: SP870344

Characteristics
- Owner: London Northwestern Railway
- Depot code: 2B (1948-1950); 4A (1950-1952); 1E (1952-1973); BY (1973-present)
- Type: Diesel, DMU, EMU

History
- Opened: 1850
- Original: London and North Western Railway
- Pre-grouping: London Midland Scottish Railway
- Post-grouping: British Rail

Bletchley TMD is a railway traction maintenance depot situated in Bletchley, Milton Keynes in Buckinghamshire, to the north east of Bletchley railway station, on a siding off the Marston Vale line. The depot is operated by West Midlands Trains (trading as London Northwestern Railway).

== History ==
The original London and North Western Railway locomotive shed in Bletchley was a wooden and galvanised iron building that catered for some twelve engines, with three roads accommodated within the facility. However during the 1870s the shed collapsed in a gale, burying stabled locomotives and was replaced by two gabled roof spans with numerous ducts and chimneys. When newly rebuilt, it would measure 250 feet (76 m) in length, with a maximum width of 100 feet (30 m). These sheds were situated just north of the railway station on a siding to the west side of the West Coast Main Line, on a site now occupied by today's carpark.

Towards the end of the 19th century, a number of LNWR Lady of the Lake Class steam locomotives were employed as pilot engines, with ‘Bletchley Shed’ as their home depot – by then considered an intermediate Loco Shed. The end of British Rail steam in Bletchley came on Monday, 5 July 1965 when 24 steam engines stabled in the Locomotive Shed departed for other parts of the country, the last one taking the 2pm parcels train to Oxford. This was locomotive No. 48610 LMS Stanier Class 8F 2-8-0, which had been stabled at Bletchley for ten years. With the end of steam, the TMD was relocated to the Bedford side of the Bletchley Flyover, in a new purpose built facility.

== Present ==
Bletchley TMD began in the modern era on its new site in 1965. It closed on 30 June 2008 and its (expired) lease returned to Network Rail. Bletchley had won awards for the reliability of its trains as recently as March 2007, and was said to deliver six times better than average reliability. London Midland phased in the fleet of 37 Class 350/2 Desiro trains, which are maintained by Siemens at the Kings Heath Depot in Northampton. These replaced the Silverlink Class 321 fleet which had been serviced at Bletchley. Most of the engineers & technicians transferred to the Siemens site and the cleaners to London Midland. Local press expressed concern that maintenance of the trains being used on the Marston Vale Line was being transferred to Tyseley TMD in Birmingham, with consequent long delays to service resumption in the event of train failure.

Bletchley depot was bought back into use by Vivarail in September 2018 to maintain its Class 230 diesel units. These were used exclusively on the Marston Vale Line until the company failed and the trains were withdrawn in December 2022.

In July 2023, three British Rail Class 150 were transferred to Bletchley TMD, in preparation for their introduction to service on the Marston Vale Line. to replace the Class 230s.

In April 2024, West Midlands Trains announced that it had placed a £66M contract to upgrade the depot. When completed in autumn 2025, Bletchley TMD will "become the principal maintenance base for WMT’s newly procured Class 730 Aventra fleet". Following the (£80M) upgrade work, the depot reopened in September 2025. In addition to the British Rail Class 730/2 trains, the depot will also service the British Rail Class 150 diesel trains currently used on the Bletchley–Bedford Marston Vale line (and, prospectively, the Oxford–Milton Keynes Central East West Rail trains when that service begins).

== Bletchley West TMD ==
In late January 2026, the East West Rail Company announced that it proposes to establish a new TMD at a site that it calls "Bletchley West". The location for the site seems to be that of the former Swanbourne sidings. (Note: near grid reference SP830317, The site shown is in Newton Longville CP and not in West Bletchley CP nor Swanbourne CP.) What effect, if any, that this will have on the existing TMD, is not stated.

== See also ==
- List of British Railways shed codes
