= Horwood House =

Country house in Little Horwood, Buckinghamshire, England

Coordinates: 51.9586°N 0.8426°W

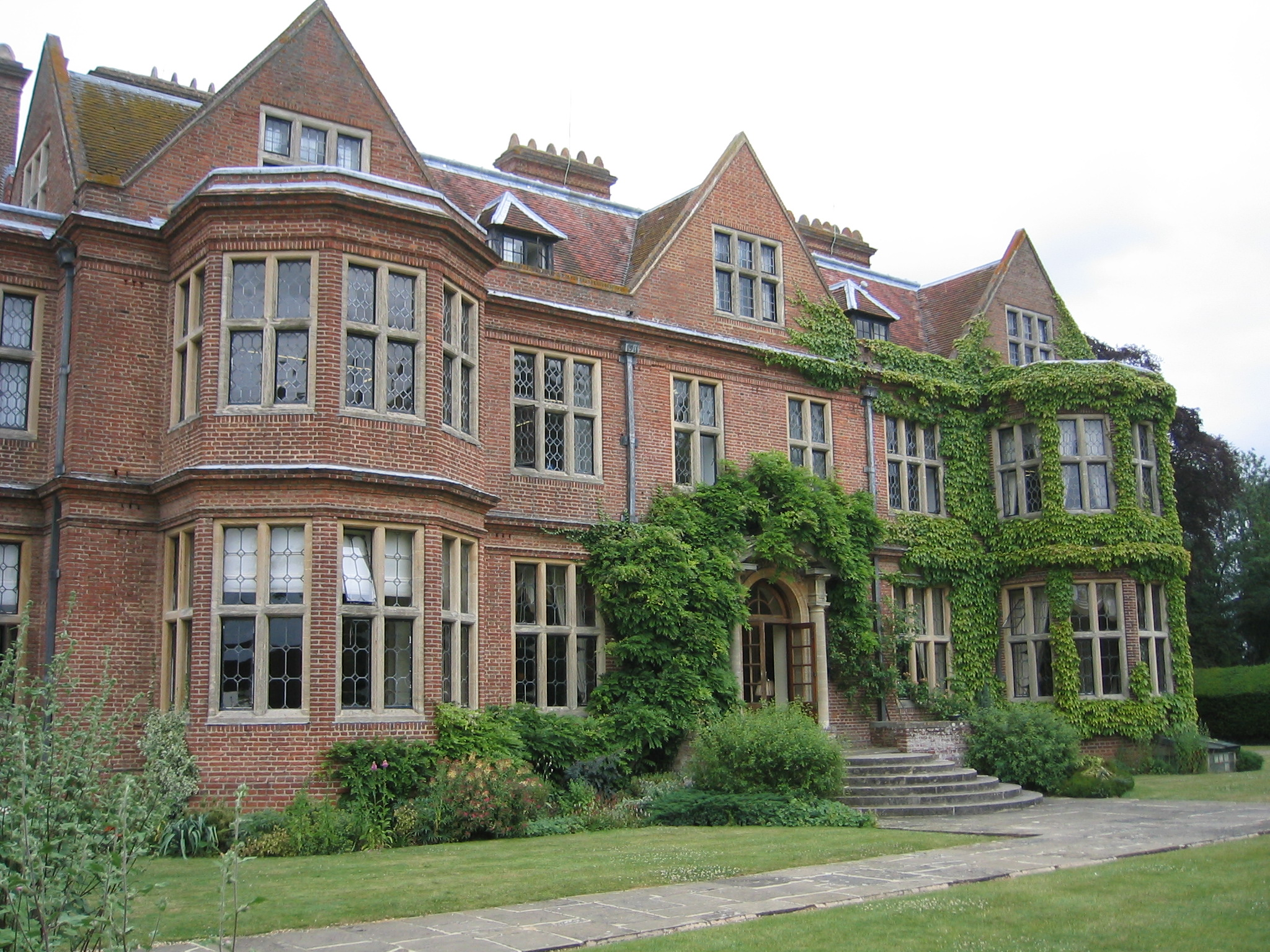
Horwood House – The rear of the House

Horwood House lies 0.5-mile (0.80 km) south east of the village of Little Horwood in Buckinghamshire. This Grade II listed building mansion is a comparatively modern house, built in 1911, the date being embossed into the gutter hopper-heads. Today it is a hotel and conference venue, owned and operated by ZIZ Properties Ltd.

== History ==
Horwood House – In the days when it was owned by the Denny Family and before being extended by the GPO. The orchard to the left of the stables provided apples for the house for 9 months of the year, by growing selective varieties

It was built for Frederick Arthur Denny (who had made his fortune in pork and bacon) and designed in a refined Jacobean style by the architects Blow and Billerey. It is built on the site of the former Old Horwood, a 300-year-old farmhouse previously known as Rectory House. Old Horwood was a building of late sixteenth-century construction, consisting of two storeys and an attic, with walls of timber and brick, which a Colonel Daucy occupied for a period and local folklore suggests that his ghost haunts the present house. It was extended in the later seventeenth century, and enlarged in the nineteenth century. When the estate was purchased by Denny it consisted of 482 acres (1.95 km^{2}), two farms, eleven cottages, the village hall, parkland and woods. The purchase of the estate made the owner the Lay Rector or patron of St Nicholas' church, Little Horwood. (In the Church of England, the legal right to appoint or recommend a parish priest is called an advowson, and its possessor is known as a patron.)

Horwood House – Another view during the Denny occupation

The construction of the house was contracted to the high-class builders Holland, Hannen & Cubitts. The brief given by Frederick Denny was that the house should be reasonably imposing but compact enough to be comfortable and it was supposed to be a copy of a house that he had seen in the West Country. The house had fourteen bedrooms, five bathrooms and there were nine servants' bedrooms in the West wing of the house, which adjoined the Norfolk-thatched stable yard, in which were housed eight top-class hunters. The thatch was laid by the brothers Farnham, famous thatchers of Rockland St. Mary. The horses were kept as it was the Denny's main sport and even the son and daughters took part. The house is of old russety bricks, which were imported from the Netherlands and old tiles were used for the gabled roof giving an appearance of a much older building than it was. It is believed that some fireplaces and wood-work too were recovered from other houses. At the rear of the house is a ha-ha which allows a panoramic view from the house but keeps out grazing cattle and wildlife. The house is symmetrical in layout and was featured in Country Life (10 November 1923); the article approved of the house, even though neither Mr. nor Mrs. Denny were in residence.

Horwood House – The original ground floor building plan

== Family home ==
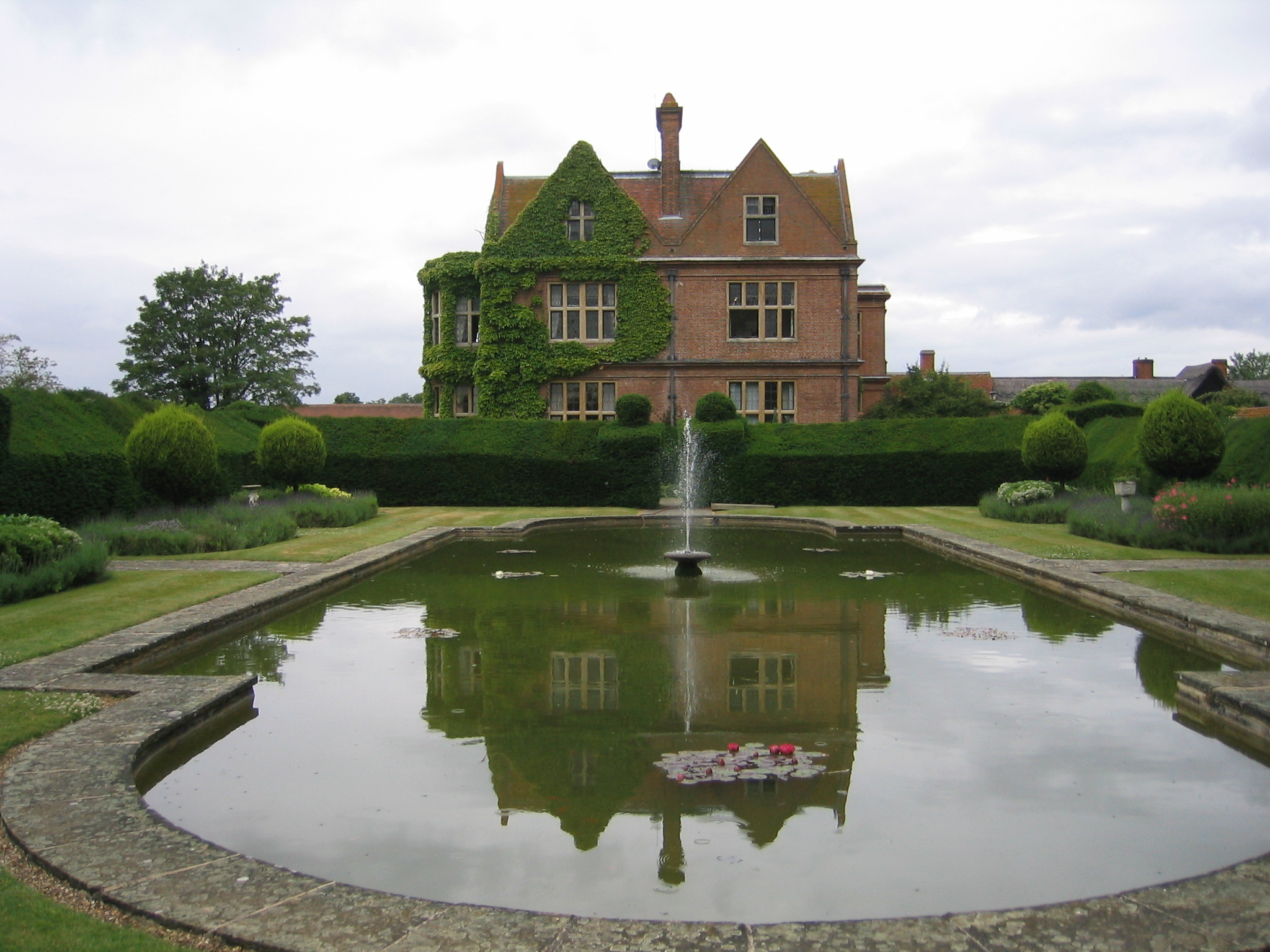
Horwood House – The "etang" was built on the site of Rectory cottage and fed from a natural spring

This was the Dennys' country residence as they had a house in London in Down Street, opposite Green Park, and another in Grosvenor Street, and the company headquarters were in Lambeth. The Denny family would travel down on Friday and back to London on the Monday. To start with they used the train travelling from Euston and changing at Bletchley on to the Varsity Line (Oxford and Cambridge Line) and arrived at Swanbourne station after just one stop, Swanborne station was just half a mile from the house and bordered on the estate. In the 1920s they employed three chauffeurs and four cars at Horwood. The cars were housed in the stable block, along with the hunters and other horses, and attached were three rooms for the chauffeurs. Within the thatched stable block was a house for the head groom and rooms for the stable boys. In total, Horwood House had a staff of some fifty people, including a butler, footman, lead parlour maid, assistant parlour maid, cook, kitchen maid, three under maids, between maid, two ladies maids, chauffeurs, electrician, farm bailiff and all the farm staff. There was a bothy next to the head gardener's house that housed five improver gardeners.

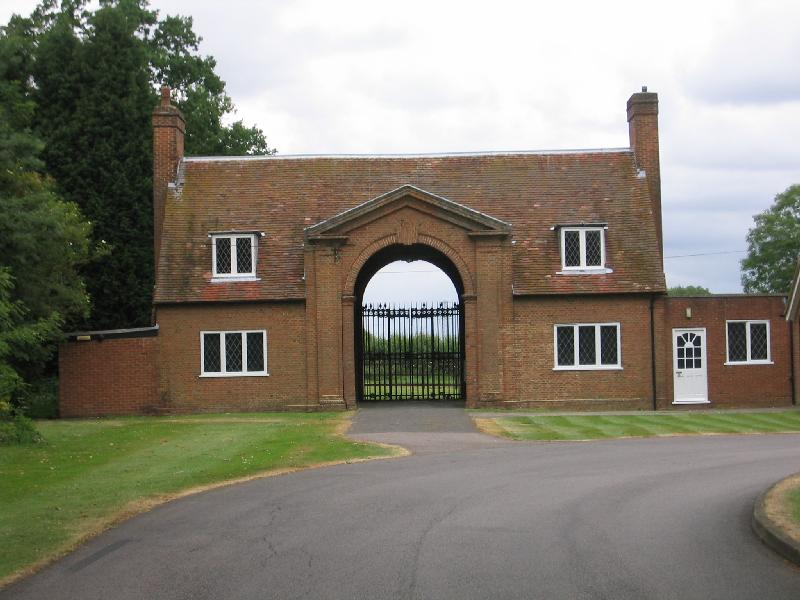
Horwood House – The gatehouse looking from the house

Frederick Denny married Maude Marion Quilter (born about 1868) of Bawdsey Manor and daughter of Sir William Cuthbert Quilter, 1st Bt. in 1888. There was a huge party for the Dennys' Golden Wedding celebrations in 1938, and there were over 200 guests. The Denny family owned much of Little Horwood, but the whole estate was auctioned off when they left in the 1940s. The details of the auction can still be seen at the house.

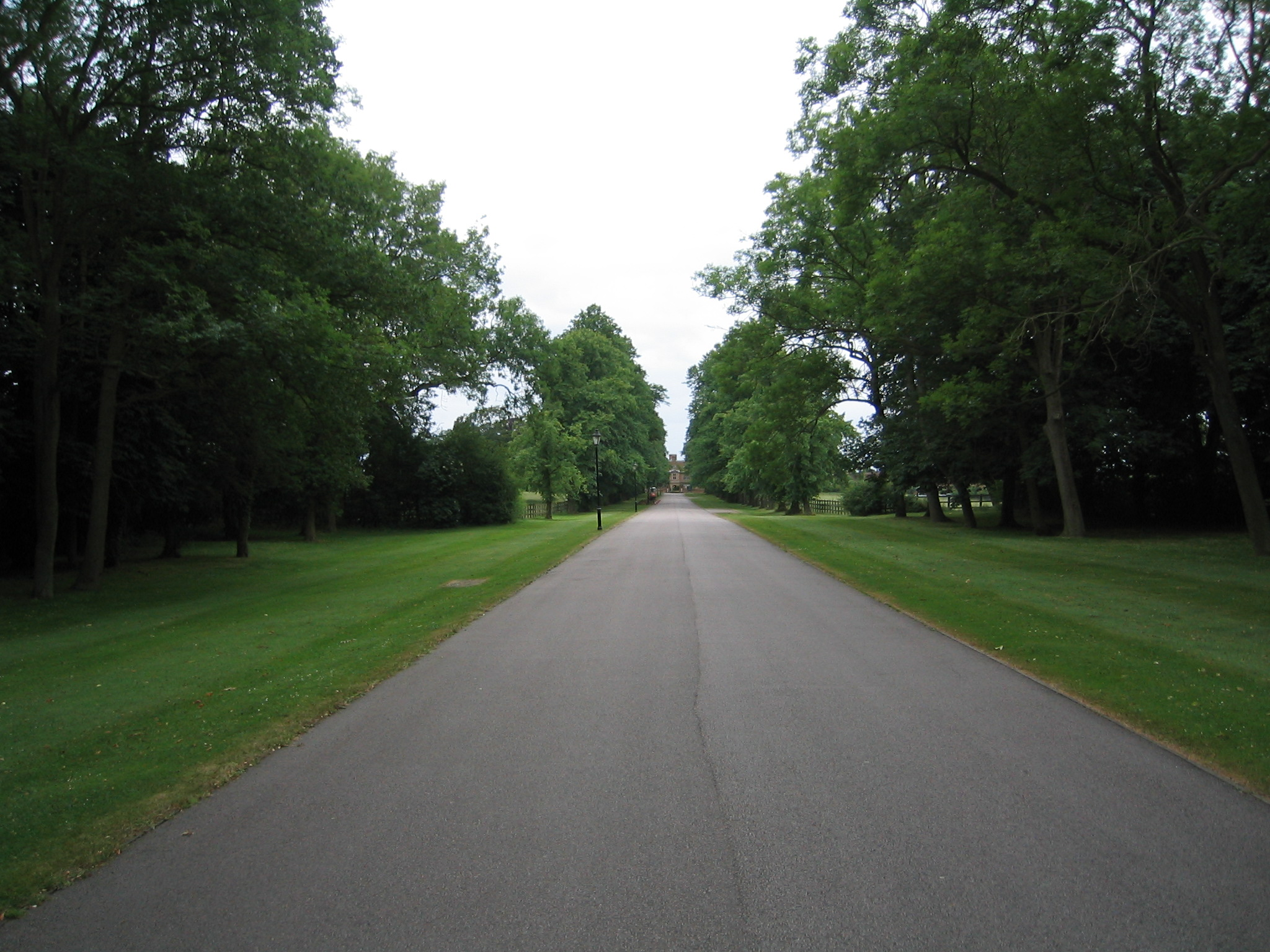
Horwood House – Looking down the 1/4 mile drive from the gate house to the house

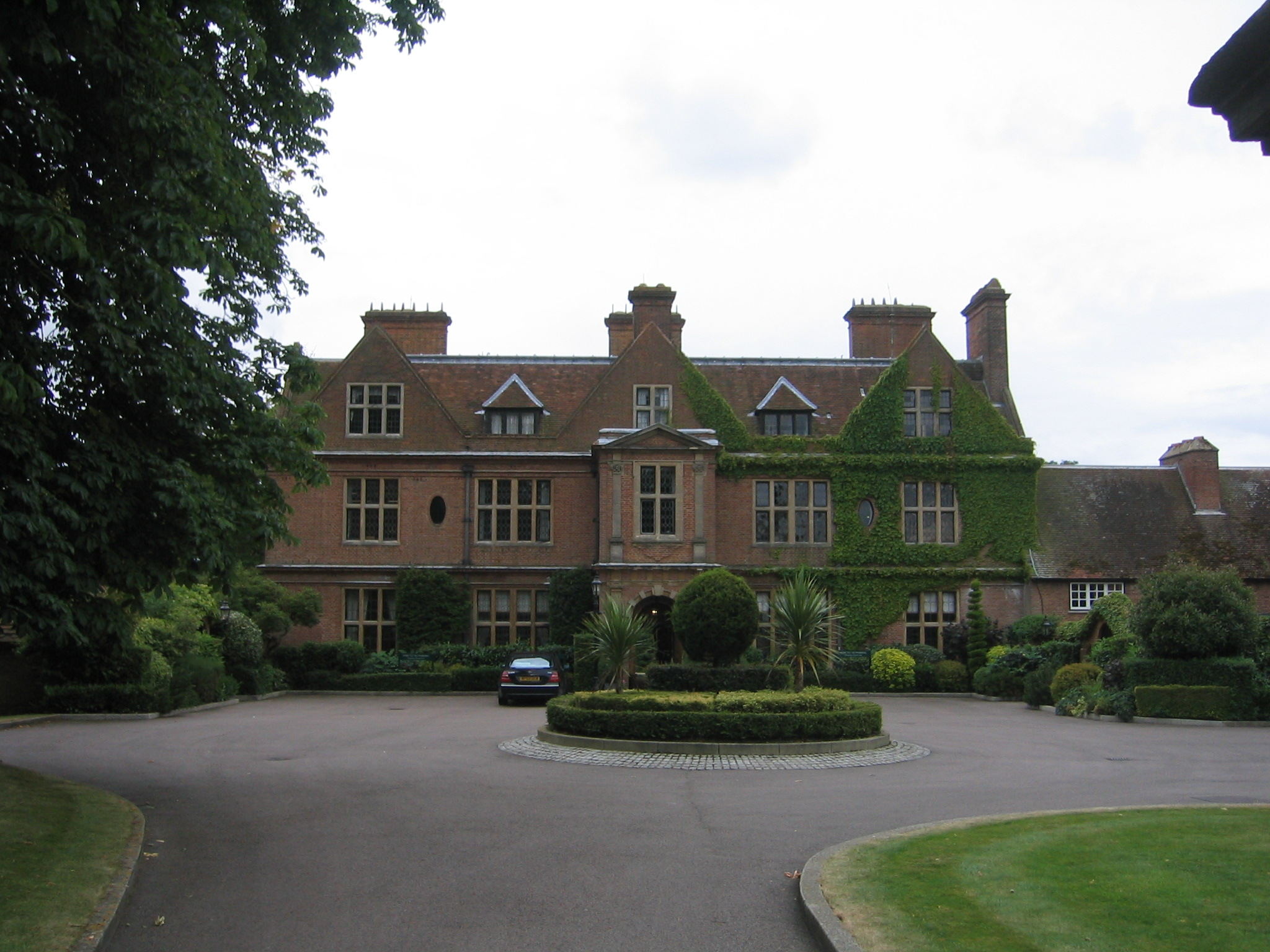
Horwood House – The front of the house

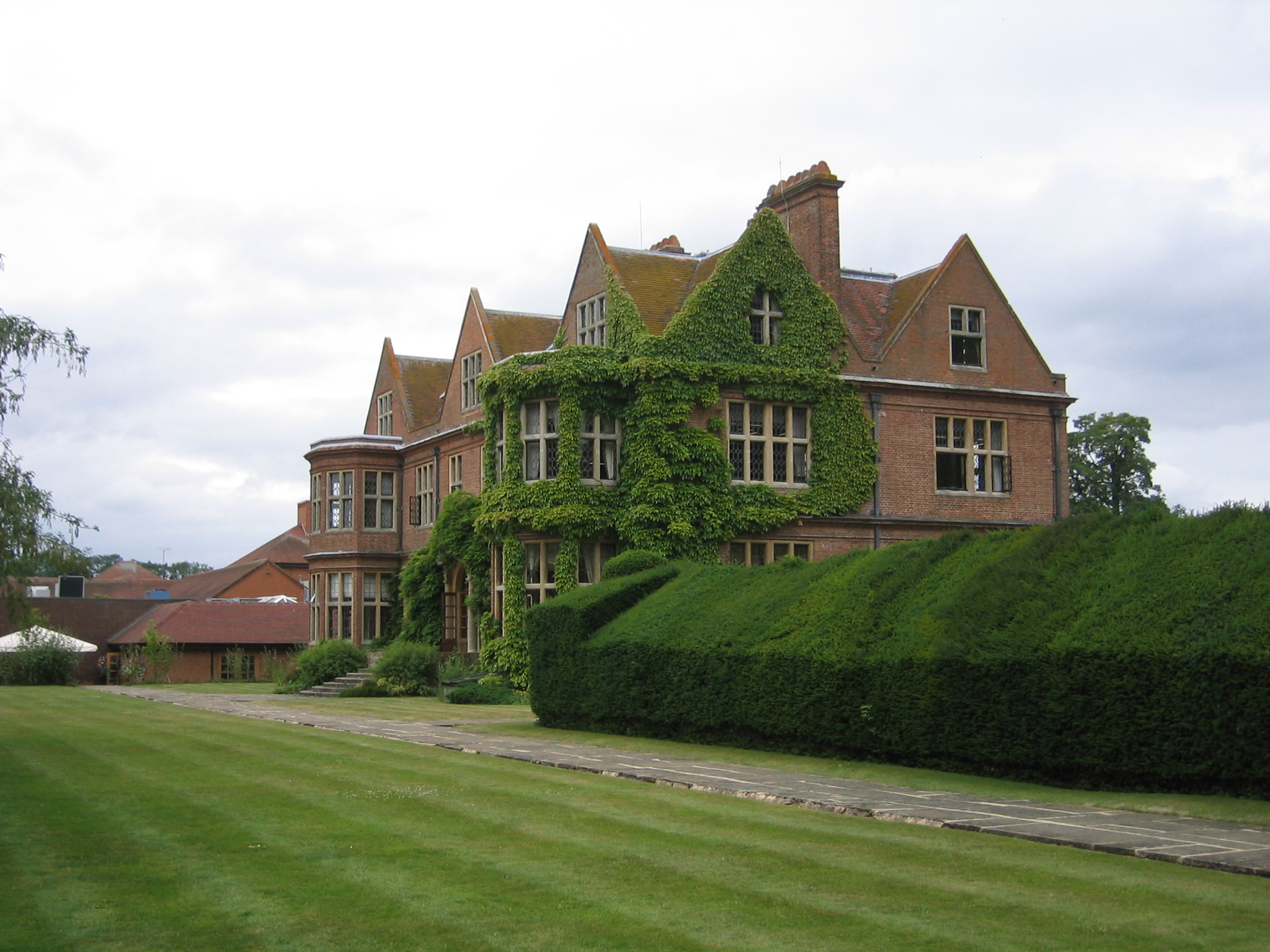
Horwood House – View of the east side of the house. The main bedrooms were in this part of the house on the upper floor

The grounds were approached through an arched gatehouse, but this has now been by-passed for easier access. Then there is a quarter of a mile straight drive to the main house. The drive is lined with lime trees, which were planted by the head gardener, Harry Thrower. The estate generated its own electricity before being connected to the national grid. The Dennys even had their own pet-cemetery where pets were laid to rest in small replicas of human graves complete with headstones engraved with the pet's name, which can be seen to this present day. The Dennys held a servants' ball each year; when the house was thrown open, and free drink, food and music were provided. They also gave a Christmas party for the children of the village and the servants.

=== Gardens ===
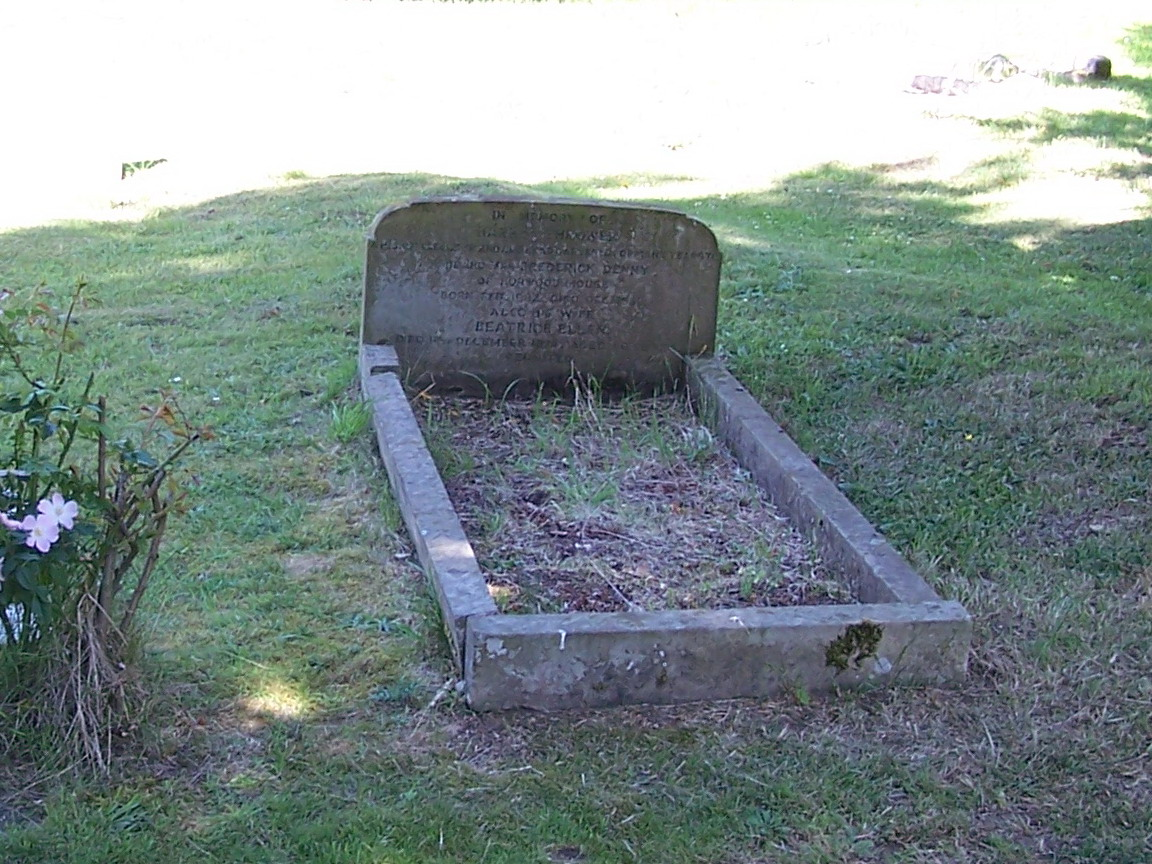
The grave stone of Harry Thrower in St Nicholas Church Little Horwood – Head gardener at Horwood House

The grave stone inscription of Harry Thrower – Head gardener at Horwood House

Horwood House was the birthplace of Percy Thrower (born 30 January 1913) whose father Harry Thrower (born 1882 in Felixstowe) was the head gardener when the house was built. There was a gardening staff of sixteen, and the position of head gardener came with a six-roomed cottage next to the vegetable garden, which was about 2 acres (0.81 ha) and enclosed by a 10-foot-high (3.0 m) brick wall. The wage for the head gardener was £2 per week, plus the cottage, heating, free fruit and vegetables, free milk and miscellaneous perks. The wages for an ordinary gardener were 28 shillings per week. There were lean-to greenhouses heated by a coal boiler via water pipes. There was an extensive apple orchard of nearly two hundred trees, which was able to provide apples all year apart from a few summer weeks. The head gardener was also required to provide exotic fruits at the time, such as peaches, melons, grapes etc. He was also required to produce mushrooms. The beehives were also the responsibility of Harry. When Percy was born in the cottage he was the first child to be born at Horwood House. Harry was previously a gardener at Bawdsey Manor, which was Maude Denny's family home. Percy started work as a “pot-and-crock” boy at Horwood in the spring of 1927, even though the house didn't really need one, but it never occurred to either Frederick Denny or Harry Thrower not to employ him. In fact all Percy's siblings were employed on the estate at the start of their working life. Percy received a shilling (5p) for an 11-hour day and worked a five-and-a-half-day week. He was able to supplement his income by catching wildlife; the estate paid 6d each for moles, magpies and carrion crows, and sometimes he would earn more from this than his wages. Percy left Horwood in 1931 to work in the royal gardens at Windsor, where there was a staff of sixty gardeners. Mrs Denny was so impressed that he was going to work at Windsor that she instructed one of the chauffeurs to drive Percy and his father there. By 1931 the number of gardeners at Horwood had been reduced from nineteen to seven, and Harry struggled to keep the garden up to scratch. Whilst BT had Horwood House, as their management college, the number was down to two, but they had the advantage of mechanisation. Harry Thrower died suddenly on 31 December 1939, when he was 57, from haemorrhage of the lungs brought on by smoking an ounce of pipe tobacco a day, and the effort of keeping the gardens up to standard with the three remaining gardeners. He was buried at St Nicholas' church in Little Horwood, with the inscription on his tombstone of “Highly valued friend and head gardener for many years to Mr. & Mrs. Denny of Horwood House”. Mrs. Harry Thrower was left a widow for 35 years. At first she worked in the house as a housekeeper, but later she ran a shop in Little Horwood, only retiring in 1971 because she refused to adopt decimalisation. She died in 1974.

During World War II a girls' school from the Isle of Wight was evacuated to Horwood House, and the Dennys moved out to The Laundry in Little Horwood, which, despite the name, was almost like a small mansion. Some of the internal staff went with them, including Percy Thrower's mother.

Frederick Denny died on 18 January 1941, and his son John Anthony Denny (married Selby Loundes) died on 19 May 1942 from pneumonia. There are stained glass windows in St Nicholas' church dedicated by Maude Denny in 1946 in memory of her husband and son. Maude Denny died on 19 October 1949.

There were other children. A daughter, Evelyn Elvira Denny, married Sir Everard Philip Digby Pauncefort-Duncombe, 3rd Bt.(born on 6 December 1885) on 16 November 1922. Another daughter Dora Maude Denny was born in 1891 and married Robert Nichols (1893–1944), and finally there was the third daughter, Rosalind Denny.

== The Old Ride School ==
Horwood House – In the days of The Old Ride School showing Nigel Pegram, the actor, in 1949 on the steps at the rear of the house

The house has had various roles since the original owners departed after only a generation of occupancy. The estate was broken up in 1936 when it was sold by the Denny Family. The estate was auctioned off by the firm of Hampton & Sons of London on Monday 16 November 1936 at the Bell Hotel, Winslow, Buckinghamshire. However many of the lots failed to reach their reserve but Mr Denny accepted offers on some of the lots on 18 November at the auctioneer's office at 6 Arlington Street, St James, London. The auction and the later offers raised a total of £29,755 which included the house and grounds at £20,000 although some lots were withdrawn. It is known from the auction details that the Horwood House telephone number, at the time was Winslow 26.

It then became a girls' school and later a boys' prep school called The Old Ride School after which, in 1962, it was bought by British Rail, as they were going to build a huge marshalling yard at Swanbourne which would encompass the Horwood House site, but this never happened due to the Beeching cuts, even though the Bletchley Flyover which opened in 1959, to carry the Varsity line, had been built at Bletchley for its use.

== College ==
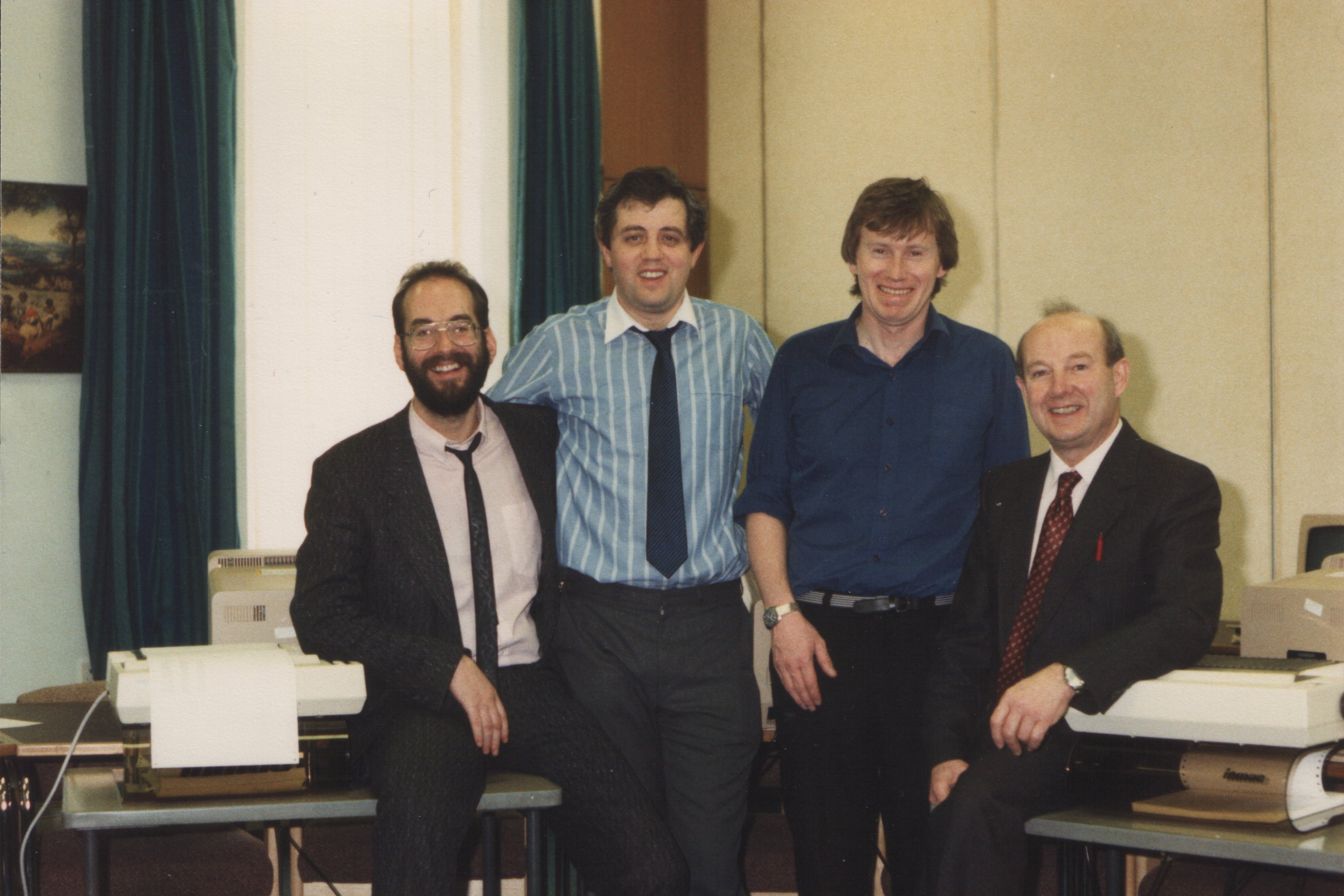
Horwood House – Taken just prior to the start of a four-day training course for BT managers in room G46. L-R the late Bob Roberts, Dave Atkins, Dave Atkinson and Stan Holt. Stan Holt and Dave Atkins were running the course the others kindly helped setting up. Taken around 1989

In 1966 BR sold Horwood House to the GPO who used it as one of their College of Engineering Studies. They built an extra accommodation wings, considerably enlarging the house which was completed in 1975.

In 1984 Horwood House became a Grade II listed building. BT (previously the GPO) further upgraded the building and increased the number of bedrooms to 120, all en-suite.

The Lounge during the BT era.

It also added a swimming pool, Jacuzzi, sauna and updated the restaurant and public rooms. Shortly after this BT sold the house (around 1992) to Hayley Hotels, which used it as the headquarters of its conference centre business, which ran at several sites. Horwood House is also used for civil weddings.

Horwood House – The BT ground floor building plan
