= Winslow railway station =

Railway station in Buckinghamshire, England

Winslow
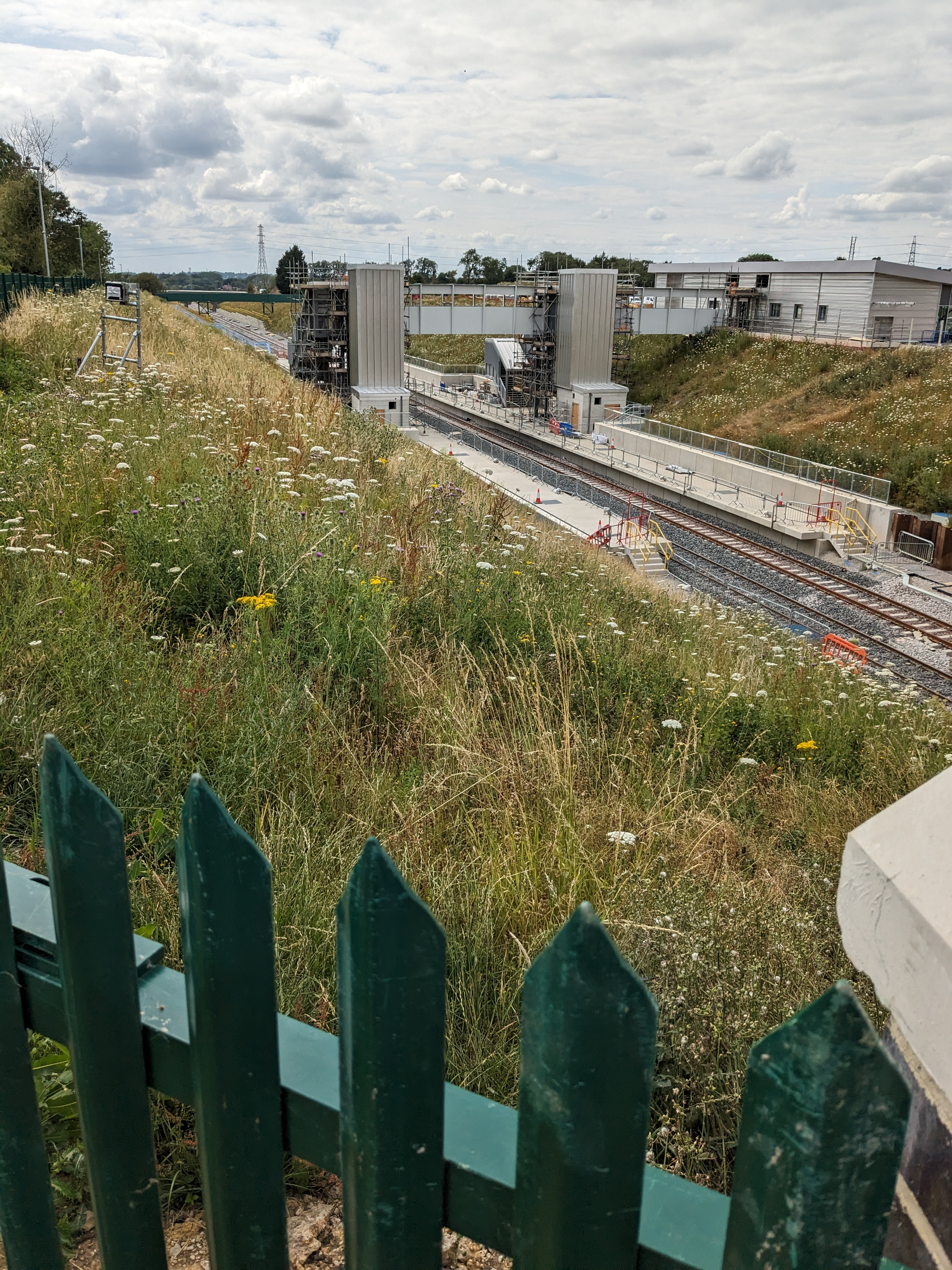
- New railway station for Winslow under construction, June 2023

General information
- Location: Winslow, Buckinghamshire; England
- Coordinates: 51.948°N 0.887°W (new)
- Grid reference: SP772285 (original); SP766283 (new)
- Platforms: 2

History
- Original company: Buckinghamshire Railway
- Pre-grouping: London and North Western Railway
- Post-grouping: London, Midland and Scottish Railway; London Midland Region of British Railways

Key dates
- 1 May 1850: Opened
- 22 May 1967: Closed to goods traffic
- 1 January 1968: Closed to regular passengers
- May 1993: closed completely
- 2026: Planned reopening on a new site
Location

Winslow railway station refers to either one of two railway stations which historically served or is planned to serve, the town of Winslow in north Buckinghamshire, England. The original station (1850–1985) was on the former Varsity Line between Cambridge and Oxford. Since October 2024, construction of a new station is complete and is scheduled to be served by East West Rail, as part of the plan to reinstate the Oxford–Cambridge service. In March 2025, Chiltern Railways announced that it had been appointed to operate passenger services on the EWR line between Oxford and Milton Keynes Central (via Oxford Parkway, Bicester Village, Winslow and Bletchley). Chiltern expects the service to become operational in 2026.

== First station ==
=== Early days ===
Winslow was opened by the Buckinghamshire Railway on 1 May 1850 as part of its line from Banbury to Bletchley. The line was worked from the outset by the London and North Western Railway (LNWR) which absorbed the Buckinghamshire Railway in 1879. The line was subsequently extended westwards to Islip, to a temporary station at Banbury Road and then to Oxford, opening throughout on 20 May 1851. Winslow station was centrally situated at the end of Station Road which branches off from the High Street, serving Winslow, which comprised 1,805 inhabitants at the time. The coming of the railway had a significant impact on the village, resulting in its northward extension and the opening of a "Railway Inn".

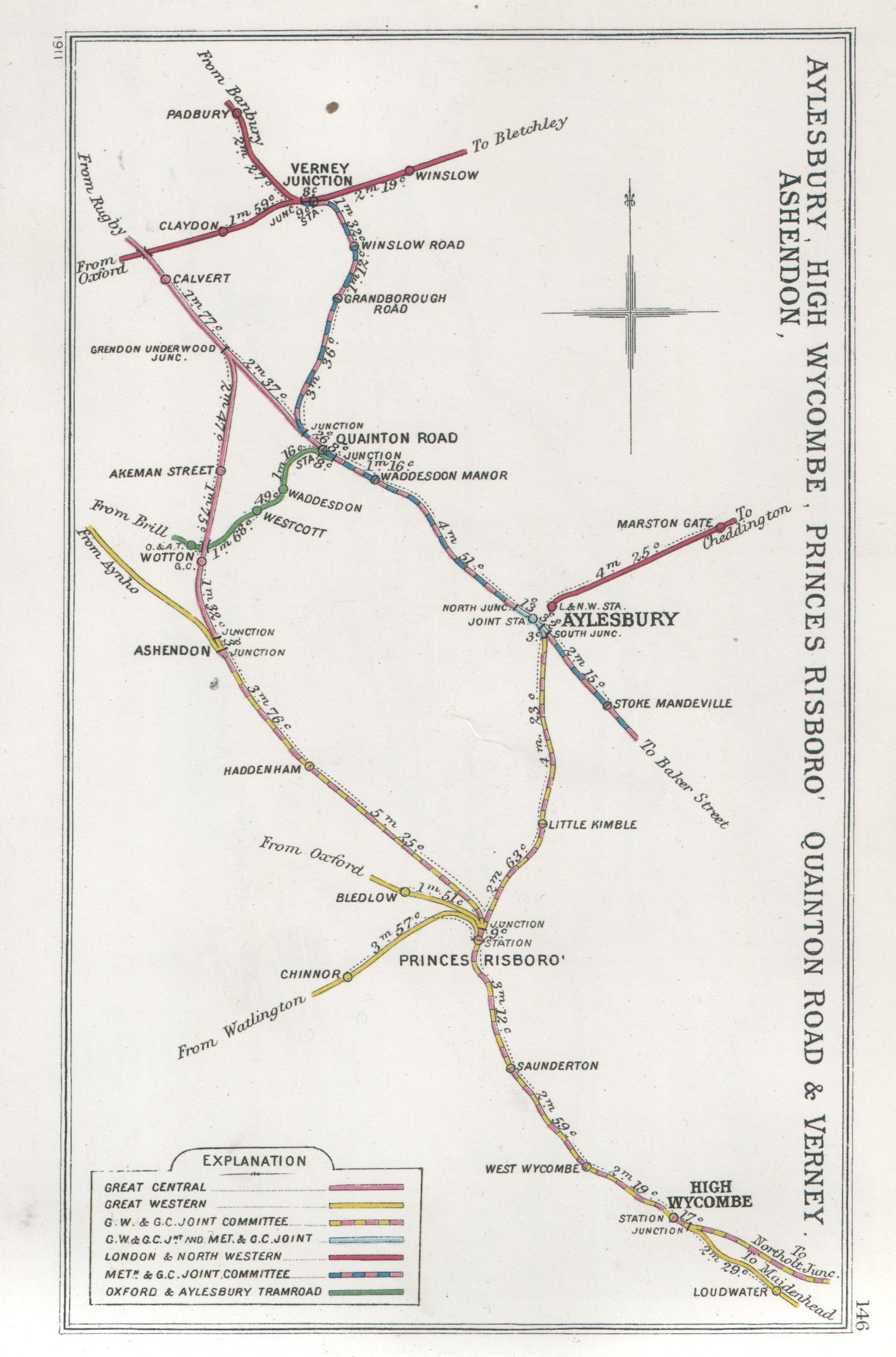
A 1911 Railway Clearing House map of railways in the vicinity of Winslow

Winslow was regarded as an important station on the line, for it was the place where westbound trains for the Banbury Merton Street branch line or for Oxford were joined and divided in the early years, even after the opening of Verney Junction (where the lines actually divided). Passenger facilities were provided on each platform which were more generous than those found elsewhere on the line. Architecturally, the brick station resembled the stone structure provided at Bicester Town, particularly its twin symmetrical gables covered by ridge tiles and its portico. A stationhouse was also provided for the stationmaster and this was situated just beyond the main station building and arranged around a circular driveway at the centre of which was a large horse chestnut tree. A coal yard lay to the east of the station, while a goods yard was provided to the west. Winslow Gasworks opened in 1880 on a site immediately to the south of the coal yard; it received up to 1000 tons of coal annually via the yard, although it was not rail-connected. The station was lit by gas until the trains cease to call.

A typical LNWR goods shed was constructed in the goods yard and contained a crane with a 5-ton capacity. Like Bicester, Winslow had its own signal box with 34 levers which controlled the section between Verney Junction and Bletchley No. 1 box. Two water columns - the only ones between Bletchley and Oxford - supplied water to locomotives, these tanks taking their supply from a large 70,000 imperial gallons (320,000 litres) iron water tower which pumped water from a nearby brook. The columns, which had been manufactured by Edward Bury, may have pre-dated the station itself. Beneath the water tower was a brick engine house and boiler room which also served as accommodation for an LNWR engine driver. Until 1907 there was a long refuge siding trailing off the Up main line behind the Up platform which allowed freight trains stopping to take water to allow a following passenger train to pass. A second siding from the Up main line further to the west led to a turntable; this had been removed by 1925. Three further sidings trailed from the Down line; two for coal and one serving a separate side end loading dock for horses. A final siding served a milk dock at the rear of the Up platform.

=== Closure ===
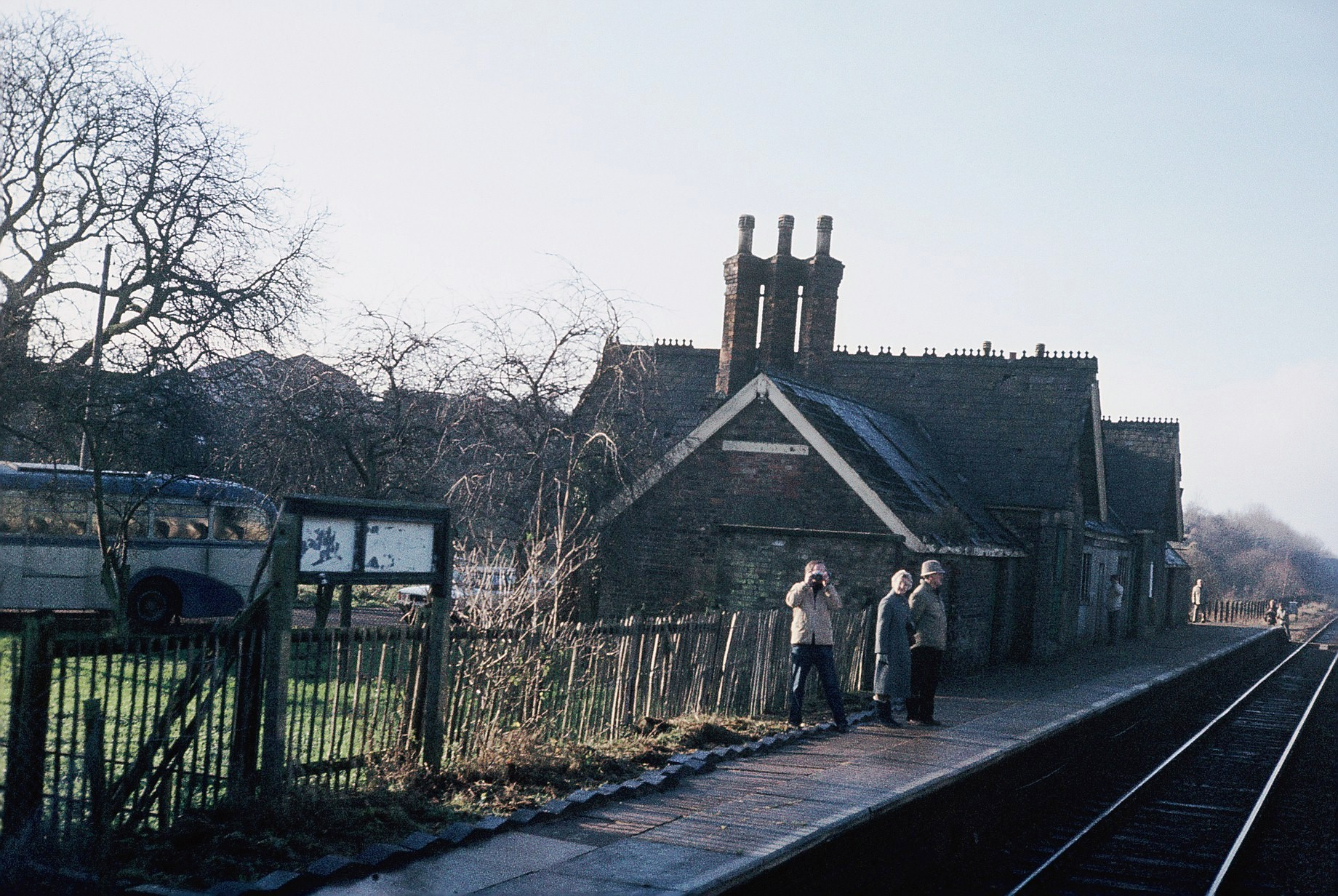
Winslow railway station in 1985

In the wake of the abandonment of a plan to develop the Varsity Line as a freight link from the East Coast ports to South Wales, including a marshalling yard near Swanbourne, Winslow station was listed for closure in the Beeching report which called for the closure of all minor stations on the line. This followed the introduction of diesel trains in an attempt to reduce operating costs after a failed proposal to close the line, which had been put forward in 1959 but successfully resisted by local authorities. With the line's expenses amounting to £199,700 against a revenue of £102,200 in 1964, Winslow duly closed to goods traffic on 22 May 1967 and to passengers on 1 January 1968; the signal box followed one month later. The delay in closure was the result of replacement bus services not being able to handle the projected extra traffic. The line between Oxford and Bletchley was closed to passengers and local goods services, and later singled in 1985.

Winslow station continued to be used during the 1980s for "Chiltern Shopper" specials and British Rail handbills survive which show that services called at the station during November and December between 1984 and 1986. The station building, which was by then in a very derelict state, survived long enough to see the first visit of a Class 43 on 13 February 1993, but was demolished very shortly afterwards. The line between Claydon and Bletchley through Winslow was closed and mothballed in May 1993 following the closure of the ARC stone terminal at Wolverton which had provided the line's last source of traffic. The last train over the section was a Class 56 railtour called "The Mothball" which ran on 29 May 1993 from Waterloo to Bletchley via Winslow. Winslow station site was later developed for housing, (Comerford Way and McLernon Way).

== New station ==
A new station has been built to serve Winslow as part of the East West Rail project. Chiltern Rail services from Winslow to Oxford or Milton Keynes Central are planned to begin in late 2026.

The new station is located at the western outskirts of the town, at the junction of Buckingham Road (A413) with Horwood Road (B4033) at grid reference SP766283. Groundworks began on the site in Summer 2021, with drainage improvements and reshaping of the cutting.

When the line opens, Winslow is to have direct trains to Oxford, Milton Keynes Central and Bedford. The journey time from Winslow to Oxford is estimated at 27 minutes.

In November 2025 at an industry conference, Chiltern's Managing Director Richard Allan spoke disapprovingly of the station's design, describing it as not fit for use in winter. Remedial work is required before the company can accept it. A Network Rail spokesperson said that this work is expected to be completed by the end of the year.

=== Aylesbury connection ===
In March 2021, the East West Rail Company announced that its opening plans for East West Rail have changed, notably deferring indefinitely a connection to Aylesbury.

== Services ==
Preceding station	National Rail	Following station
	Future services	
Bicester Village towards Oxford	Chiltern Railways; Oxford–Milton Keynes Central (or Bedford)	Bletchley towards Bedford or Milton Keynes Central
	Disused railways	
Verney Junction; Line and station closed	British Rail; Varsity Line	Swanbourne; Line and station closed

== Bibliography ==
- Awdry, Christopher (1990). Encyclopaedia of British Railway Companies. Sparkford: Patrick Stephens Ltd. ISBN 1-8526-0049-7. OCLC 19514063. CN 8983.
- Beeching, Richard (1963). "The Reshaping of British Railways" (PDF). HMSO.
- Butt, R. V. J. (October 1995). The Directory of Railway Stations: details every public and private passenger station, halt, platform and stopping place, past and present (1st ed.). Sparkford: Patrick Stephens Ltd. ISBN 978-1-85260-508-7. OCLC 60251199. OL 11956311M.
- Clinker, C. R. (1988) [1978]. Clinker's Register of Closed Passenger Stations and Goods Depots in England, Scotland and Wales 1830–1980 (2nd ed.). Bristol: Avon-Anglia Publications & Services. ISBN 978-0-905466-91-0. OCLC 655703233.
- Davies, R.; Grant, M.D. (1984) [1975]. Forgotten Railways: Chilterns and Cotswolds. Newton Abbot, Devon: David & Charles. ISBN 0-946537-07-0.
- Grigg, A.E. (1980). Town of Trains: Bletchley and the Oxbridge Line. Buckingham: Barracuda Books. ISBN 0-860231-15-1.
- Leleux, Robin (1984) [1976]. A Regional History of the Railways of Great Britain: the East Midlands. Vol. 9. Nairn: David St John Thomas. ISBN 0-946537-06-2.
- Maggs, Colin G. (2010). The Branch Lines of Buckinghamshire. Stroud, Gloucs: Amberley Books. ISBN 978-1-848683-42-6.
- Mitchell, Vic; Smith, Keith (July 2005). Oxford to Bletchley including Verney Junction to Banbury. Country Railway Routes. Middleton Press. ISBN 1-904474-57-8.
- Oppitz, Leslie (2000). Lost Railways of the Chilterns. Newbury, Berks: Countryside Books. ISBN 978-1-853066-43-6.
- Preston Hendry, R.; Powell Hendry, R. (1986). An Historical Survey of Selected LMS Stations. Vol. 2. Poole, Dorset: Oxford Publishing Co. ISBN 0-860933-30-X.
- Quick, Michael (2009) [2001]. Railway passenger stations in Great Britain: a chronology (4th ed.). Oxford: Railway & Canal Historical Society. ISBN 978-0-901461-57-5. OCLC 612226077.
- Reed, M.C. (1996). The London & North Western Railway. Penryn, Cornwall: Atlantic Transport. ISBN 0-906899-66-4.
- Simpson, Bill (1981). Oxford to Cambridge Railway. Vol. 1. Headington, Oxford: Oxford Publishing Co. ISBN 0-860931-20-X.
- Simpson, Bill (2000). The Oxford to Cambridge Railway; Forty years on 1960-2000. Witney, Oxon: Lamplight Publications. ISBN 978-1-899246-05-2.
