= Swanbourne railway station =

Former railway station in Buckinghamshire, England

Swanbourne
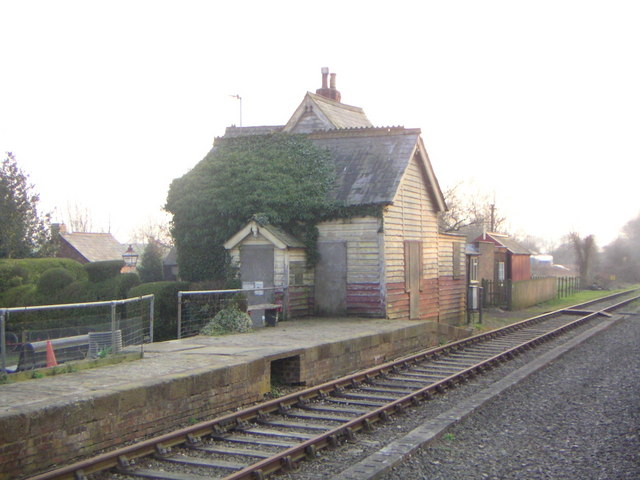
- Swanbourne Station in 2007

General information
- Location: Swanbourne, Buckinghamshire; England
- Grid reference: SP800293
- Platforms: 2

Other information
- Status: Disused

History
- Original company: Buckinghamshire Railway
- Pre-grouping: London and North Western Railway
- Post-grouping: London, Midland and Scottish Railway; London Midland Region of British Railways

Key dates
- c. 1851: Opened
- 1 June 1964: Closed to goods traffic
- 1 January 1968: Closed to passengers
Location

Swanbourne was a railway station that served the villages of Swanbourne, Little Horwood and Mursley in north Buckinghamshire, England. It was on the Bicester to Bletchley line, roughly at the centre of a triangle drawn between the three villages. In summer 2020, the station was demolished to clear the route for East West Rail.

== History ==
Swanbourne was opened by the Buckinghamshire Railway most likely not when the company's line from Banbury to Bletchley opened on 1 May 1850, but rather a short time afterwards. It did not appear in Bradshaw's Guide until October 1851. The line was worked from the outset by the London and North Western Railway which absorbed the Buckinghamshire Railway in 1879. It was subsequently extended westwards to Islip, to a temporary station at Banbury Road and then to Oxford, opening throughout on 20 May 1851.

As it passed through the parish of Little Horwood, the proposed line had been opposed by the Dauncy family, the occupants of Horwood House, who succeeded in having the alignment moved further south into the parish of Swanbourne, which gave the line a distinct curve at this point. In its plans, the Buckinghamshire Railway had referred to the proposed station as "Mursley" after the nearby village of the same name. The station, which eventually took its name from the village of Swanbourne over a mile away, was in an isolated and rural location with no habitations in the immediate locality, a situation which endured until at least 1925. It is situated at the highest point along the line (on a 1 in 214 climb), on the rise of a slight embankment, shielded on its northern side by a small spinney which is rumoured to have been planted by the Dauncy family to hide the railway line.

The station's remote location did not prevent it from developing a healthy goods traffic with income averaging £400 (Note: equivalent to £42,000 in 2025) a week. In its heyday, Swanbourne was the railhead for six local coal merchants and farmers from ten local villages, with healthy livestock, hay, corn and wool traffic flows, as well as butter produced from the herd of pedigree jersey cows kept at Horwood House which was dispatched in special containers of slate and stone to London for Queen Victoria and her household. The butter was sent via a daily milk train which departed Swanbourne each morning at 0830 also carrying supplies brought to the station by cart from local farms. The Rothschilds used to send horses by rail to Swanbourne for a day's hunting with the Whaddon Chase. Although receipts had declined by the 1930s, the station remained prosperous until after the Second World War. It had its own stationmaster until 1929 when the stationmaster at Winslow took over.

Passenger traffic was less important due to the relatively sparsely populated locality. The station buildings are an unusual combination of brick and timber with small windows set at angles and a narrow entrance porch which combine to give the building the appearance of a chalet. The main buildings are situated at the Oxford end of the Down platform which left the remainder of the platform free for a number of small huts, a gentlemen's lavatory and a ground frame. The Up platform only had a wooden waiting shelter similar in appearance to one at Islip. A small goods yard was served by a single siding trailing off from the Down line which was controlled by the ground frame operated by Annett's key. A footpath leads from the Up platform to Horwood House via a flight of steps.

In the wake of the abandonment of a plan to develop the Varsity Line as a freight link from the East Coast ports to South Wales, including a marshalling yard near Swanbourne (see below), the station was listed for closure in the Beeching report which called for the closure of all minor stations on the line. It closed to goods traffic on 1 June 1964 and to passengers on 1 January 1968..The station was demolished in summer 2020.

Preceding station	Disused railways	Following station
Winslow; Line and station closed	British Rail; Varsity Line	Bletchley; Line closed, station open

== Swanbourne sidings ==
Swanbourne sidings
- Interactive map of Swanbourne sidings

Location
- Coordinates: 51.9775°N 0.7915°W

Wartime relief sidings for Bletchley were constructed at the 3 milepost, between Weasel Lane and Whaddon Road at grid reference SP830317. Why the sidings were named "Swanbourne Sidings" is not clear as they were some distance from the station and not even in the parish of Swanbourne. They comprised three reception roads and ten marshalling roads capable of storing 660 wagons which remained busy up until the 1960s. Empty wagons departed for Toton or Overseal, coal went to Sandy and Corby Steelworks, and bricks came from Newton Longville and Lambs Siding to be attached to a London train. The sidings were on the Up side, with a shunting neck and entrance opposite a 30-lever ARP-type signalbox which was opened at the same time. The box survived the closure of the sidings in March 1967 and remained to control the scissor points system which enabled trains to change track; it was taken out of service on 29 July 1984. The sidings themselves were lifted by early 1971.

In 1955, as part of British Railways' (BR) Modernisation Plan, BR proposed to develop the Varsity Line as a freight link from the East Coast ports to South Wales, capable of handling up to 2,400 wagons of coal class traffic and empties daily. At Swanbourne, BR planned to redevelop the sidings and land near Swanbourne station as a marshalling yard where trains could be sorted into the order required for their destinations on the Southern and Western Regions. This would enable smaller goods yards in those regions to be closed, with the freight traffic concentrated at Swanbourne which, like the other proposed marshalling yards, would be equipped with the latest automation technology. Swanbourne was one of seven proposed sites on green field land, the others being Carlisle Kingmoor, Perth, Edinburgh Millerhill, Margam, Brookthorpe and Walcot. In September 1958, work started on the upgrade of the Varsity Line with the construction of the Bletchley Flyover to separate local and long-distance traffic. Compulsory purchase orders were issued for the proposed site including Horwood House, then a boarding school, which was intended by BR to become a training school for the new yard.

However, the construction of the yard was opposed by Gerry Fiennes, appointed BR Chief Operating Officer in 1961, on the basis that it was not justified either from the point of view of existing or potential traffic or as a means of handling the traffic that there was. He effectively put an end to the plans by refusing to send any East Coast Main Line traffic there. At the time, the need for marshalling yards was in question as the movement of goods traffic by the wagonload was gradually being rationalised in favour of the liner train system which would not require the extensive storage facilities provided by marshalling yards. Horwood House, which had been purchased in 1962 at a cost of £30,000, (Note: equivalent to £560,000 in 2025, using a general inflation index rather than property price inflation.) was subsequently given over to the General Post Office. Horwood House is now an hotel.

The site of Swanbourne sidings is now completely overgrown and the ARP-type signalbox was demolished in c. 1989. The old station was demolished in Autumn 2020 as part of the EWR western section.

=== Future ===
In late January 2026, the East West Rail Company announced that it proposes to establish a new train maintenance depot at a site that it calls "Bletchley West". The location for the site seems to be that of the former Swanbourne sidings.

== Present and future ==
It is planned to reopen the route between Bicester Village and Bletchley in 2026 as part of the East West Rail project, but there are no plans to reopen Swanbourne station as it would serve no significant settlement

Until early 2014, a single track of the line remained, although rusted beyond use. From spring 2014, the overgrown sections have been cleared in preparation for the planned reopening of the line.

In the summer 2020 the station and platforms were demolished, to clear the route of the new railway. The main station building had survived into private ownership, the only one of those built by the Buckinghamshire Railway to do so. The station passed into the hands of Reg Waters, a permanent way railwayman, who used the station's goods shed as a garden shed where he also kept a collection of railway relics. The platforms also remained, although significantly covered by grass. The owner had cut the hedge surrounding the buildings into the form of a locomotive; this has attracted much publicity including a photograph in the Daily Telegraph. An oil lamp from Verney Junction has been erected in the garden.
