= British Rail Class 730 =

British EMU from the Bombardier Aventra family

British Rail Class 730 Aventra
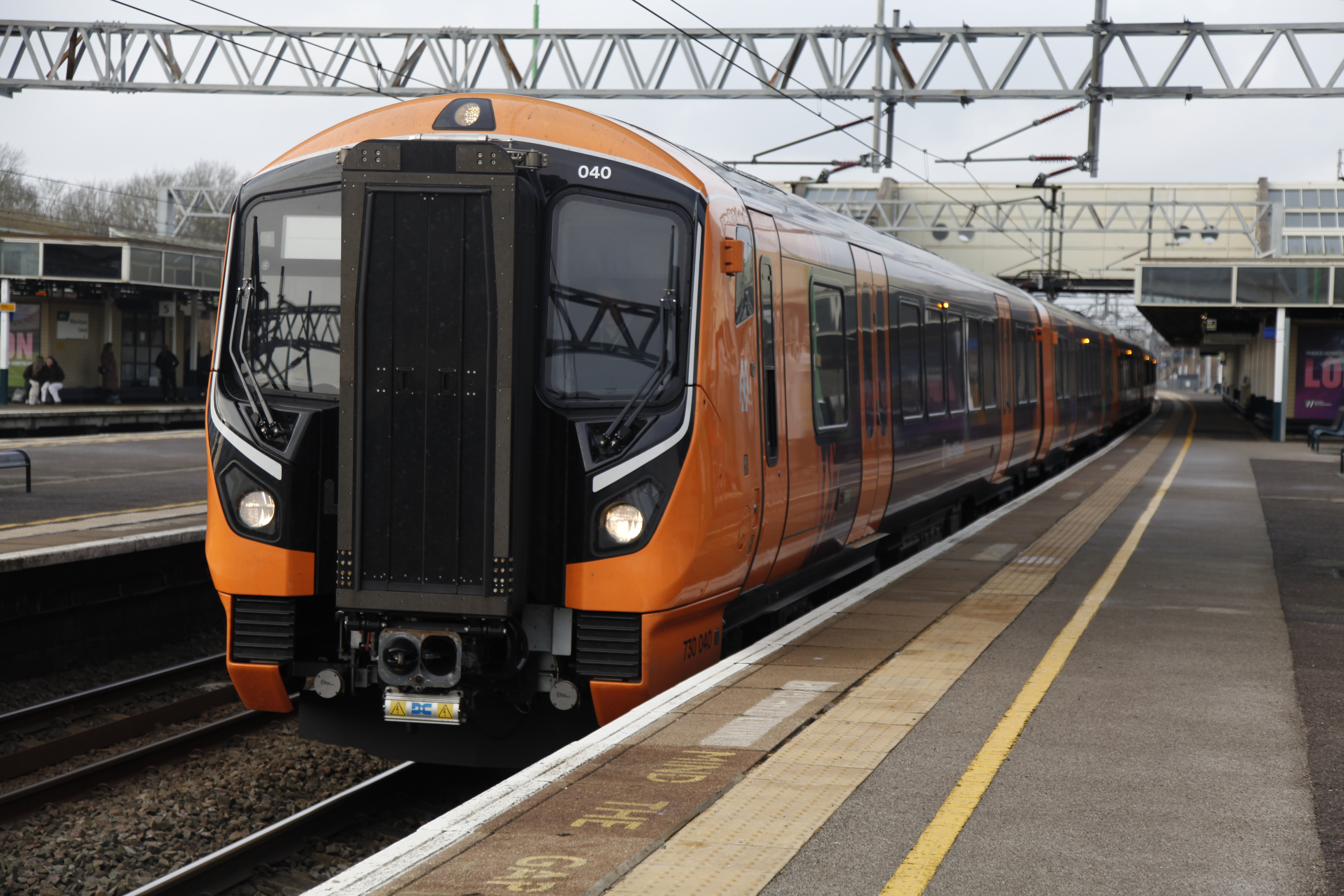
- A Class 730/0 departing Milton Keynes Central in 2025

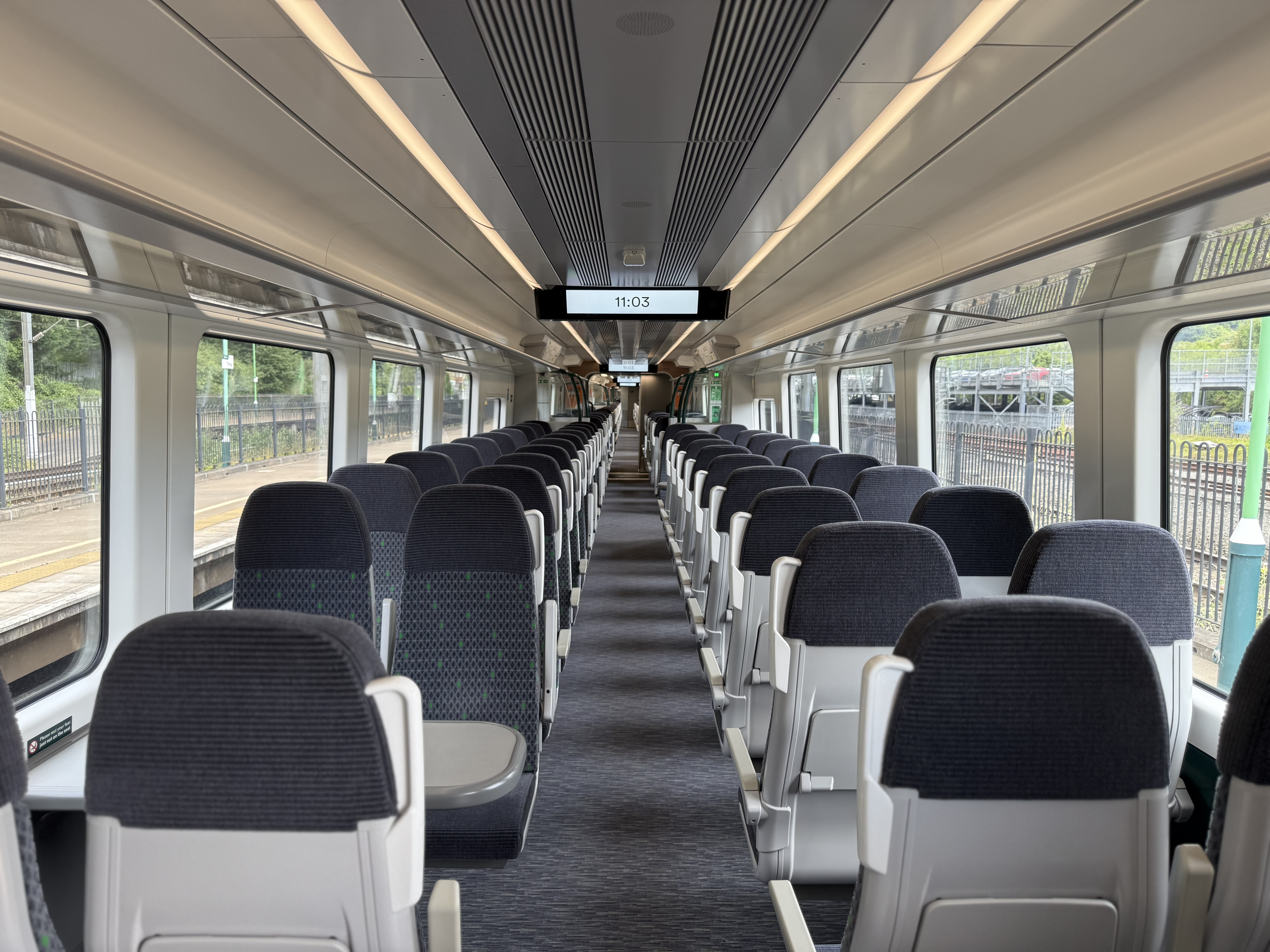
- Class 730/2 interior
- Stock type: Electric multiple unit
- In service: 13 November 2023 – present (730/0); 9 June 2025 – present (730/2)
- Manufacturers: Bombardier Transportation (prior to 2021); Alstom (between 2021 and 2024)
- Built at: Derby Litchurch Lane Works
- Family name: Aventra
- Replaced: Class 319; Class 323; Class 350/2
- Constructed: 2020–2024
- Number built: 84
- Formation: 3 cars per 730/0 unit: DM1-PMLW-DM2; 5 cars per 730/2 unit: DM-M1L-PMLW-M2L-DMC
- Diagram: 730/0 units: DM vehicles: EL249; PMLW vehicles: ER250; 730/2 units: DM vehicles: EL251; M1L vehicles: ER256; PMLW vehicles: ER255; M2L vehicles: ER254; DMC vehicles: EA316
- Capacity: 3-car: 201 seats; 5-car: 406 seats
- Owners: Current: Porterbrook; Former: Corelink Rail
- Operator: West Midlands Trains
- Depots: Present: Oxley (Wolverhampton); Soho (Birmingham); Coventry North Yard; Future: Bescot (Walsall); Bletchley (Milton Keynes)
- Lines served: West Coast Main Line; Wolverhampton–Walsall via Birmingham New Street; Cross-City Line; Chase Line

Specifications
- Car length: 24 m (79 ft)
- Doors: Double-leaf sliding plug; (2 per side per car)
- Maximum speed: 3-car: 90 mph (145 km/h); 5-car: 110 mph (180 km/h)
- Electric system: 25 kV 50 Hz AC overhead
- Current collection: Pantograph
- Bogies: Bombardier Flexx-Eco
- Safety systems: AWS; TPWS
- Coupling system: Dellner
- Multiple working: Within class; 730/0: max. 3 units
- Track gauge: 1,435 mm (4 ft 8 1/2 in) standard gauge

The British Rail Class 730 Aventra is a type of electric multiple unit passenger train built by Alstom for West Midlands Trains. Two separate batches of the fleet were built; 48 three-car units and 36 five-car units.

== History ==
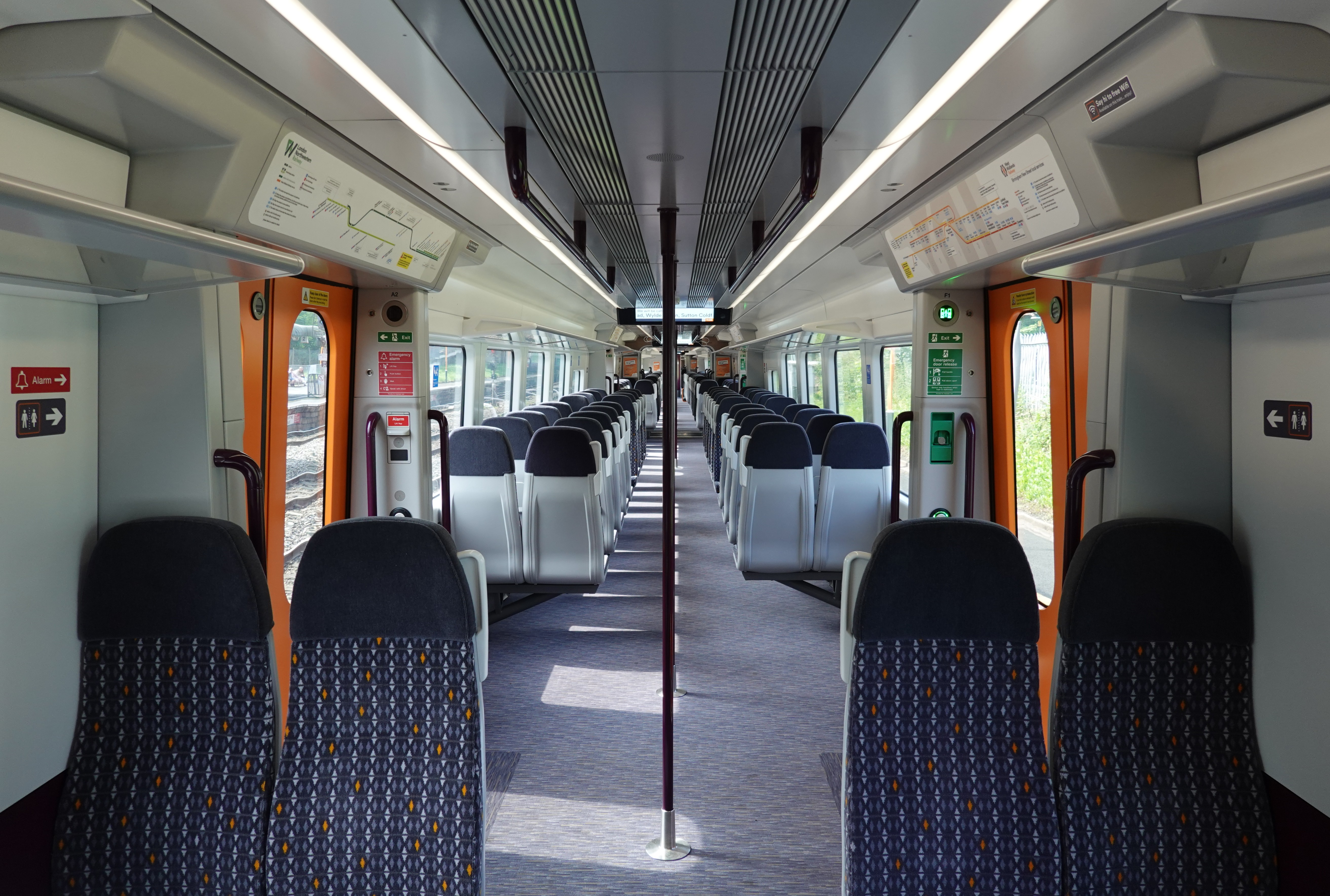
Class 730/0 West Midlands Railway interior

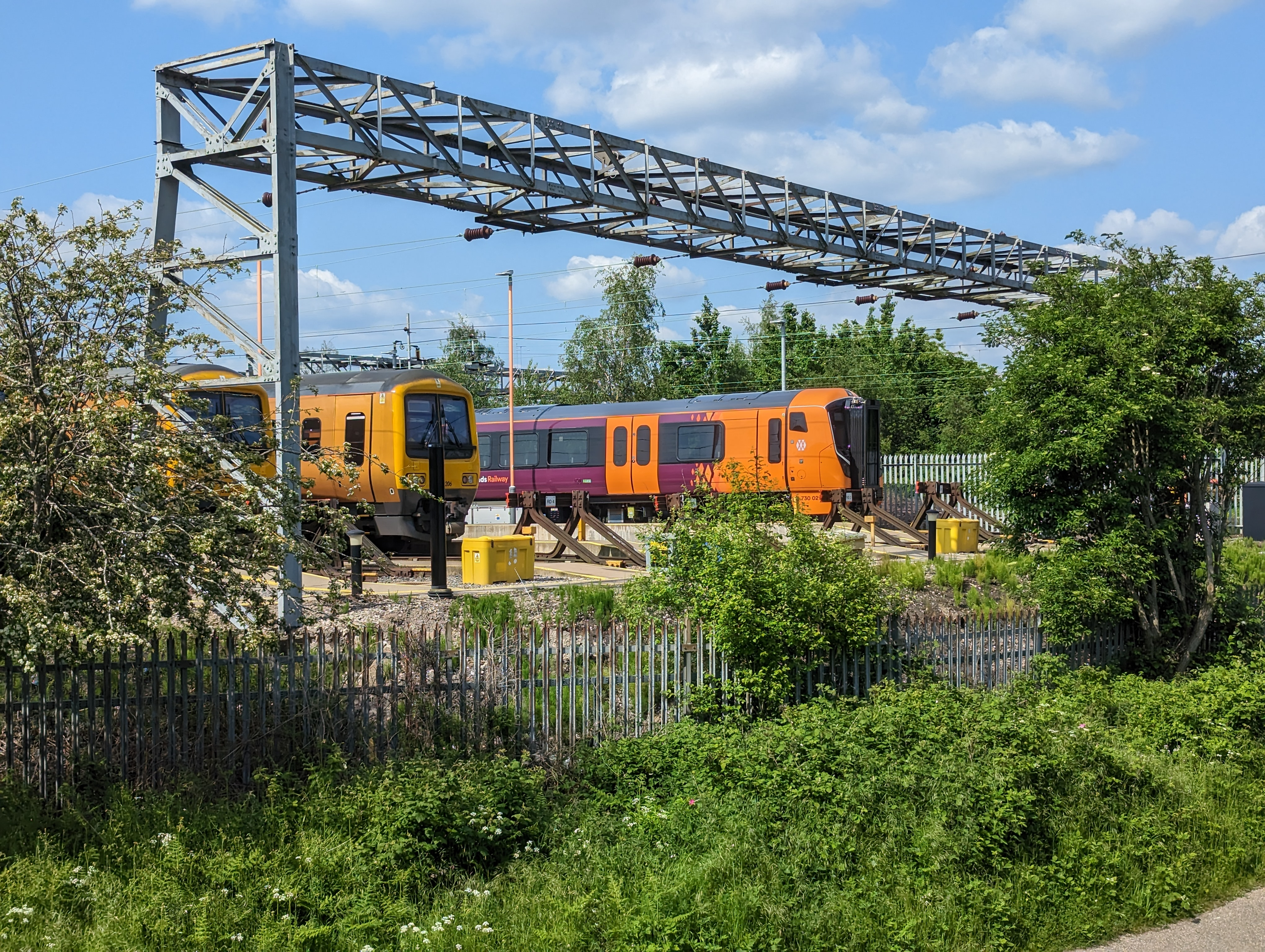
Class 730/0 unit alongside two Class 323 units at Soho Depot.

In October 2017, West Midlands Trains were awarded the franchise to operate local rail services around Birmingham and the West Midlands, suburban services to London Euston, and long-distance inter-urban services operating from both Euston and Birmingham New Street. At the time the franchise was awarded, the company announced that it would procure more than 100 new trains at a cost of £680 million to replace older rolling stock and enhance its fleet. Of these, a total of 81 EMUs were ordered from Bombardier Transportation from its Aventra product range. They were built at Derby Litchurch Lane Works. The first completed train was unveiled in September 2020.

In 2022, the order was amended to increase the proportion of three-car units in the fleet, which will result in the delivery of 48 three-car units and 36 five-car units instead of the original plan for 36 three-car units, Class 730/0, and 45 five-car units, Class 730/1 and Class 730/2 – a total of 324 vehicles in 84 units.

== Testing and introduction into service ==
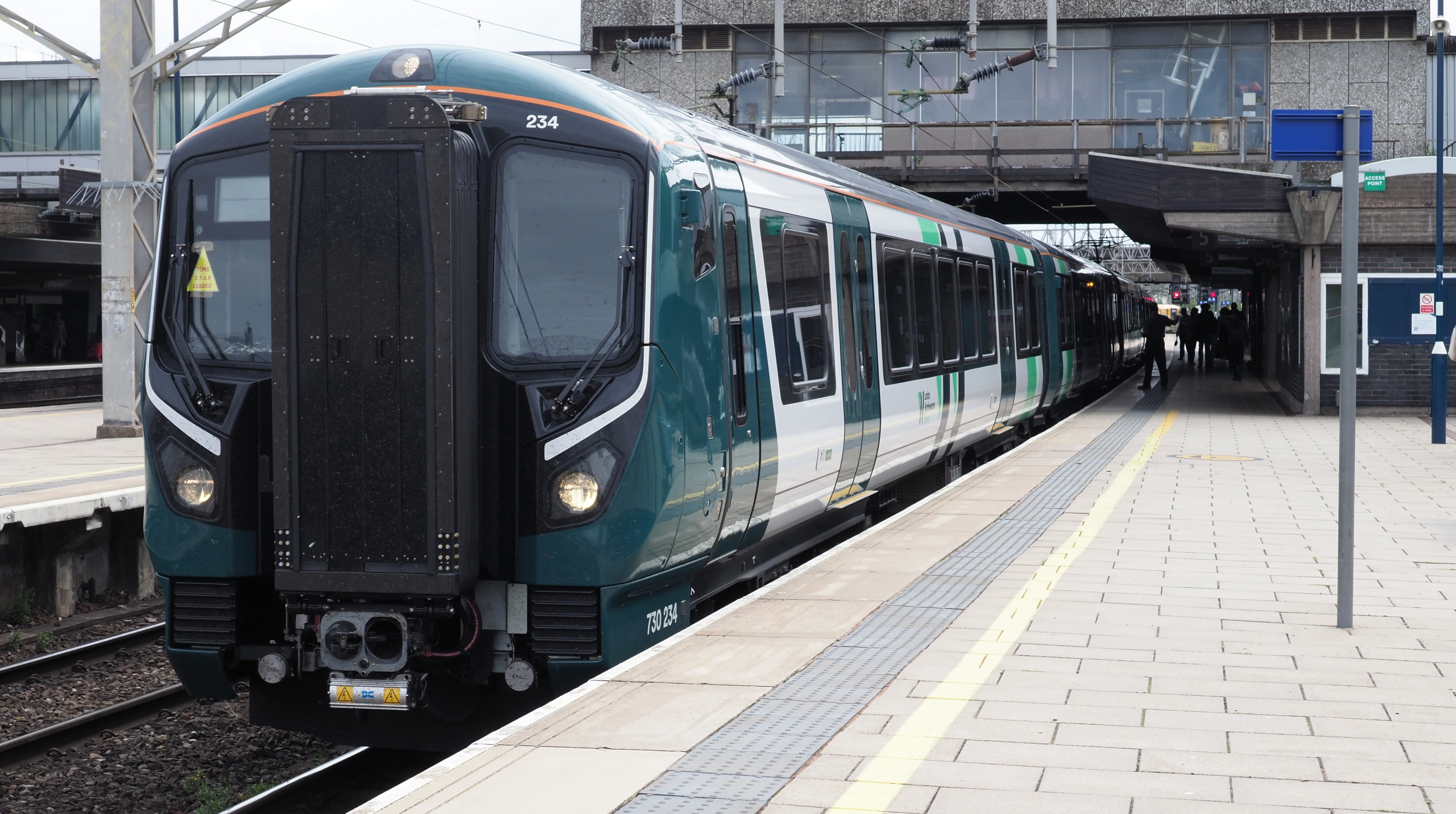
London Northwestern Railway Class 730/2 in service at Stafford

The Class 730/0 trains entered service on 13 November 2023 and were the second new fleet to be introduced by West Midlands Trains, following the Class 196 which entered service on 17 October 2022.

The introduction of the Class 730 on the Cross-City line in 2024 enables the withdrawal of Class 323 units, 17 of which will be cascaded to Northern Trains. It will also allow for the withdrawal of the Class 350/2 units on the West Midlands Trains network.

The Class 730 was tested in Velim in Czechia, as well as in the UK. Testing of Class 730 units on the West Midlands Trains network began in March 2021, and in February 2022 the then full order of 36 Class 730/0 units received authorisation for service from the Office of Rail and Road.

The three-car Class 730 units are currently being used on West Coast Main Line services out of London. This allowed for the withdrawal of Class 319s. The first three-car Class 730 entered passenger service on the Wolverhampton-Birmingham-Walsall services in February 2024, with the units being introduced on Cross-City Line services in the Spring. The first pair of Class 730 units entered service on the Cross-City Line on 15 April 2024. The three-car Class 730/0 units will be maintained at Soho Depot in Birmingham which is the home depot of the Class 323s and the five-car Class 730/2 units will be maintained at Bletchley Depot in Milton Keynes. In 2020, West Midlands Trains planned to maintain them at Bescot Depot in Walsall.

The first of the Class 730/2 trains entered service on 9 June 2025.

== Fleet details ==
The two separate batches were constructed to operate at different maximum speeds to suit different uses. The three-car Class 730/0 trains—designed for Cross-City Line and Birmingham local services— operate at up to 90 mph (140 km/h), and were built to double capacity on the Cross-City Line. The five-car Class 730/2 trains will operate on outer suburban and long-distance LNR services and will operate at up to 110 mph (180 km/h).

Subclass	Operator	Qty.	Year built	Cars per unit	Unit nos.
730/0	West Midlands Trains	48	2020–2024	3	730001–730048
730/2	West Midlands Trains	36	2020–2024	5	730201-730236

=== Named units ===
All 48 West Midlands Railway Class 730/0 units, dubbed the Landmark Class are to be named after landmarks within the West Midlands.

Number	Name	Notes
730018	Hurst Street	Officially named on 23 May 2024 to celebrate Birmingham Pride. This was the first Class 730/0 to be named. The unit has also had a pride livery applied, with the faded diamond motif in pride colours.

=== Illustration ===
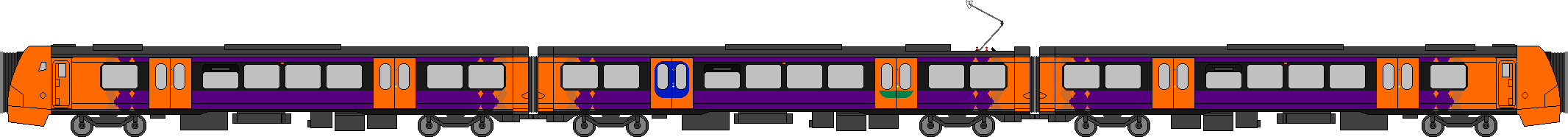
Class 730/0 3-car unit
