= Bescot TMD =

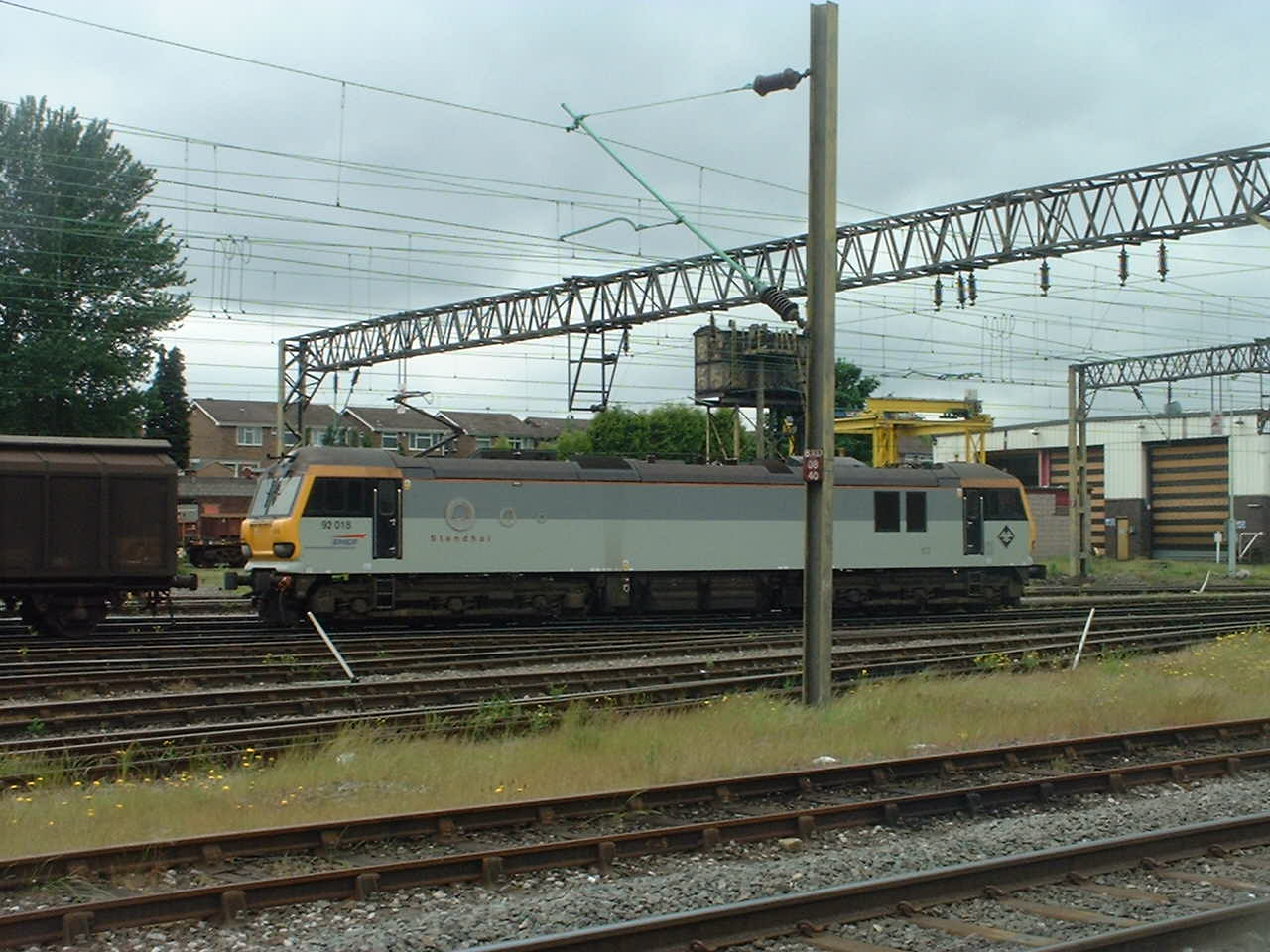
- A Class 92 locomotive at Bescot in June 2005
- Interactive map of Bescot TMD

Location
- Location: Bescot, Walsall, England
- Coordinates: 52.5626°N 1.9918°W
- OS grid: SP005961

Characteristics
- Owner: DB Schenker Rail (UK)
- Depot code: BS (1973 – present)
- Type: Diesel

History
- Opened: May 1967
- Pre-grouping: Grand Junction Railway
- Post-grouping: London Midland and Scottish Railway
- BR region: London Midland Region
- Former depot code: 3A (1948–1960); 21B (1960–1963); 2F (1963–1973)

Bescot TMD is a locomotive traction maintenance depot in Bescot, an area of Walsall in the West Midlands, England. Situated adjacent to Bescot Stadium railway station, the depot with code BS is currently operated by DB Schenker Rail (UK). Bescot Yard is to the south-east of the depot. This entire complex of track is clearly visible from the northern end of the M6 and M5 motorway junction. The Depot is located on the Chase Line and the Walsall-Wolverhampton Line. It is also to become West Midlands Trains new depot to maintain their new Class 730s.

== History ==
The line via Aston, Perry Barr and Bescot is the former Grand Junction Railway, opened in 1837. The section between Walsall and Cannock was constructed by the South Staffordshire Railway. The section between Cannock and Rugeley was constructed by the Cannock Mineral Railway. Bescot Yard was opened to handle coal and goods traffic in the Birmingham area, and so needed a depot to provide and service a wide range of locomotives. After the LMS took over in 1923, the shed code became 3A. The shed was rebuilt as a straight-road pre-cast concrete structure with brick infill sides in the 1930s.

The line between Walsall and Rugeley Trent Valley closed to passengers in 1965, remaining open to freight. This brought about the closure of the LMS steam shed, and the opening of the diesel shed. The Walsall line then reopened to passengers in stages.

The diesel depot, itself, was opened by British Rail in May 1967 as a three-track through-road shed, with an adjoining one-track through-road shed for fuelling.

By 1987, the depot had an allocation of Classes 08, 20, 31 and 47 diesel locomotives. Classes 45, 56, and 58 could also be seen stabled at the depot.

=== Post-privatisation ===
After the sell-off of British Rail, the shed was allocated to primary freight operator English Welsh and Scottish Railway. However, after the downturn in traffic post the 2008 financial crisis, since 2009 the depot had no allocation of locomotives and was only used for light maintenance and fueling. In December 2013, the former LMS steam Sheds still remained but were isolated from the system and boarded up. Bescot steam shed was demolished during December 2013 and had completely vanished by February 2014

== Future ==
In 2012, Transport authority Centro urged the UK Government to look at making Bescot into a freight station instead of constructing a new station from scratch, in order to cope with increasing freight services. A re-opening of the South Staffordshire Line between Stourbridge and Walsall (it has been closed as far as Brierley Hill since 1993) is also proposed, which would allow freight trains to enter Bescot TMD via the Bescot curve.

In January 2020, West Midlands Trains announced plans to develop the site as the main depot for their new Class 730 Aventra EMUs.
