= Percy Thrower =

British gardener and broadcaster (1913–1988)

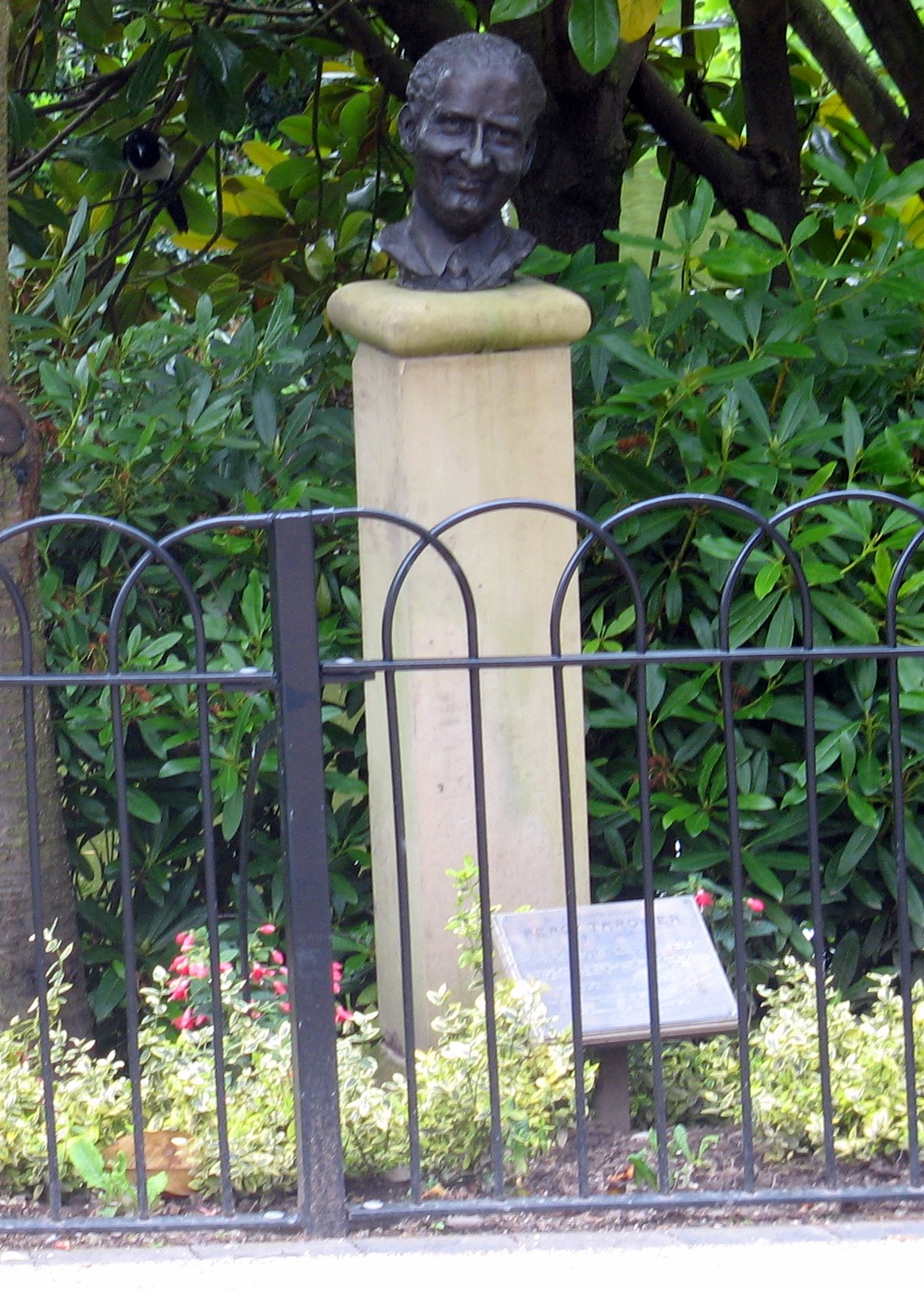
A bust of Percy Thrower in the Dingle gardens of The Quarry, Shrewsbury, Shropshire.

Percy John Thrower MBE (30 January 1913 – 18 March 1988) was a British gardener, horticulturist, broadcaster and writer born at Horwood House in the village of Little Horwood, Buckinghamshire.

Thrower became nationally known through presenting gardening programmes, starting in 1956 with the BBC's Gardening Club, then the BBC's Gardeners' World from 1969 until 1976.

== Career as gardener ==
The surname Thrower is peculiar to East Anglia, where Percy's father worked as a gardener at Bawdsey Manor, Suffolk, before moving to Horwood House near Bletchley, Buckinghamshire, as head gardener. Percy Thrower was determined from an early age to be a head gardener like his father, and worked under him at Horwood House for four years after leaving school. He then became a journeyman gardener in 1931, at the age of 18, at the Royal Gardens at Windsor Castle, on £1 a week. He lived in the bothy at Windsor, along with twenty other improver gardeners and disabled ex-servicemen who were employed on full wages. He spent five years there under the supervision of the head gardener, Charles Cook, who was subsequently to become his father-in-law.

Thrower left Windsor on 1 August 1935 for the City of Leeds Parks Department as a journeyman. There he passed the Royal Horticultural Society's General Exam. In 1937, he moved to Derby Parks Department, initially as a journeyman, but was promoted to be a foreman, General Foreman and finally the Assistant Parks Superintendent. At Derby, he met John Maxfield, whom he considered to be the best gardener he ever worked with. Percy studied and passed the National Diploma in Horticulture (N.D.H.) at the second attempt. He also became a lecturer at Derby Technical College.

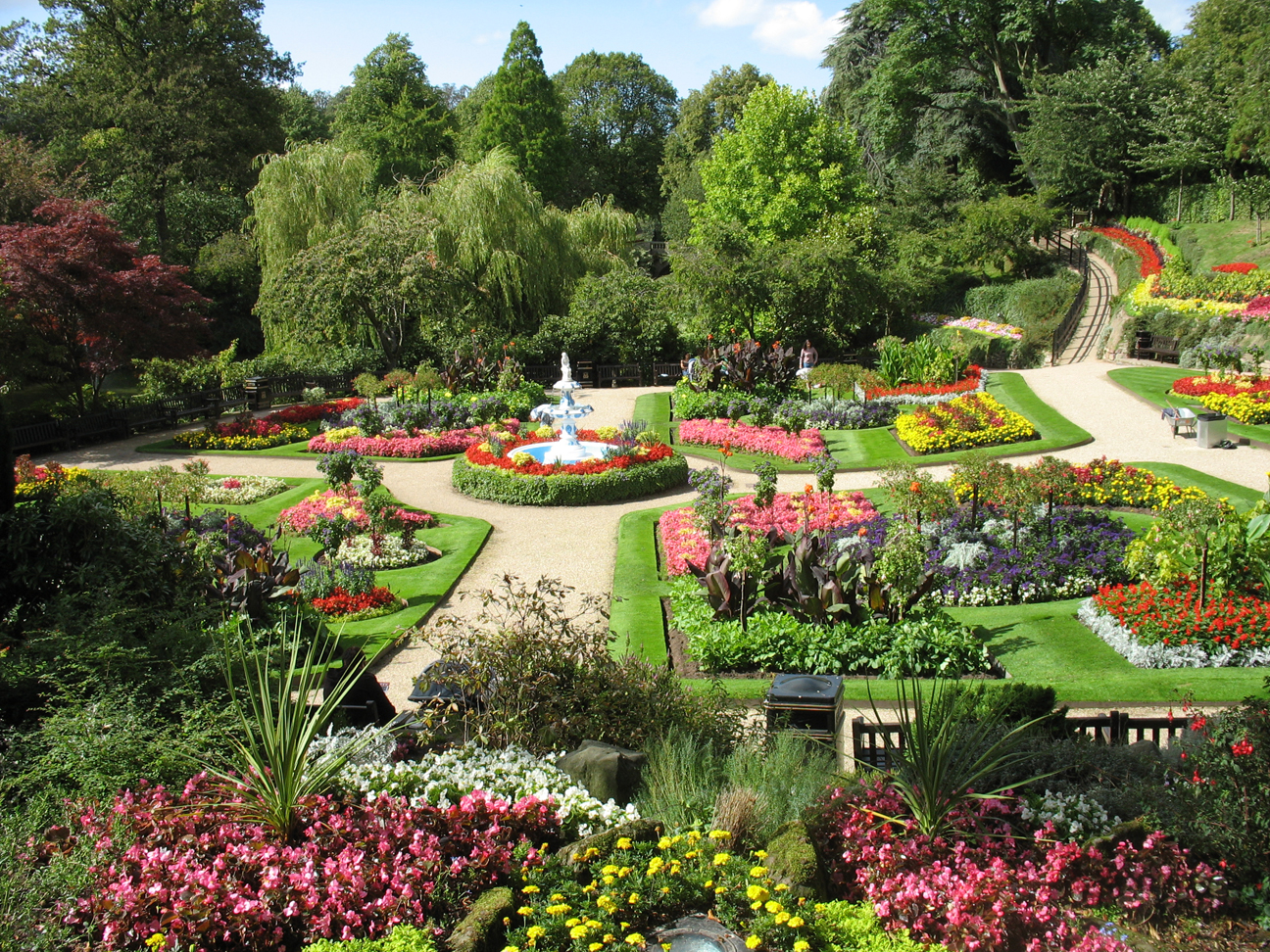
The Dingle, in The Quarry, Shrewsbury

Thrower became engaged to Connie (Constance Margaret Ina) Cook, the daughter of Charles Cook, now the head gardener at Sandringham, having moved from Windsor, where Edward VIII and Mrs Simpson had interfered with the running of the gardens. In order to help him, Queen Mary, in residence at Sandringham after the death of her husband George V, instigated his move from Windsor to Sandringham. On 9 September 1939, at Sandringham, Percy and Connie married. The couple received a wedding gift of a set of Burslem china dishes from Queen Mary.

While at Derby, Thrower became a leading light in the "Dig for Victory" campaign in the Second World War, carrying out educational visits to many of the local parks and even Derby Sewerage Works. Percy became a Special Constable on fire-watching duties after twice being turned down for active service after volunteering. A football pools win of £52 enabled him to buy his first car, a Morris Eight.

Thrower's final career move was to Shrewsbury where on 1 January 1946, he was appointed Parks Superintendent, becoming the youngest parks superintendent. He had a staff of about 35. He had reached the top of his profession at just 32 years of age and it was his sole ambition in life. He remained in post until 1974 though he expected to stay only four or five years.

Thrower from his first year in Shrewsbury helped the post-war revival of the Shrewsbury Flower Show in a role as horticultural advisor and eventually chairman of the Shropshire Horticultural Society. After the show made severe losses due to bad weather in 1970, Thrower and Doug Whittingham both stood as financial guarantors to enable the show, which made a profit in better conditions in 1971, to continue.

In 1951, Thrower was asked to design a garden in the Tiergarten area of Berlin on the lines of an English garden on behalf of the Shropshire Horticultural Society. He did this with the Berlin Superintendent of Parks, Herr Witte. British Foreign Secretary Anthony Eden opened the garden in May 1952. Thrower made his first TV appearance in 1951 in a programme about this garden.

== Broadcasting and business ventures ==
For many years, Thrower was the leading face and voice of British gardening on television and radio. Alan Titchmarsh credited him with inspiring his own passion for gardening.

Godfrey Baseley, the presenter of a Midland regional BBC radio programme, Beyond the Back Door, recognized Thrower's enthusiasm and talents, offering him a regular slot. The first TV series associated with him was Country Calendar, followed by Out and About. When colour television came along, this programme was renamed Gardeners' World. He gained national recognition through presenting these programmes and regularly hosted Gardeners' World from 1969 until 1976.

Thrower was also the gardener on the children's programme Blue Peter from 1974 until 1987, appearing in over a hundred broadcasts and establishing the Blue Peter garden at BBC TV Centre.

In 1983, the Italianate garden was destroyed by vandals, ruining all of Thrower's work and leaving him desolate. The footballer Les Ferdinand had grown up in the area, and on one occasion, when being interviewed, was asked (in what Ferdinand called "obviously a light-hearted conversation") if he was involved. Although Ferdinand said he had no knowledge of the events, as the discussion continued he eventually joked that he had "helped (them) over the wall"; the next day, he was approached by a tabloid journalist bearing pictures of a sobbing Thrower, telling Ferdinand they were intending to put his "confession" on the front page.

Thrower's work for the BBC was not restricted to gardening. In the 1960s, Thrower, a habitual pipe smoker, was asked by the radio producer Tony Shryane to provide sound effects for The Archers. He gave up smoking after a heart attack in 1985.

In 1963, Thrower built his own house, "The Magnolias", near Shrewsbury, on land he acquired with a friend in the small village of Merrington, 6 miles (9.7 km) north west of Shrewsbury. This gave him a garden of about one and a half acres to "play with", something which he had never had before. The garden subsequently became the location for some of the episodes of Gardeners' World. He opened the garden to the public in 1966, and this became an annual event to raise money for charity. The Magnolias was demolished in 2014 as a result of structural damage.

In 1967, Thrower became involved with the development of what was one of the first garden centres, Syon Park, near Brentford, Middlesex, owned by the Duke of Northumberland and backed by Plant Protection, a division of ICI, who had leased 50 acres (200,000 m^{2}) from the Duke. The centre was a success at first, but then sales tailed off and Thrower left the project. In 1970, in partnership with Duncan Murphy, he bought the firm of Murrell's of Shrewsbury and turned it into the Percy Thrower Garden Centre.

Thrower retired in 1974 from the post of Superintendent of Parks at Shrewsbury and started a weekly column for the Daily Mail in 1975. He also wrote for several other papers, notably the Daily Express and the Sunday Express. He wrote for the magazine Amateur Gardening and also wrote many books, which were published by Collingbridge and later Hamlyn.

The BBC dropped Thrower in 1975 when he agreed a contract with Plant Protection, for a series of commercials on independent television. He did this in the full knowledge of what the repercussions would be with the BBC, and later said it was the best contract he ever signed.

As a television personality, Thrower appeared with Morecambe and Wise (1971) and Benny Hill, and was featured in a This is Your Life programme in 1976.

In 1976, Thrower gave a lecture to the Royal Institution titled "Changing Fashions in Gardening", and in 1977 wrote his memoirs, My Lifetime of Gardening. In 1974, the Royal Horticultural Society awarded him their highest honour, the Victoria Medal of Honour and was appointed a Member of the Order of the British Empire (MBE) in 1984.

Thrower also became involved in hosting gardening tours in Europe, with travel agent Harold Sleigh. They established the Percy Thrower Floral Tours Company, chartering ships for lecture cruises and he was also involved in English Gardening Weekends. On one of these he was taken ill, and a decline in his health set in. He never fully recovered from a heart bypass operation in 1987 and eventually Hodgkin's disease was diagnosed. He made his last recording for Blue Peter from hospital one week before he died.

== Personal life ==
Thrower and his wife had three daughters: Margaret, born 1944, Susan, born 1948, and Ann, born 1952. They were all involved with the Percy Thrower Garden Centre. Percy had a succession of black labradors, after duck shooting with his maternal grandfather, who had one as a gun dog. He was a fan of West Bromwich Albion Football Club.

== Death ==
Thrower died at the Royal Hospital, Wolverhampton on 18 March 1988, aged 75. A public funeral took place at St Chad's Church, Shrewsbury on 25 March, after which he was cremated.
