= Little Horwood =

Village in Buckinghamshire, England

Coordinates: 51.968°N 0.850°W

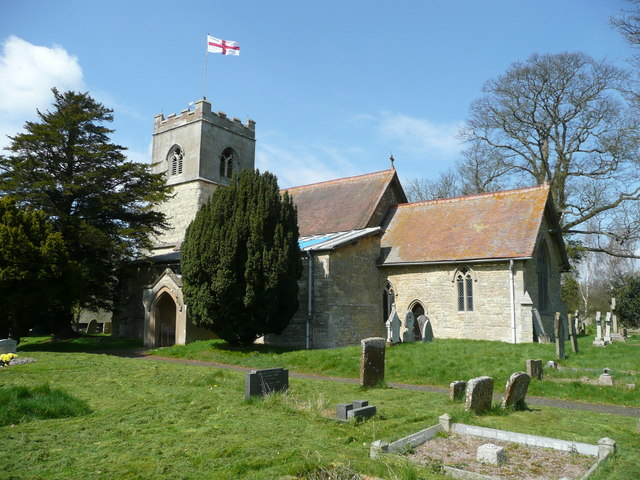
- St Nicholas' parish church

- Location within Buckinghamshire
- Population: 434 (2011 Census)
- OS grid reference: SP7930
- Civil parish: Little Horwood
- Unitary authority: Buckinghamshire
- Ceremonial county: Buckinghamshire
- Region: South East
- Country: England
- Sovereign state: United Kingdom
- Post town: MILTON KEYNES
- Postcode district: MK17
- Dialling code: 01296
- Police: Thames Valley
- Fire: Buckinghamshire
- Ambulance: South Central
- UK Parliament: Buckingham and Bletchley
- Website: Little Horwood Parish Council

Little Horwood is a village and civil parish in Buckinghamshire, England, within the Buckinghamshire Council unitary authority area. The village is about four miles east-south-east of Buckingham and two miles north-east of Winslow.

== Heritage ==
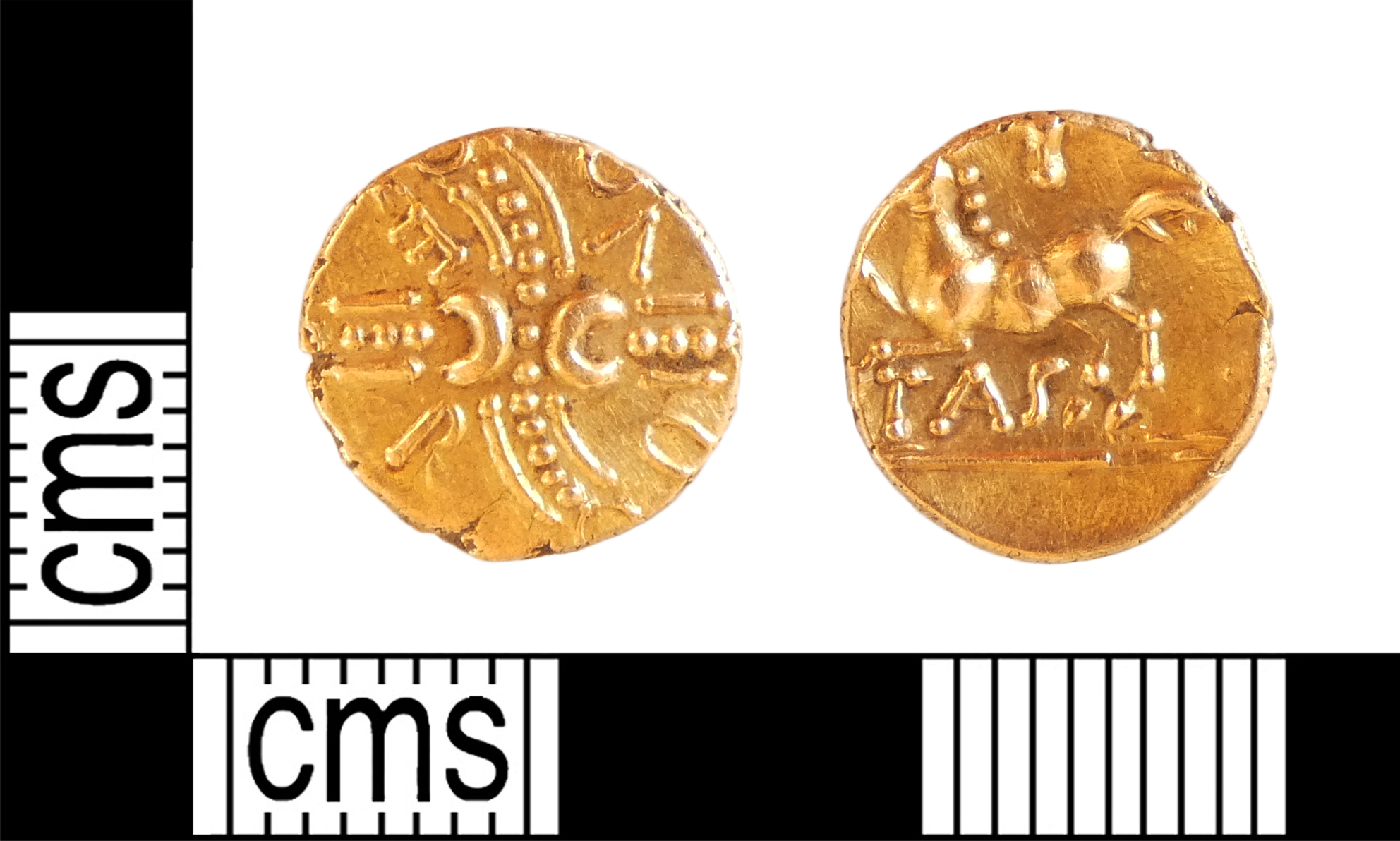
An Iron Age gold stater coin, dated to between c. 20 BCE and c. 10 CE and found in Little Horwood in 2019

The village toponym Horwood derives from the Old English for "dirty or muddy wood". The Anglo-Saxon Chronicle of 792 records the village as Horwudu.

The Church of England parish church of Saint Nicholas has a Perpendicular Gothic belltower built of large blocks of ashlar. The remainder of the church externally dates from the restoration of 1889 by James Piers St Aubyn. The interior remains relatively unaltered, retaining early 16th-century wall paintings depicting the seven deadly sins, a Jacobean pulpit and a Decorated Gothic chancel arch. The Tower has a ring of five bells, with a tenor of 9cwt 2qtrs 22lbs, tuned to the note of G.

The manor of Little Horwood anciently belonged to the abbot and convent of St Albans, but was seized by the Crown with the Dissolution of the Monasteries in the mid-16th century. It was later sold to George Villiers, 1st Duke of Buckingham, who remodelled a manor house that has since been demolished.

One mile south-east of the village is Horwood House. The Grade II listed Little Horwood Manor is a comparatively modern house, designed by A. S. G. Butler in 1938 for the industrialist George Gee.

Located between the village and nearby Great Horwood is RAF Little Horwood, a World War II airfield was built in 1940, and was operational from 1942 to 1946.

== Transport ==
Little Horwood has an occasional daytime, weekday bus link to Milton Keynes. The nearest railway station is at Milton Keynes Central (8½ miles/14 km).

== Notable person ==
- Percy Thrower (1913–1988), television gardening presenter, was born at Horwood House, half a mile from the village, son of the head gardener.
