= Soho TMD =

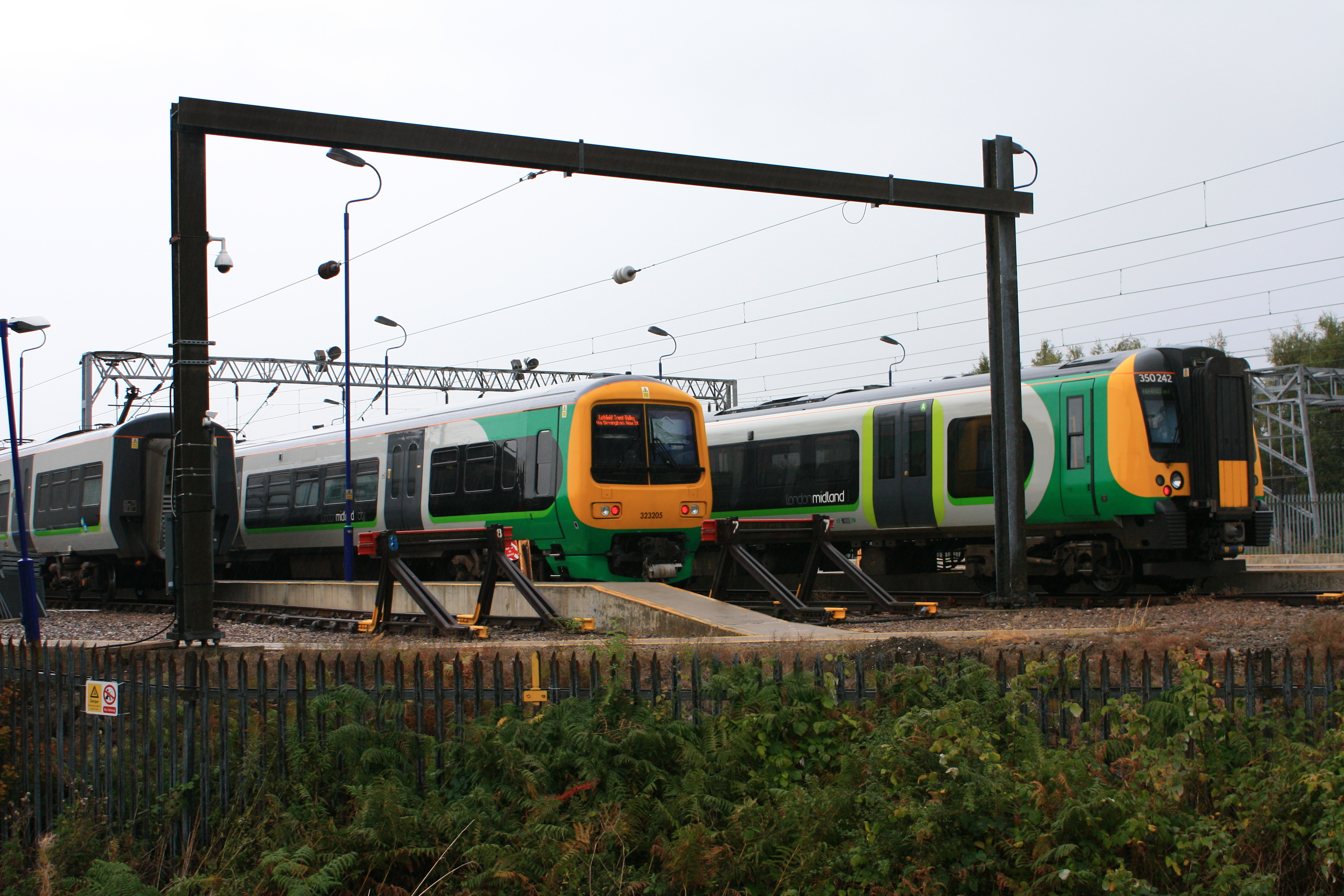
- EMUs at the depot
- Interactive map of Soho TMD

Location
- Location: Smethwick, Birmingham, England
- Coordinates: 52.4925°N 1.9436°W
- OS grid: SP039882

Characteristics
- Operator: West Midlands Railway
- Depot code: SI (1973-); SO
- Rolling stock: Class 730

History
- Former rolling stock: Class 323

Soho TMD is a railway traction maintenance depot situated in Smethwick, West Midlands, England. It is located in Smethwick's industrial area of Soho on the boundary with Birmingham, its depot code is SO. The depot is approximately 2 mi (3.2 km) west of Birmingham New Street station. The Depot serves the Cross-City Line.

== Operations ==
Soho was purpose built as a depot for maintaining the former West Midlands based Class 323 EMU fleet.

Soho is operated by West Midlands Trains having been transferred over from the former London Midland franchise in 2017. Before that it was operated by Central Trains until 11 November 2007.

It is the home depot for WMT's Class 730/0 EMU fleet, where most maintenance of the units takes place, it is also used to stable Class 350 EMUs.
