= Bletchley Flyover =

Railway viaduct in Buckinghamshire

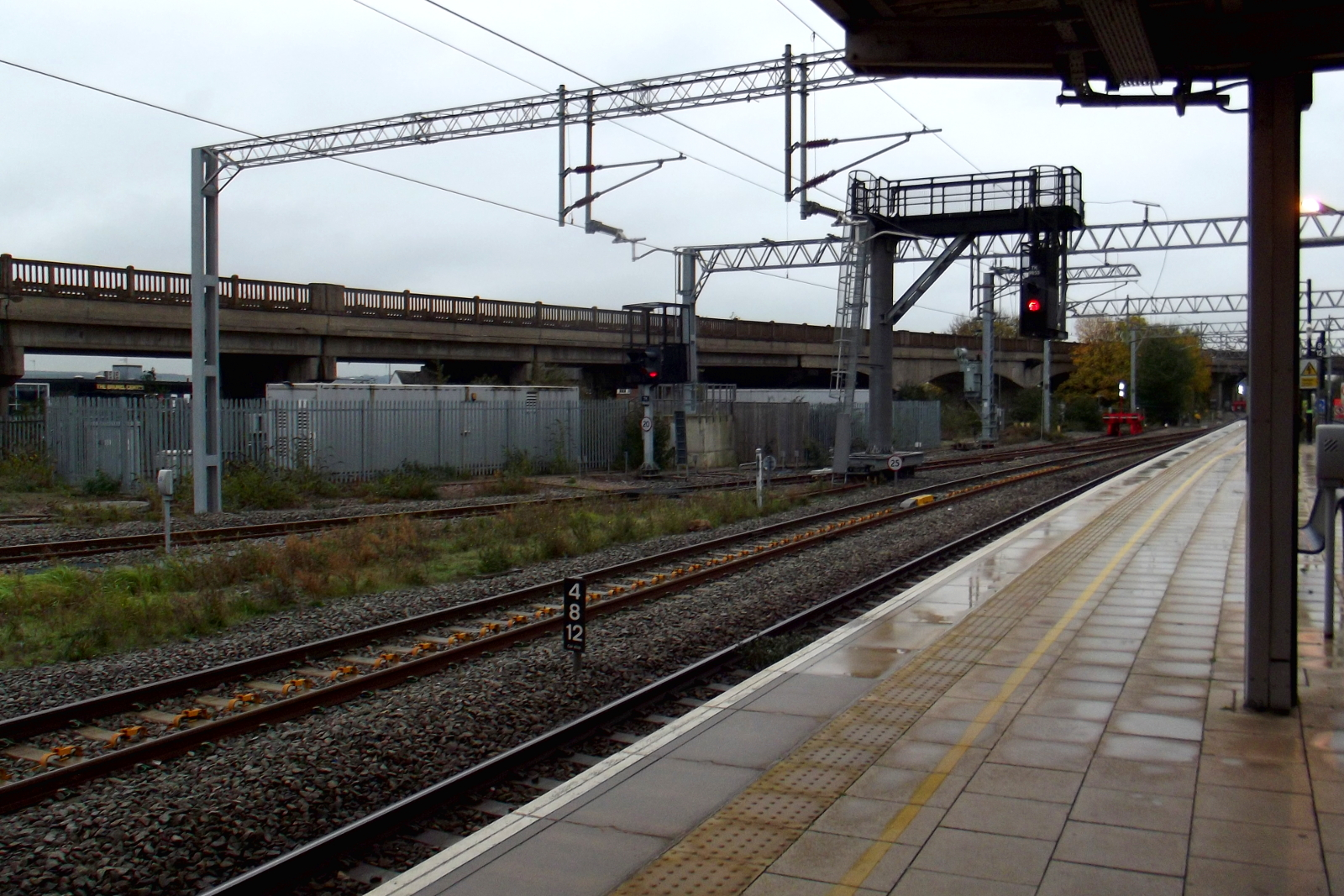
- The flyover from Bletchley railway station on 26 October 2017
- Coordinates: 51°59′32″N 0°44′7″W
- OS grid reference: SP 868 335
- Carries: Varsity line
- Crosses: West Coast Main Line
- Locale: Bletchley
- Owner: Network Rail

Characteristics
- Total length: 605 metres (1,985 ft)
- No. of spans: 37

Rail characteristics
- No. of tracks: 2
- Track gauge: 1,435 mm (4 ft 8 1/2 in)
- Electrified: No

History
- Opened: 1959
- Rebuilt: 2020–2021

The Bletchley Flyover is a railway viaduct that crosses the West Coast Main Line (WCML) just south of Bletchley railway station in Milton Keynes, England. It was originally a reinforced concrete railway viaduct that carried the former Varsity line between Oxford and Cambridge from 1959 until its closure in 1968. The flyover was retained, but largely unused until 2021, when the East West Rail Alliance partially demolished then rebuilt the structure. It reopened for engineering use in early 2022.

== Construction ==
The original structure was composed of 37 concrete spans, resting on concrete piers. It is 605 metres (1,985 ft) long. Most of the spans are beam-shaped; two are double-length arches. Electrification pads were provided when the flyover was first built, despite there being no plans to electrify the line.

== History ==
In 1959, the Bletchley Flyover was opened to carry the Varsity line over the West Coast Main Line (WCML) as part of the British Rail Modernisation Plan. The plan proposed to develop the Varsity Line as a freight link from the East Coast ports to South Wales, capable of handling up to 2,400 wagons of coal class traffic and empties daily. However, following British Railways deciding not to proceed with the Swanbourne sidings plan, the line saw little use, with most freight traffic taking other routes.

The Varsity line closed to passengers on 1 January 1968; it remained open to goods traffic until October 1993, when the bridge was mothballed. The flyover was returned to use in 2006 along with a mile of track west of Bletchley to a loop at the Newton Longville Brickworks landfill site.

== 2020/2021 rebuild ==
As part of the East West Rail project that will reopen the Oxford – Cambridge route, work to replace 14 of the spans began in April 2020. Sections beside and over the WCML were removed in April and May. The arches crossing Buckingham Road (on the east side of WCML) started being removed on 5 July 2020. "The final span was lifted out by crane in October and the last of the supporting piers and pillars were removed over the weekend of 9-10 January 2021". At the early May 2021 holiday, 103 concrete girders were lifted into place to provide the bridge deck over the main line.

During summer 2021, a new structure was built for use by East West Rail, in the form of a box tunnel around the WCML; by February 2022, 1.5 km (0.93 mi) of track had been installed over the new flyover, enabling engineering trains to reach the eastern end of the construction site.

The renovation project includes a plan to construct high level platforms for Bletchley station, just after the eastern end of the flyover. These platforms will serve East West Rail (only).
