= Chiltern Railways (1996–2026) =

British train operating company

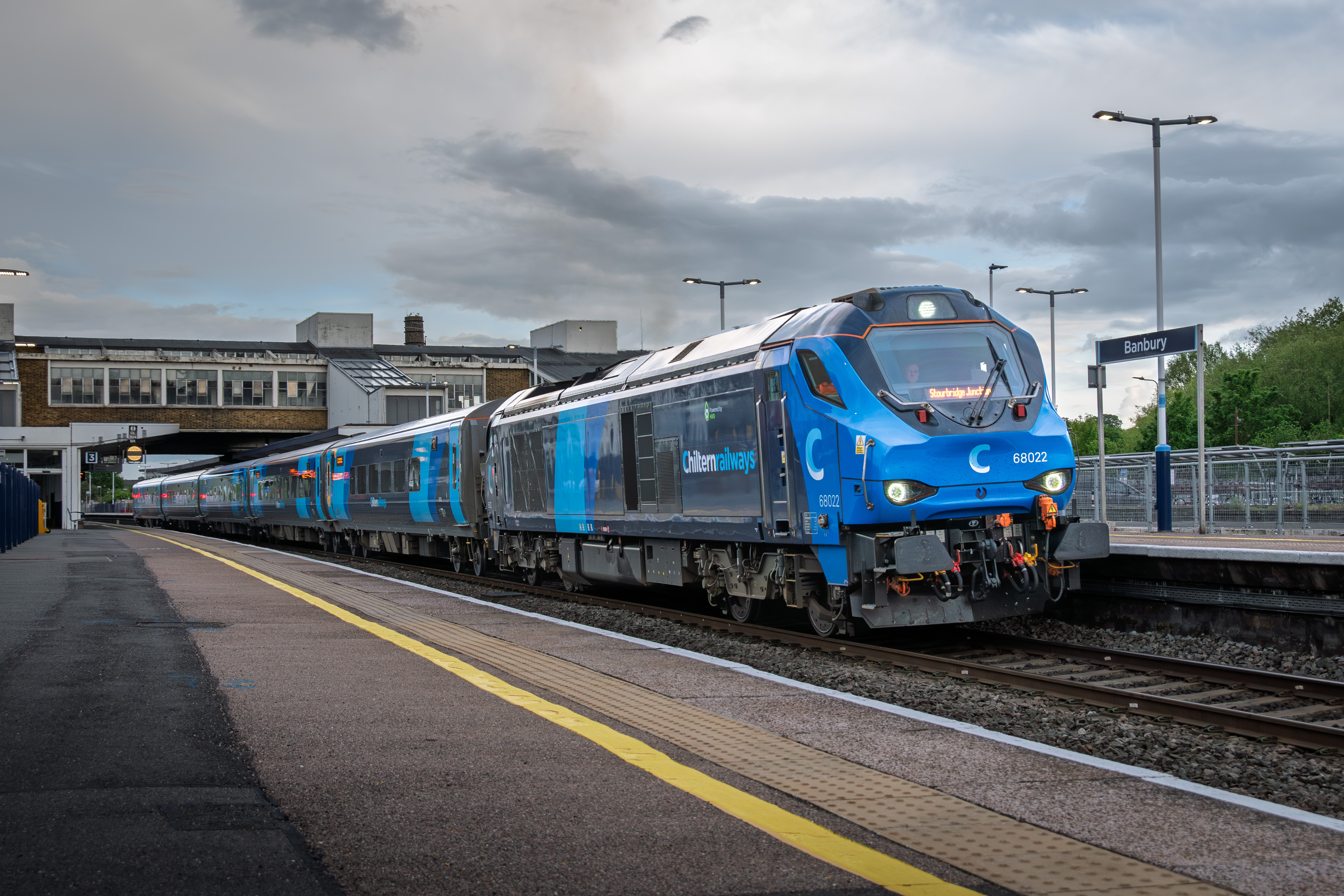
- A Chiltern Explorer set formed of a Class 68 and Mark 5A coaches at Banbury

Overview
- Franchise: Chiltern
- Main regions: Greater London; South East England; West Midlands
- Other regions: East Midlands; East of England
- Fleet: Class 68 hauling Mark 5A coaches; Class 165 Networker Turbo; Class 168 Clubman
- Stations called at: 66
- Stations operated: 32
- Parent company: Arriva UK Trains
- Reporting mark: CH
- Dates of operation: 21 July 1996–20 September 2026
- Successor: Chiltern Railways

Technical
- Length: 336.4 km (209.0 mi)

Other
- Website: www.chilternrailways.co.uk
Route map

The Chiltern Railway Company Limited, trading as Chiltern Railways, was a British train operating company that operated the Chiltern franchise from July 1996 until September 2026. It was a subsidiary of Arriva UK Trains from April 2009 until the end of its franchise.

Chiltern Railways was founded as M40 Trains by a group of ex-British Rail managers backed by John Laing and 3i; in June 1996, it was announced that M40 Trains had been awarded the Chiltern Railways franchise. On 21 July 1996, it took over operations from British Rail. The company promptly commenced the redoubling of the Chiltern Main Line under the Evergreen initiative and ordered the Class 168 Clubman diesel multiple units (DMUs) to supplement its ex-British Rail fleet. Following the awarding of a 20-year franchise to Chiltern Railways in August 2000, Evergreen phase 2 works begun to raise line speeds around Beaconsfield, built two new platforms at its London Marylebone terminus. In January 2010, a £250 million upgrade package was agreed for Evergreen phase 3, remodelling the line and permitting 100 mph (160 km/h) operations, thus greatly reducing journey times.

In August 2002, the John Laing Group became the sole owner of Chiltern Railways after buying out all other shareholders. In January 2008, shortly after John Laing's purchase by Henderson Equity Partners, the company was sold to the German publicly owned railway company Deutsche Bahn. Chiltern Railways became a subsidiary of Arriva UK Trains as a result of restructuring during early 2011. Around this time, Chiltern was considered one of the best railway operators in Britain, with Public performance measure (PPM) regularly over 90%. However, the introduction of new timetables during the 2010s was repeatedly received negatively by the travelling public. Severe disruption to Chiltern's services occurred following the collapse of Gerrards Cross Tunnel on 30 June 2005; an unplanned six week closure of the main line was forced, resulting in compensation being paid by Tesco (which planned to build a supermarket over the tunnel) to both Chiltern Railways and Network Rail.

Chiltern Railways operated commuter/regional rail passenger services from its central London terminus at Marylebone along the M40 corridor to destinations in Buckinghamshire, Oxfordshire, Northamptonshire (King's Sutton) and Warwickshire, as well as long-distance services to the West Midlands along two routes. Services on the Chiltern Main Line run from London to Birmingham Moor Street, Stratford-upon-Avon and Oxford, with some peak-hour services extended to Stourbridge Junction. Chiltern Railways also runs trains on the London–Aylesbury line to Aylesbury (some of which continue on to Aylesbury Vale Parkway), and on the Princes Risborough to Aylesbury and Oxford to Bicester branch lines. From December 2010, Chiltern began operating the Chiltern Mainline service of two peak-hour locomotive-hauled services consisting of a Class 67 hauling a rake of modernised Mark 3 coaches and a Driving Van Trailer.

Chiltern Railways returned to state ownership on 20 September 2026 as part of the establishment of Great British Railways.

== History ==
Chiltern Railways originated with a number of former British Rail managers who sought to conduct a management buyout on one of the soon-to-be-created rail franchises that would be produced as a part of the privatisation of British Rail. In April 1995, they were granted a licence by the railway regulator. However, the team recognised that they lacked the resources to successfully pursue a bid, thus they secured the backing of the infrastructure investment group John Laing and the venture capital specialist 3i.

In October 1995, M40 Trains was established; the various railway managers held a combined 51% shareholding in the business, while the John Laing Group and 3i held 26% and 23% stakes respectively. The company reportedly spent £38 million in its bid for the Chiltern Railways franchise. In June 1996, the Director of Passenger Rail Franchising awarded the franchise to M40 Trains for an initial period of seven years. It was the only franchise operator to have as many as 51% of its shares controlled by its directors.

On 21 July 1996, the company commenced operations, taking over from the publicly owned British Rail. Chiltern Railways was the first railway franchise to order new rolling stock in the post-privatisation era in the form of the Class 168 Clubman DMUs. However, their introduction was marred by unreliability, in part due to their rushed entry into service in response to booming passenger demand. By April 1999, the company claimed to employ 50% more staff than it had at the start of the franchise, and to be running 25% more services than had been operated by British Rail. Meanwhile, under the terms of the franchise agreement, the annual subsidy provided by the British government was gradually reduced.

During early 1999, the ownership of M40 Trains underwent substantial changes; the John Laing Group opted to increase its shareholding in the venture to 84% via the purchase of shares from their previous holders; the outstanding 16% of shares were owned by several members of the former British Rail management team.

In March 2000, the Shadow Strategic Rail Authority announced that both M40 Trains and the British transport group Go-Ahead had been shortlisted to bid for the next Chiltern franchise. In August 2000, M40 Trains was awarded the new franchise, which was set to run for 20 years, conditional on various investments being made across that period. On 3 March 2002, the new franchise period began.

In August 2002, John Laing acquired the remaining 16% of shares in M40 Trains that it did not already own. In September 2006, John Laing was purchased by the global investment firm Henderson Equity Partners in exchange for £887 million.

During December 2004, Chiltern Railways took over operation of passenger services on the Leamington Spa to Stratford-upon-Avon branch line from First Great Western Link. In June 2006, M40 Trains was invited by the Department for Transport (DfT) to lodge a bid to operate the Snow Hill Lines, then operated by Central Trains, as part of the letting of the West Midlands franchise. However, this bid was not successful.

During mid-2005, Chiltern Railways' services were heavily disrupted by the collapse of Gerrards Cross Tunnel. In 1996, the British retailer Tesco sought to build a supermarket near Gerrards Cross railway station; despite the local council's initial objection to the scheme, it was approved by the Deputy Prime Minister John Prescott in July 1998. Due to a lack of available space, Tesco started building a tunnel over the active railway line to provide suitable land for the development. On 30 June 2005, the partially-constructed tunnel collapsed; nobody was injured, but a complete closure of the line was enacted for over six weeks before being permitted to reopen on 20 August 2005. Tesco paid an estimated £200 million of compensation to both Chiltern Railways and Network Rail for the disruption; the retailer also pledged to fund a media campaign to win back passengers lost by the route's unplanned closure. The tunnel's construction resumed in January 2009. In late November 2010, the completed store was opened.

In July 2007, Henderson Equity Partners announced its intention to sell on Laing Rail along with the Chiltern Railways franchise. Amongst the parties to express interest in acquiring the company were the transport groups Arriva and Go-Ahead. However, by December 2007, only the German publicly owned railway company Deutsche Bahn and the Dutch transport company NedRail reportedly remained in the bidding contest. In January 2008, Laing Rail was purchased by Deutsche Bahn; accordingly Chiltern Railways became a part of the DB Regio group. During early 2011, the company was restructured, with DB Regio becoming a subsidiary of Arriva UK Trains.

During May 2011, Chiltern took over operating services on the Oxford–Bicester line from First Great Western. On 26 October 2015, the company opened two new stations, Oxford Parkway and Bicester Village, providing services between north Oxford and London Marylebone. In December 2016, Chiltern Railways started running train services from Oxford to London Marylebone.

In 2021, following the COVID-19 emergency measures, Chiltern was awarded a new direct contract by the DfT, replacing its franchise agreement, with a core term until 1 April 2025 and expiring on 12 December 2027. The end of the franchise was subsequently brought forward to 2026, with a date currently to be confirmed.

Chiltern Railways is one of several train operators impacted by the 2022–2024 United Kingdom railway strikes, the first national rail strike in the UK for three decades. Its workers were amongst those are participating in industrial action due to a dispute over pay and working conditions.

On 21 October 2024 Chiltern Railways, along with Great Western Railway began testing trains on the full route of stage 1 of East West Rail between Oxford and Milton Keynes Central, ahead of its 2025 opening. In March 2025, the DfT confirmed that Chiltern Railways would be the operator of passenger services between Oxford and Milton Keynes, to start later in 2025.

The Chiltern Railways contract came to an end on 20 September 2026, at this point, its passenger services were renationalised and transferred from the private operator, Arriva UK Trains, into state ownership under DfT Operator. This transition is part of the UK government's broader rail reform programme initiated by the Passenger Railway Services (Public Ownership) Act 2024.

== Services ==
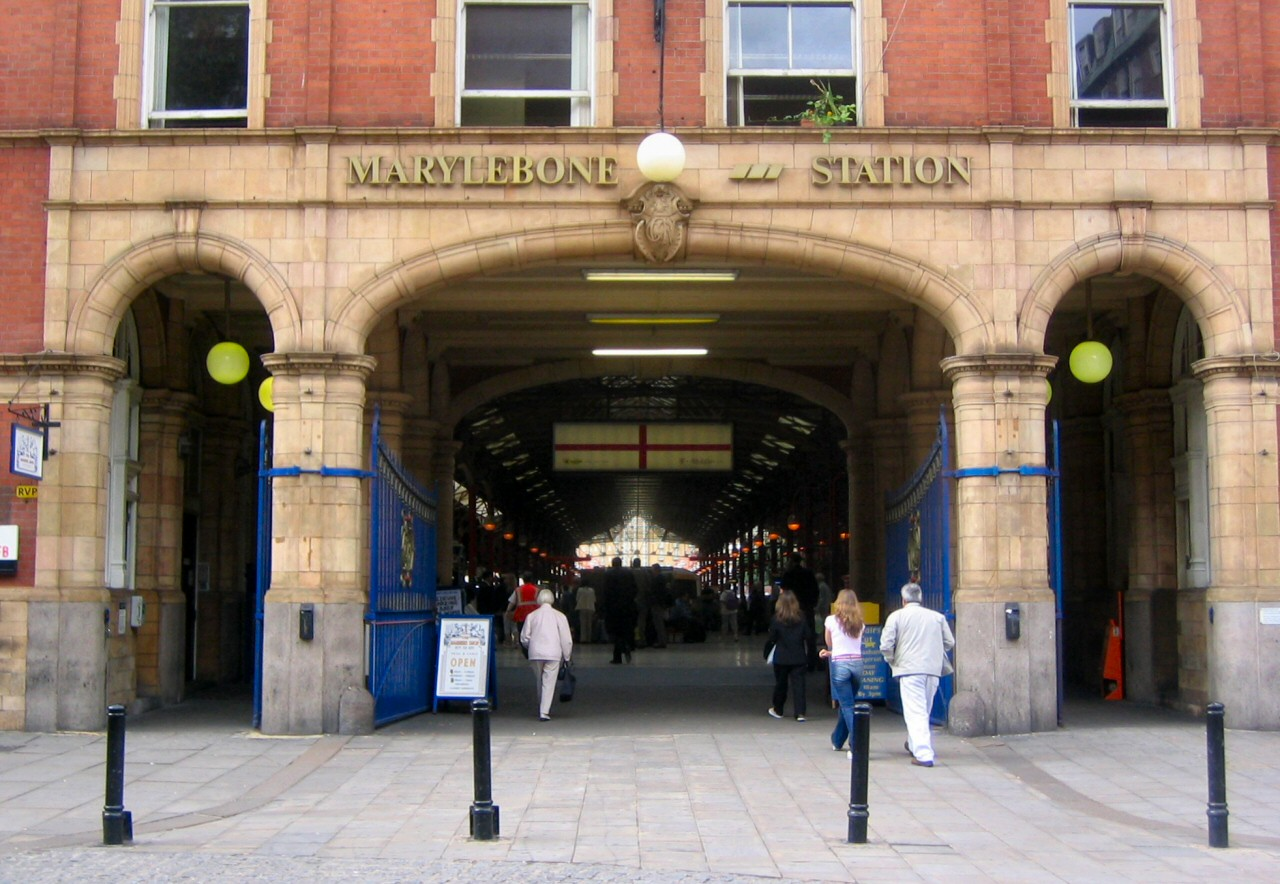
The main entrance to London Marylebone

Chiltern Railways operated regular services on five routes.

The Chiltern Main Line was the core route for the majority of Chiltern Railways services and was one of two "mainline routes" operated by the company. The route linked the major cities of London and Birmingham (Marylebone and Moor Street stations respectively), passing through the towns of High Wycombe, Banbury, Royal Leamington Spa, Warwick and Solihull. Chiltern Railways operated trains along the entire line, services ranging from stopping suburban trains (e.g. London Marylebone – Gerrards Cross) to express trains running the full length of the line between London and Birmingham. The fastest timetabled journey from Birmingham to London by this route was 99 minutes (compared with 82 minutes using Avanti West Coast services between Birmingham New Street and London Euston via the West Coast Main Line). In addition to the Chiltern Railways services, CrossCountry also operates regular services on the line north of Banbury, and West Midlands Trains operates regular services north of Dorridge.

The London–Aylesbury line is the second "mainline route" operated by the company. The route links London Marylebone with Aylesbury via Amersham. All Chiltern Railways services on this route run the full length of the line between Marylebone and Aylesbury stations and call at all stations north of Rickmansworth; most trains are extended one station further to Aylesbury Vale Parkway. Certain peak hour services skip some or all stations between Marylebone and Great Missenden. The line runs alongside London Underground's Metropolitan line between Finchley Road (just north of Marylebone station) and just Harrow-on-the-Hill, each operator running on separate tracks. Beyond Harrow-on-the-Hill, the tracks are shared between Chiltern Railways and Metropolitan line services. This is an example of National Rail services using non-Network Rail tracks, and it uses a unique unregulated track-access agreement with London Underground. Beyond Amersham (where the Metropolitan line terminates), all services are operated by Chiltern Railways only.

The other three routes that were regularly served by the company were all branch lines. The Aylesbury–Princes Risborough line linked Princes Risborough, on the Chiltern Main Line, with Aylesbury, on the London to Aylesbury Line. Most trains on the line continued beyond Princes Risborough to London Marylebone, which gave Aylesbury an alternative route to reach central London; however, a few services terminated at Princes Risborough. The Oxford–Bicester line branches off the Chiltern Main Line just south of Bicester and links the town with Oxford. The line was mostly served by express services to and from Marylebone. Until December 2016, the line terminated a few miles northeast of Oxford, at the nearby Oxford Parkway station; the line was then extended to the main Oxford station. The Leamington–Stratford line branches off the Chiltern Main Line at Hatton (a few miles west of Leamington Spa) and runs to Stratford-upon-Avon. The branch line is also operated by regular West Midlands Trains services.

As of May 2026, a simplified description of the routes that were served off-peak Monday to Friday are as follows:

Chiltern Main Line
Route	Freq.	Calling at
London Marylebone to Birmingham Moor Street	1 tph	High Wycombe; Haddenham & Thame Parkway; Bicester North; Banbury; Leamington Spa; Warwick; Warwick Parkway; Dorridge; Solihull
London Marylebone to Birmingham Snow Hill	1 tp2h	High Wycombe; Bicester North; Banbury; Leamington Spa; Warwick; Warwick Parkway; Dorridge; Solihull; Birmingham Moor Street
London Marylebone to Banbury	1 tp2h (Note: Combined with London - Birmingham Snow Hill service to form 1 tph)	High Wycombe; Bicester North; Kings Sutton
Leamington Spa to Birmingham Moor Street	1 tp2h	Warwick; Warwick Parkway; Hatton; Lapworth; Dorridge; Solihull
Oxford–Bicester line
Route	Freq.	Calling at
London Marylebone to Oxford	1 tph	Gerrards Cross; Beaconsfield; High Wycombe; Saunderton; Princes Risborough; Bicester Village; Oxford Parkway
London Marylebone to Oxford	1 tph	Wembley Stadium; Gerrards Cross; Beaconsfield; High Wycombe; Princes Risborough; Haddenham & Thame Parkway; Bicester Village; Islip (1 tp2h); Oxford Parkway
London–Aylesbury and Aylesbury–Princes Risborough lines
Route	Freq.	Calling at
London Marylebone to High Wycombe	1 tph	Wembley Stadium; Sudbury Hill Harrow; Northolt Park; South Ruislip; West Ruislip (1 tp2h); Denham; Denham Golf Club (1 tp2h); Gerrards Cross; Seer Green and Jordans; Beaconsfield; Trains either call at West Ruislip or Denham Golf Club
Princes Risborough to Aylesbury	-	Monks Risborough; Little Kimble; Trains run irregularly with either hourly or 90 minute gaps
London Marylebone to Aylesbury	1 tph (Note: Doesn't run some hours)	Harrow-on-the-Hill; Rickmansworth; Chorleywood; Chalfont & Latimer; Amersham; Great Missenden; Wendover; Stoke Mandeville
London Marylebone to Aylesbury Vale Parkway	1 tph	Harrow-on-the-Hill; Rickmansworth; Chorleywood; Chalfont & Latimer; Amersham; Great Missenden; Wendover; Stoke Mandeville; Aylesbury
Leamington–Stratford line
Route	Freq.	Calling at
Leamington Spa to Stratford-upon-Avon	1 tp2h	Warwick; Hatton; Claverdon; Bearley; Wilmcote; Stratford-upon-Avon Parkway

=== Parliamentary trains ===
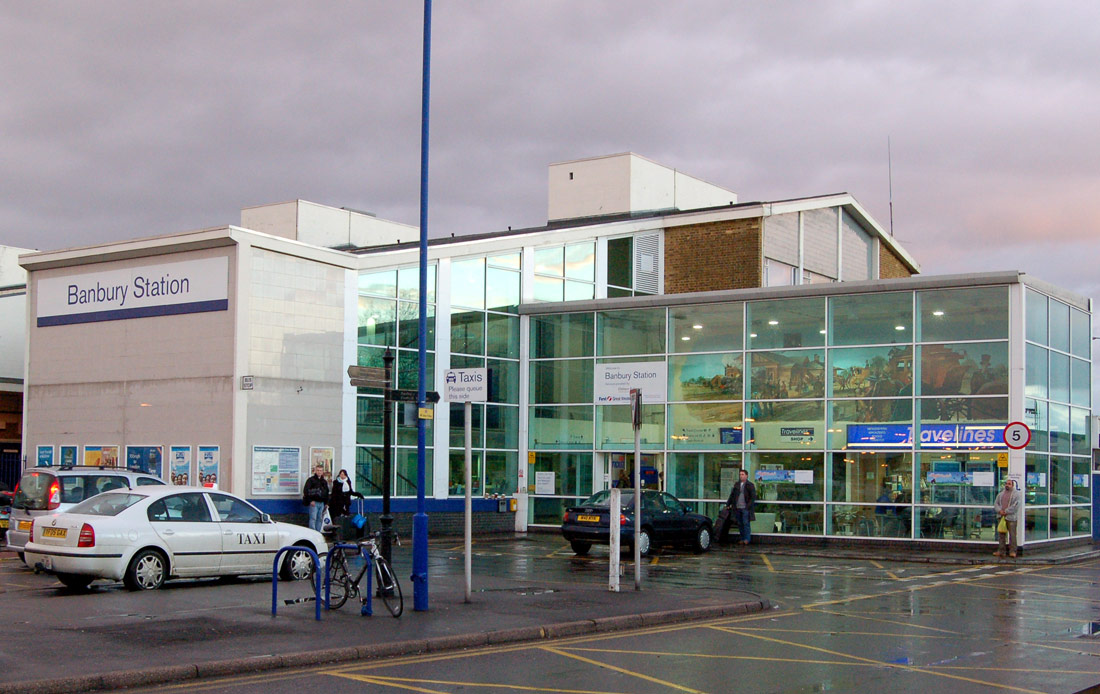
The booking hall and main entrance to Banbury

Chiltern Railways operated two parliamentary train services:

- Cherwell Valley line: there was a single daily parliamentary service operating on the Cherwell Valley line from Oxford to Banbury, operated by Chiltern Railways. This service ran on Tuesdays to Saturdays just after midnight and called at Tackley, Heyford and Kings Sutton - the three intermediate stations on the line. There is no corresponding return service heading towards Oxford. This service existed to maintain route knowledge for Chiltern Railways' drivers. Regular services on the line are operated by Great Western Railway and CrossCountry.
- New North Main line/Greenford branch line: the company also operated a weekday parliamentary service to and from West Ealing in the late morning. Until December 2018, these services ran to and from London Paddington. They were then diverted to West Ealing following closure of the easternmost section of the New North Main line for High Speed 2 construction. The parliamentary service used to run a return service, with the returning service terminating at High Wycombe. At the start of the COVID-19 pandemic, the service was suspended until December 2021. As of December 2022, the service no longer runs and has been replaced by a bus service.

=== Buckinghamshire Railway Centre ===
On certain Bank Holiday Mondays, services are extended from Aylesbury to the Buckinghamshire Railway Heritage Centre facilities at Quainton Road, a short way north of Aylesbury Vale Parkway. However, this did not happen in 2019 and their future is uncertain. The link will continue to be used by freight services to Calvert.

== Tickets ==
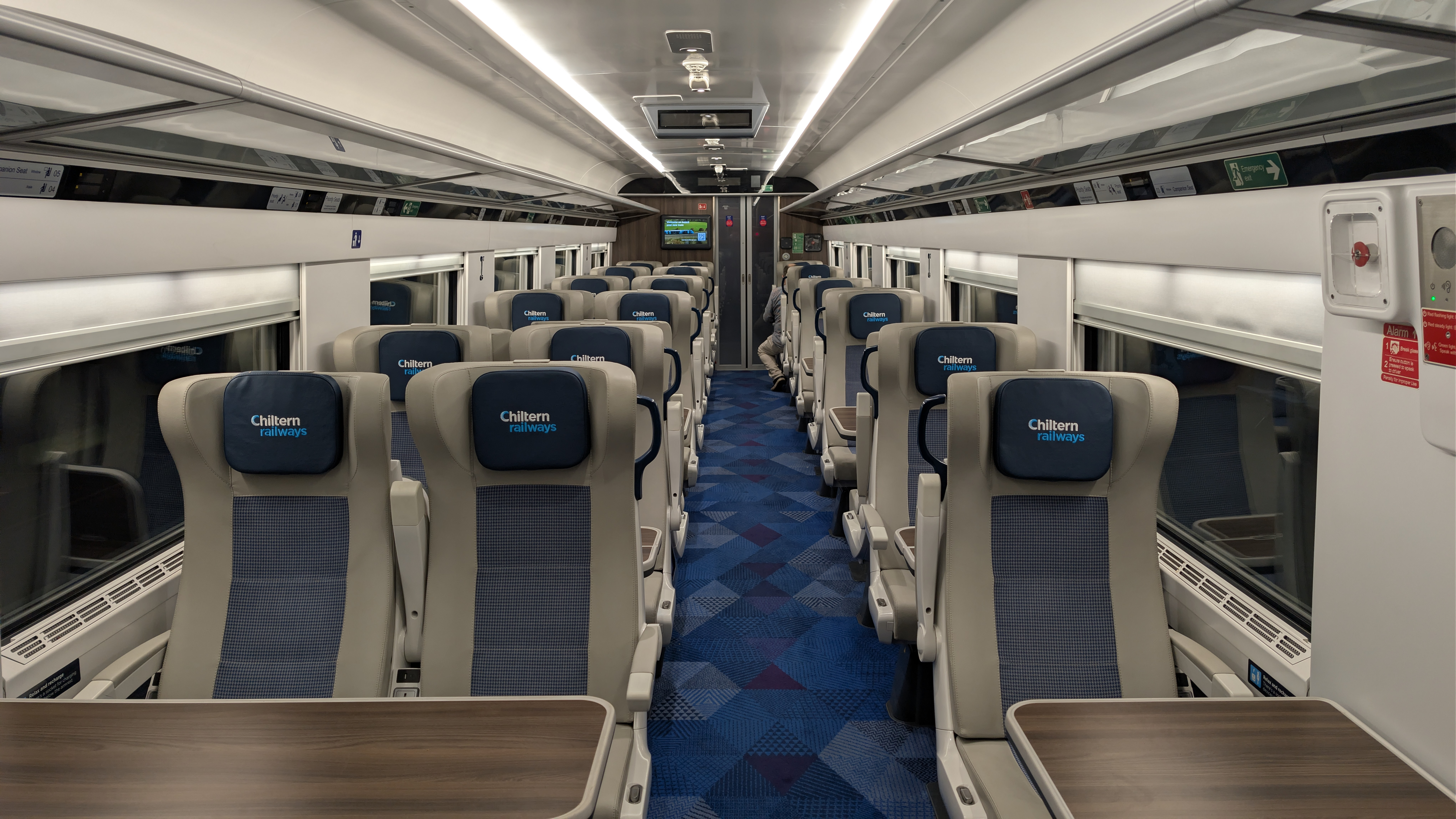
The interior of a Chiltern Railways Mark 5A first class carriage.

Since winning the franchise, Chiltern introduced "Route: High Wycombe" tickets for the Chiltern route between Birmingham and London that are considerably cheaper than "Route: Any Permitted" tickets, valid on the faster Avanti West Coast service to London Euston as well a number of other operators and routes. Chiltern offers only standard class, not standard and First Class as on Avanti services.

Until January 2022, Chiltern offered a premium economy "Business Zone" carriage on their Class 68 loco-hauled services between Birmingham or Oxford and London. Passengers would pay an upgrade fee to sit in a larger first-class-style seat; and formerly, this upgrade came with complimentary refreshments but, since May 2017, refreshment services have been cut on all Chiltern Railways services, meaning the "Business Zone" no longer comes with complimentary refreshments.

From January 2022, Business Zone is no longer offered, and the former Business Zone carriage can be used by any customers holding a valid ticket to travel at no extra cost.

== Performance ==
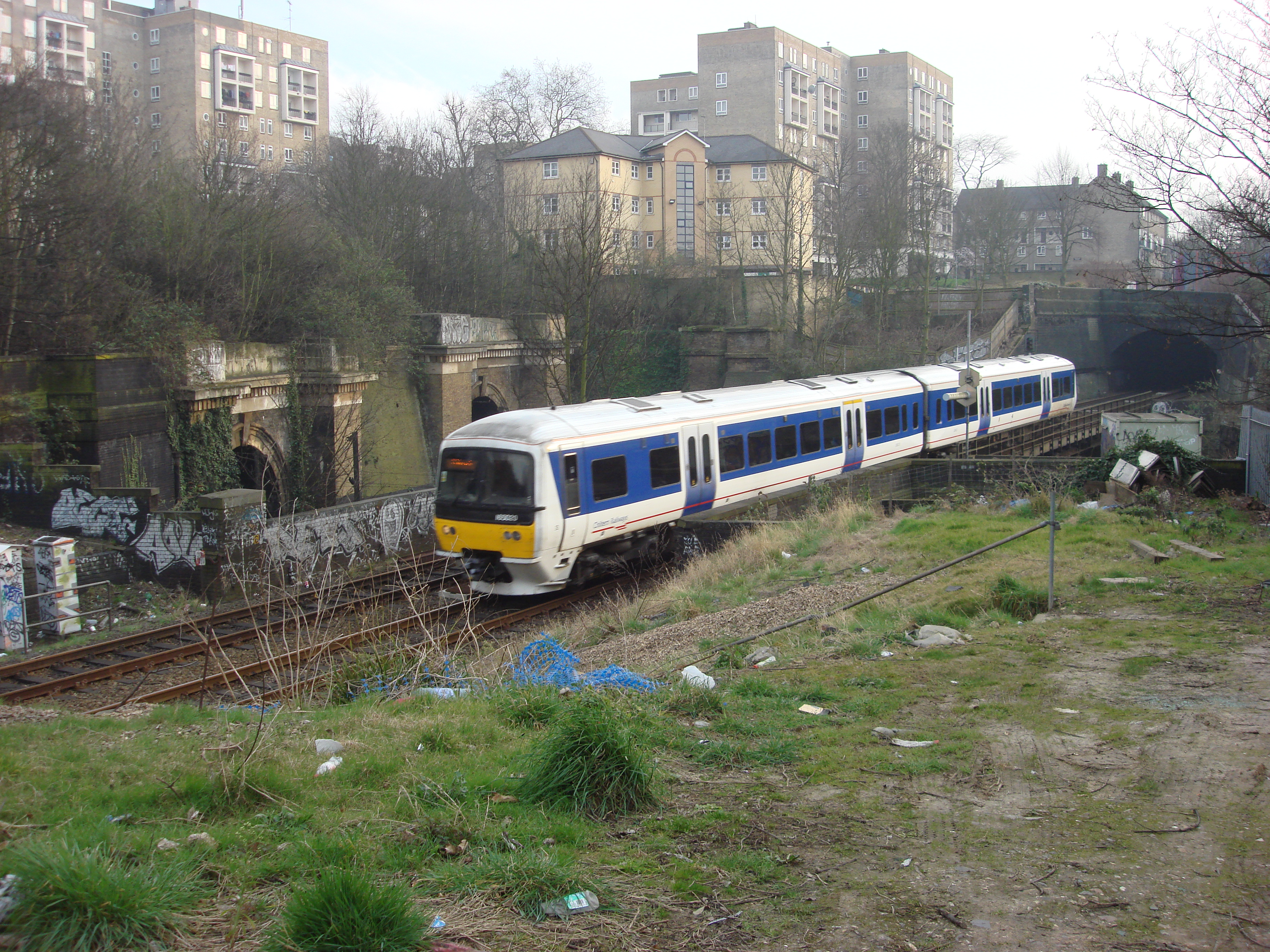
A refurbished Class 165 DMU unit near South Hampstead

Chiltern Railways' early operations were subject to considerable criticism. During 1998, its poor performance figures in criteria such as reliability, punctuality, and customer approval has led to financial penalties being incurred by the company, some of which was in the form of refunds to its passengers.

By the mid-2010s, Chiltern was considered one of the best railway operators in Britain, with Public Performance Measure (PPM) regularly over 90%, until the introduction of changes in November 2015, and infrastructure issues saw punctuality fall to 86% in December 2015. Chiltern's PPM is measured on stricter conditions than its long-distance rivals, such as Avanti West Coast, as Chiltern has a five-minute window for performance while others have a ten-minute window.

Performance figures published by Network Rail rate Chiltern Railways sixth in train operating companies in the UK at 89.4% (PPM – period 9) and 94.3% (MAA) for the year to 12 December 2015.

A new timetable introduced in September 2011, combined with significant disruption caused by engineering work, caused a negative reaction from customers. A petition to have the service reviewed was started, and articles describing the disrupted journeys of commuters appeared in the local press. A new timetable introduced in December 2012 also met with frustration and opposition from some customers, particularly those using Saunderton and Princes Risborough stations.

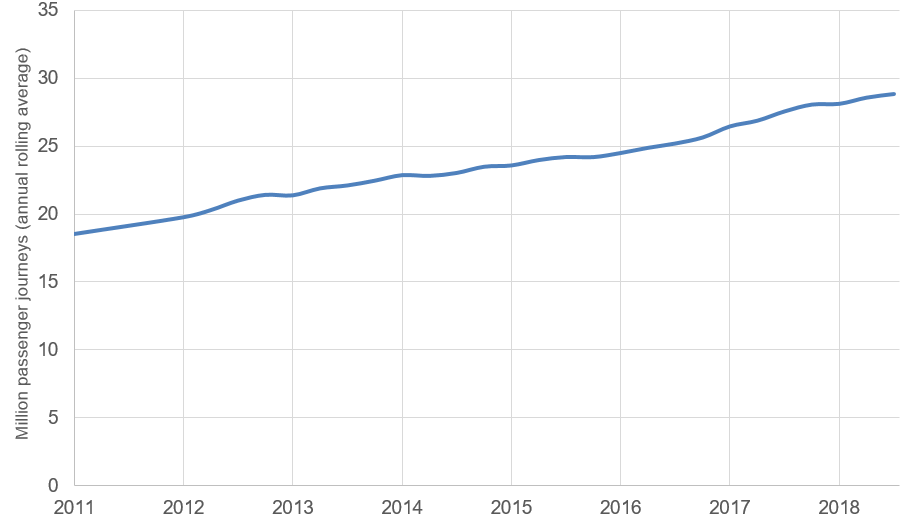
Chiltern passenger numbers in millions (annual rolling average) 2010/11-2018/19 Q1.

== Project Evergreen ==
Evergreen was the name given by Chiltern to the major infrastructure works that the company has committed to over the 20-year duration of its franchise to improve routes and services. This has been divided into three distinct phases.

=== Evergreen 1 ===
The main focus of phase 1 was the redoubling of the Chiltern Main Line between Princes Risborough and Bicester North, with work taking place during 1998, as well as between Bicester North and Aynho Junction during 2001. Furthermore, several stations were subject to reconstruction works. Haddenham and Thame Parkway was rebuilt to have two operational platforms instead of a single platform; a new platform was also installed at Princes Risborough. Finally, the line speed limit was raised following appropriate infrastructure improvements.

=== Evergreen 2 ===
Phase 2 commenced shortly following the award of Chiltern's 20-year franchise period in August 2000. The most extensive works undertaken was the realignment of the route through Beaconsfield, which permitted line speeds to be increased to 75 mph (121 km/h). Further improvements in this phase included the enactment of signalling improvements between High Wycombe and Bicester, as well as between Princes Risborough and Aylesbury, two new platforms were constructed at London Marylebone on land formerly occupied by the carriage sidings, while a new depot was constructed at Wembley.

=== Evergreen 3 ===
The DfT, Chiltern Railways and Network Rail agreed in January 2010 to a £250 million upgrade of the Chiltern Main Line.

==== Phase 1 ====
Phase 1 of the project, now complete, involved upgrading the Marylebone – Birmingham Chiltern Main Line to permit 100 mph (160 km/h) running on an additional 50 miles (80 km) of route. Junctions at Neasden, Northolt and Aynho were remodelled to permit higher speeds. The 'up' through track has been restored at Princes Risborough, the existing 'up' line becoming a platform loop, a new turnback siding has been provided at Gerrards Cross, and a new, straighter 'down' through track built from Northolt Junction (where the original layout favoured the now little-used Paddington route) to Ruislip Gardens. The existing 'down' track continues to serve South Ruislip station. The former speed restrictions through Bicester North have been removed to permit 100 mph running. Two additional terminating platforms at Birmingham Moor Street were reopened in December 2010. Accelerated services were initially planned to start in May 2011, but there were delays and it was not until 5 September 2011 that Chiltern was able to introduce a new timetable to take advantage of the improvements.

As a result of the speed increases, journey times have been reduced significantly. From Marylebone, the fastest peak-hour journey time to Birmingham Moor Street is now 90 minutes, instead of 117 minutes previously. Chiltern Railways former chairman Adrian Shooter stated: "This is the biggest passenger rail project for several generations not to call on the taxpayer for support. Working closely with Network Rail, we are going to create a new main-line railway for the people of Oxfordshire and the Midlands. This deal demonstrates that real improvements to rail services can be paid for without public subsidy by attracting people out of their cars and on to trains."

The table below outlines the peak timetable improvements.

Fastest Peak Time from London (minutes)
	Previous time	Post Phase 1 time
Gerrards Cross	21	18
High Wycombe	34	23
Princes Risborough	41	32
Bicester	56	44
Banbury	63	50
Leamington Spa	85	67
Solihull	107	84
Birmingham (Moor Street)	117	92

==== Phase 2 ====
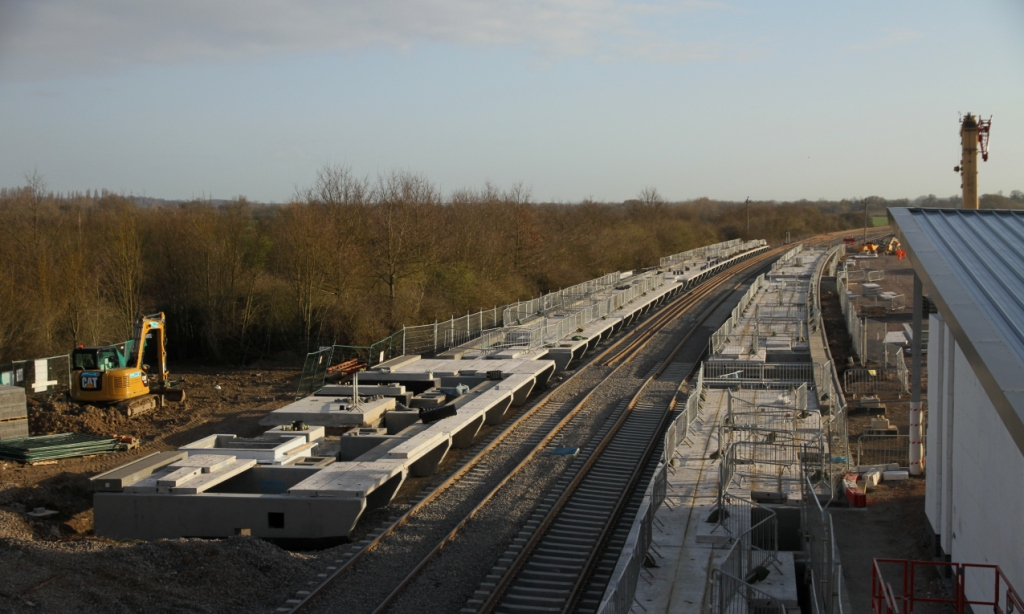
Construction of Oxford Parkway station in 2015

During October 2012, the Secretary of State for Transport granted permission for work to begin on Phase 2 of the Evergreen 3 project, with services between London Marylebone and Oxford. Under Phase 2, a quarter-of-a-mile double track has been constructed joining the Oxford–Bicester line at Bicester Village to the Chiltern Main Line, allowing a new Oxford to London Marylebone service to operate. A new station, Oxford Parkway, has been constructed at Water Eaton; the service between Oxford Parkway and London started on 26 October 2015, with the link from Oxford Parkway to Oxford becoming operational on 12 December 2016. All signalling on the route (including the new platforms at Oxford) is controlled by the Marylebone Signalling Centre.

As part of Phase 2, the Oxford to Bicester Village service transferred from First Great Western to Chiltern in May 2011. Part of the line between Wolvercote Tunnel (on the outskirts of Oxford) and Bicester Village was restored to double track, and the scheme included additional platforms at Oxford, Islip and Bicester Village.

Network Rail provided the capital for the upgrade and will recover this through a facility charge over the subsequent 30 years, initially payable by Chiltern until its franchise expires, and then by the next franchisee. The infrastructure upgrade was carried out by main contractor BAM Nuttall, in partnership with Jarvis and WS Atkins.

Oxfordshire County Council supported the scheme, but required convincing of the benefits of the new Oxford Parkway station at Water Eaton, which is in the Green Belt. In November 2011, there was a further setback to the project when a planning inspector withheld approval due to the discovery of bats roosting in Wolvercote Tunnel. Great crested newts also had a breeding habitat close to the route. In early 2012, the "bat problem" was apparently resolved.

=== Post-Evergreen plans ===
In addition to the completed Evergreen initiatives, other potential enhancements for Chiltern's route have been discussed, but had not progressed as of the end of 2017. These include:

- Upgrading the Acton–Northolt line (formerly the "New North Main Line") to new platforms at Old Oak Common. This upgrade will also extend to London Paddington to increase capacity on the Chiltern Main Line as there is no room to expand the station at Marylebone.
- Restoration of fast through lines at Beaconsfield as part of a longer-term aspiration for a 90-minute journey time between London and Birmingham.
- Remodelling Banbury Station and tracks.
- Building of the West Hampstead interchange to allow easy interchange with the London Overground - North London Line, Jubilee line, Metropolitan line and Thameslink services.
- New Chiltern Metro Service that would operate more than four trains per hour for Wembley Stadium, Sudbury & Harrow Road, Sudbury Hill Harrow, Northolt Park, South Ruislip and West Ruislip. This would require a reversing facility at West Ruislip, passing loops at Sudbury Hill Harrow, and a passing loop at Wembley Stadium (part of the old down fast line is in use as a central reversing siding, for stock movements and additionally for eight-car football shuttles to convey passengers to the stadium for events). This 'Chiltern Metro' service was not programmed into the last round of franchising agreements.
- Re-opening the passenger line between Oxford and Bedford as part of the East West Rail project, and from Aylesbury to East West Rail at Claydon LNE Junction to provide a route to Milton Keynes and the West Coast Main Line via Bletchley. Two miles of the line north of Aylesbury re-opened on 14 December 2008, terminating at a new station, Aylesbury Vale Parkway. However, during late 2017, the Government announced that the private company, East West Rail Company, had been formed to build and operate the line exclusively. (That decision was subsequently overturned, see below).
- Opening a rail line from Aylesbury to an M6-M1 Parkway Station near Rugby.
- Extending Oyster Pay-as-you-go to High Wycombe and Aylesbury. Extension of Contactless to High Wycombe took place in June 2024 and a further extension to Aylesbury and Aylesbury Vale Parkway took place on 14 December 2025.

=== East West Rail ===
In March 2025, Chiltern announced that it had been appointed to operate passenger services on East West Rail between Oxford and Milton Keynes Central (via Oxford Parkway, Bicester Village, Winslow (newly constructed) and Bletchley stations). Chiltern expected the service to become operational in late 2025 but, as of September 2025, a dispute with the rail unions (over a proposal for driver-only operation) continues to prevent commencement of the service.

== Rolling stock ==
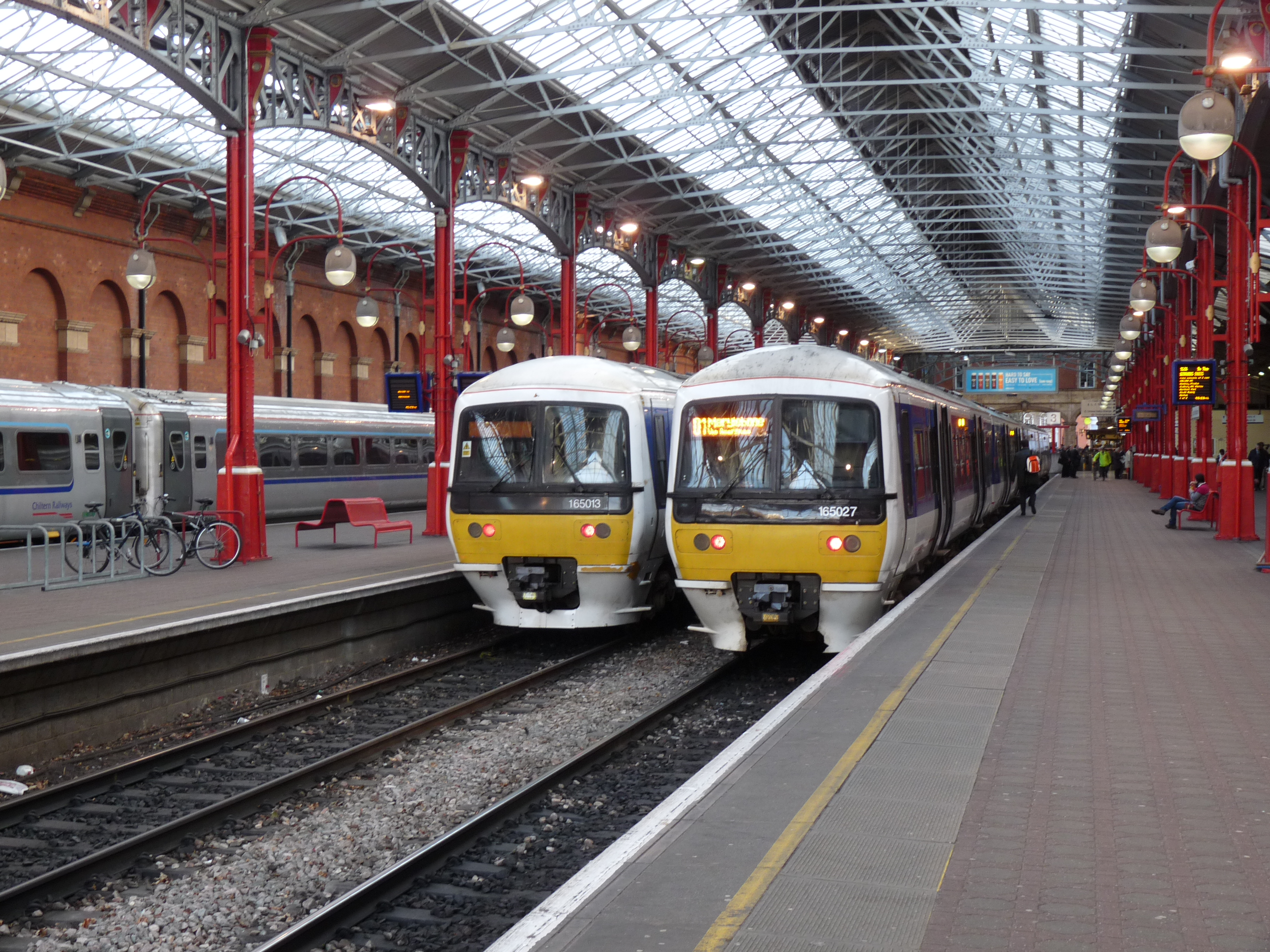
Class 165 Networker Turbos at Chiltern Railways' main London terminus, Marylebone

Chiltern Railways inherited a fleet of 34 Class 165 Turbo diesel multiple units (DMUs) from British Rail. From the franchise's onset in July 1996, the company publicly promised to introduce new rolling stock. During December 2004, a further five Class 165s were transferred from First Great Western Link. Between 2003 and 2005, all 39 Class 165s were overhauled by Bombardier at Ilford EMU Depot; during this work, air conditioning units were installed throughout the fleet, while the hopper opening windows were removed; a first-class seating area was also implemented. As the fleet had been designed for suburban use, rather than InterCity travel, the Class 165s tend to be concentrated on services to Aylesbury and Banbury, although this stock can also be found operating the service between Birmingham and Leamington Spa.

During April 2003, Chiltern restored a single Class 121 Bubble Car for use on the Aylesbury to Princes Risborough shuttles. In May 2011, a second Class 121 followed after being overhauled at Tyseley TMD. During March 2013, a third Class 121 (121032) was acquired from Arriva Trains Wales for use as a spare parts donor. On 19 May 2017, the Chiltern Bubble cars ran for the last time, as their age made spare parts increasingly difficult to obtain.

In January 2008, Chiltern ordered four two-coach Class 172 Turbostars; these entered service during June 2011. Because they cannot be fitted with the tripcock safety equipment necessary to operate on London Underground lines, none of the Class 172s can operate via Amersham unless attached to a Class 165 or Class 168 DMU. Although initially intended for use on all-stations services out of London, they frequently operated as far afield as Birmingham. During mid-2021, all of Chiltern's Class 172s were leased to West Midlands Trains for use with their existing Class 172 fleet pending the delivery of Class 196 DMUs. In December 2021, it was later announced that the Class 172/1 fleet would not be returning to Chiltern once the Class 196s enter service with WMT.

Starting in December 2010, Chiltern began operating two peak-hour loco-hauled services consisting of a Class 67 diesel locomotive hauling a rake of Mark 3 coaches and a Driving Van Trailer. A single set was initially hired from fellow DB Regio subsidiary Wrexham & Shropshire to operate a Birmingham Moor Street to London Marylebone service while another was made up of some DB-Regio-owned Mark 3s painted in British Rail blue/grey and Virgin Trains livery and operated from Banbury to London Marylebone.

After Wrexham & Shropshire ceased operations in January 2011, Chiltern started using a second ex-Wrexham & Shropshire set from May 2011. For the introduction of Chiltern's new timetable in September 2011, these sets had a Mainline logo and blue stripes added to their silver livery.

During 2012, the ex-Wrexham & Shropshire Mark 3 coaches were overhauled and fitted with sliding plug doors (similar to those fitted to South West Trains' Class 444 Desiros) and toilet retention tanks by Wabtec's Doncaster Works. Once this work was completed, a further ten Mark 3s were overhauled by Wabtec to create a fifth set and to extend the existing sets up to six coaches. In 2012, the DB-Regio-owned Mark 3s used on the peak-hour Banbury service were given a light overhaul at LNWR, Bristol, and the Virgin-liveried examples repainted into British Rail blue/grey. To allow Class 168s to be cascaded to the new Oxford services as part of Evergreen 3, more Mark 3s are to be returned to service in the future.

Between 2015 and 2016, Class 170 Turbostars with First TransPennine Express transferred to Chiltern Railways. Chiltern took five of the First TransPennine Class 170s from May 2015 and the remaining four in July 2016. Upon delivery, the Class 170s were modified to allow them to be used with Chiltern's existing Class 168s, and reclassified as Class 168/3s.

In early 2014, Chiltern Railways agreed a sub-lease from Direct Rail Services (DRS) for six Class 68 locomotives for use on its London Marylebone to Birmingham service to replace the existing fleet of Class 67s. Maintenance and commissioning for the new fleet is assisted by DRS.

During 2017, Chiltern Railways entered into an agreement with Artemis Intelligent Power and the Rail Safety and Standards Board to provide one of its redundant DVTs as a donor vehicle for conversion into a new type of diesel locomotive.

In July 2021, Chiltern Railways converted a single Class 168 unit (168329) into a Battery Hybrid train, referred to as "HybridFlex"; during February 2022, it was first run on services between London and Aylesbury. The company promoted the HybridFlex as increasing acceleration while reducing fuel consumption, vibration, and noise emissions, along with lessening the environmental impact of rail travel.

In August 2023, Chiltern Railways issued a tender for new trains.

In October 2024, the first of newly refurbished Class 168 units ran in passenger service for the first time. This £12 million refurbishment, which will carry on for the full fleet during 2025, includes a heavy maintenance baseline including battery and air system overhauls, repainting the exterior of the units, upgrading the interior passenger environment, a new Wi-Fi system, installation of USB charging sockets, improvements to the fleet's reliability, an overhaul of the heating and cooling system, new seat cushions and covers, new carpets, and new lighting.

In March 2025, Chiltern Railways announced that they will be the Passenger Operators of the East West Rail line service between Oxford and Milton Keynes Central. The service will employ Class 196 trains.

In August 2025, following an invitation to tender in July 2025 for replacement rolling stock, the company placed a leasing order with Beacon Rail for its Mark 5A fleet. This also includes the Class 68 sets previously used by TransPennine Express. The carriages will replace the fleet of Mark 3 coaching stock. The first Mark 5A coaches entered service on 26 January 2026 under new "Chiltern Explorer" branding.

=== Fleet at end of franchise ===
Family	Class	Image	Type	Top speed		Number	Carriages	Routes operated	Built
Family	Class	Image	Type	mph	km/h	Number	Carriages	Routes operated	Built
Networker	Class 165/0 Networker Turbo		DMU	75	120	28	2	All Chiltern Railways services (apart from Chiltern Main Line services)	1990–1992
Networker	Class 165/0 Networker Turbo		DMU	75	120	11	3	All Chiltern Railways services (apart from Chiltern Main Line services)	1990–1992
Bombardier Turbostar	Class 168 Clubman		DMU	100	160	5	4	Chiltern Main Line and some local services	1998
Bombardier Turbostar	Class 168 Clubman		DMU	100	160	6	3	Chiltern Main Line and some local services	2000
Bombardier Turbostar	Class 168 Clubman		DMU	100	160	2	4	Chiltern Main Line and some local services	2000
Bombardier Turbostar	Class 168 Clubman		DMU	100	160	3	3	Chiltern Main Line and some local services	2004
Bombardier Turbostar	Class 168 Clubman		DMU	100	160	3	4	Chiltern Main Line and some local services	2004
Bombardier Turbostar	Class 168 Clubman		DMU	100	160	9	2	Chiltern Main Line and some local services	2000
Stadler UKLight	Class 68		Diesel-electric locomotive	100	160	8	N/A	Chiltern Explorer services on the Chiltern Main Line	2014
CAF	Mark 5A Chiltern Explorer		Coach	125	200	52	5	Chiltern Explorer services on the Chiltern Main Line	2017-2018
CAF	Mark 5A Chiltern Explorer		Driving Trailer	125	200	14	5	Chiltern Explorer services on the Chiltern Main Line	2017-2018

=== Past fleet ===
Former train types operated by Chiltern Railways include:

Class	Image	Type	Top speed		Qty.	Carriages	Routes operated	Built	Withdrawn
Class	Image	Type	mph	km/h	Qty.	Carriages	Routes operated	Built	Withdrawn
Class 67		Diesel locomotive	125	200	5	N/A	Chiltern Main Line services	1999–2000	December 2014
Class 121		DMU	70	112	2	1	Aylesbury–Princes Risborough	1959–60	19 May 2017
Class 172/1		DMU	100	160	4	2	All Chiltern Railways services (apart from London-Aylesbury via Amersham line)	2011	May 2021
Mark 3		Passenger carriage	125	200	25	6	Chiltern Main Line services	1975–1988	February 2026
Driving Van Trailer		Control car	125	200	6	N/A	Chiltern Main Line services	1988	February 2026

== See also ==
- London Midland
- Varsity Line

Preceded by Network SouthEast; As part of British Rail	Operator of Chiltern franchise 1996–2026	Succeeded by Chiltern Railways
