= Oxford–Bicester line =

Railway line in England

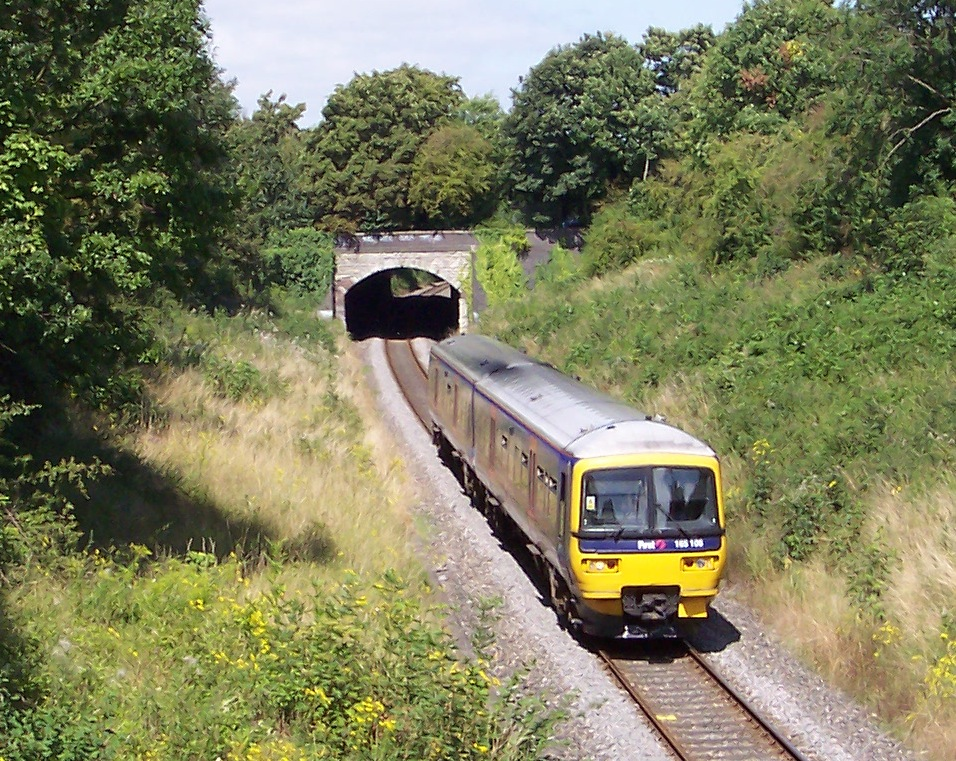
- A Class 165 DMU leaves Wolvercote Tunnel, heading towards Oxford.

Overview
- Status: Operational
- Owner: Network Rail
- Locale: Oxfordshire; South East England
- Stations: 3

Service
- Type: Heavy rail
- System: National Rail
- Services: 1
- Operator: Chiltern Railways

History
- Opened: 1850

Technical
- Number of tracks: Two
- Character: Rural
- Track gauge: 1,435 mm (4 ft 8 1/2 in) standard gauge
- Operating speed: 100 mph (160 km/h)
Route map
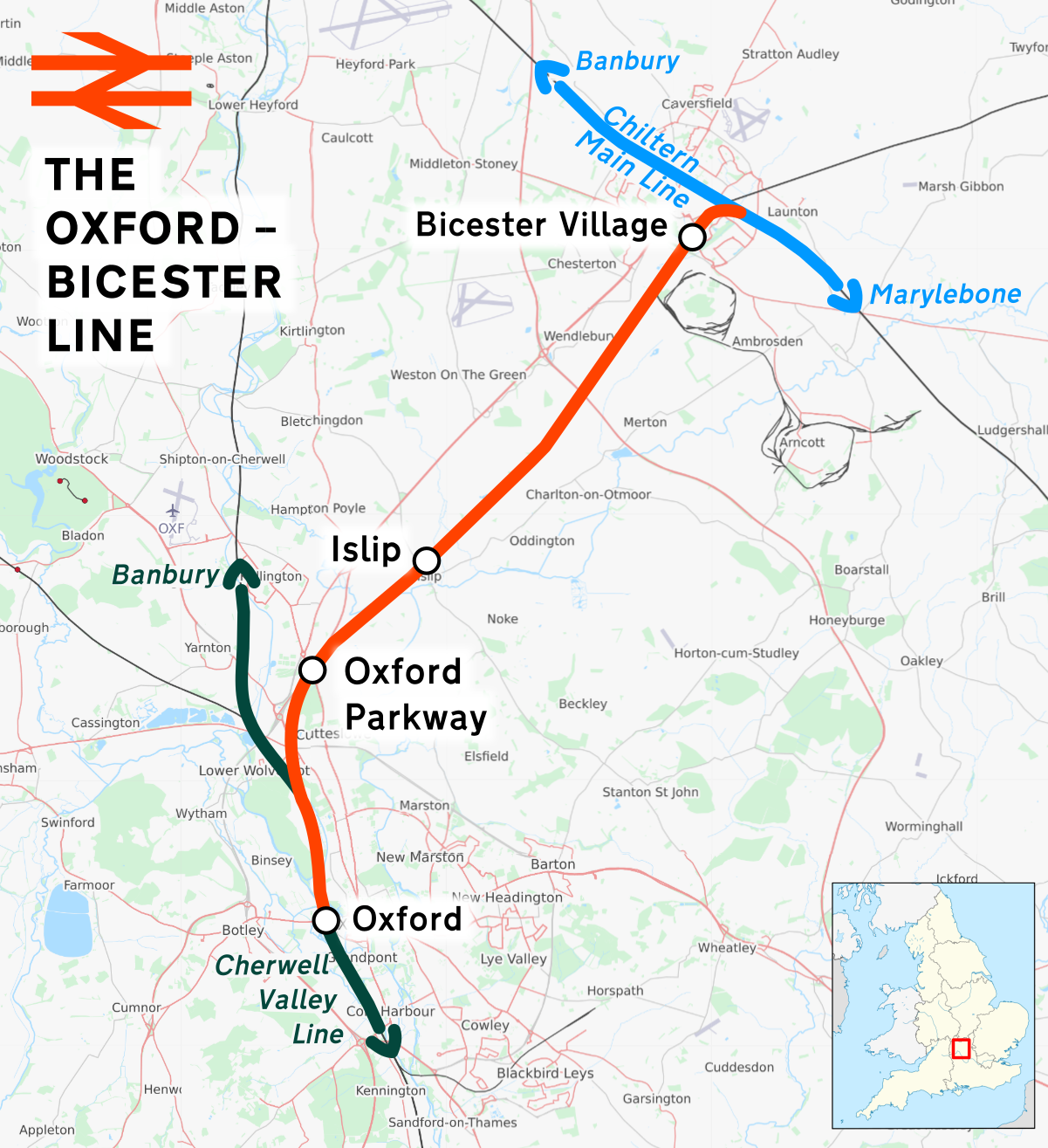
(Click to expand)

The Oxford–Bicester line is a railway line linking Oxford and Bicester in Oxfordshire, England. Opened in 1850, later becoming part of a through route to Cambridge, it closed in 1967 along with much of the rest of the original line. The section between Oxford and Bicester was reopened in 1987 as a branch line, and closed from early 2014 to late 2015 for a substantial upgrade in which it became part of a new route between Oxford and London Marylebone via High Wycombe. In June 2025, the original route eastwards was restored as far as Bletchley, with freight services regularly using the route since then. This potentially allows passenger services to run between Oxford and Bedford. (Note: As of March 2026, an industrial dispute has prevented operation of a scheduled passenger service, see East West Rail for details.) This East West Rail project includes a (funded) plan to re-establish the entire route between Oxford and Cambridge.

== History ==
=== Opening and original operation ===
The line was opened in 1850 as the Oxford and Bletchley Junction Railway (which, along with the rest of the Buckinghamshire Railway, became part of the London and North Western Railway in 1879). In the grouping of Britain's railways in 1923 the L&NWR became part of the London, Midland and Scottish Railway and, in the nationalisation of Britain's railways in 1948 the LMS became part of British Railways. Both the LMS and BR ran passenger services between Oxford and Cambridge via the Buckinghamshire Railway's Marston Vale line and the Bedford and Cambridge Railway. This led to the Oxford–Cambridge route being informally called the Varsity line.

=== 20th-century closure and reopening ===
In 1967 British Railways withdrew Oxford – Cambridge services and closed the section of line between Oxford and Bletchley. In 1987, Network SouthEast restored passenger services on the Oxford – Bicester Town section, on the initiative of Oxfordshire County Council. In 1988, Network SouthEast rebuilt and reopened Islip station, again with Oxfordshire County Council support.

Since 2005, an enhanced service including Sunday services has run during the weeks before Christmas, mainly for the Bicester Village Shopping Centre adjacent to Bicester Village Station (formerly Bicester Town station).

In May 2009, a partnership between First Great Western and Oxfordshire County Council rebranded and relaunched the line as The Bicester Link. On 22 May 2011, Chiltern Railways took over all passenger operations on the line. The line closed for upgrades in February 2014, instead running a replacement bus service about 15 times a day.

=== Evergreen 3 ===
In August 2008, Chiltern Railways announced Project Evergreen 3 to create a new passenger service between Oxford and London Marylebone via High Wycombe by 2012. As part of this project Chiltern Railways would double most of the line, build a new Oxford Parkway passenger station at Water Eaton to serve Kidlington and north Oxford and build the short 'missing-link' from Bicester Town (now Bicester Village), station to the Chiltern Main Line. This was to give Oxford an alternative to Great Western Railway's rail link to London Paddington and provide Oxford with a direct rail-link to High Wycombe for the first time since British Railways closed the Princes Risborough - Oxford section of the Wycombe Railway in 1964.

Work on Evergreen 3 commenced with the closing of the line in February 2014. The works included complete reconstruction of the line to modern standards, with new track, signalling and bridges, and the infrastructure improvements ready for 'East West Rail' services (see below). The line was double tracked from Oxford North Junction to Bicester South Junction, upgraded for 100 mph (160 km/h) operation and prepared for electrification. Between Oxford station and Oxford North Junction the line uses the former 'Jericho' line, bi-directionally. A new 1 km chord has also been built at Bicester (from Bicester Gavray Junction, linking with the Chiltern main line at Bicester South Junction) and 37 level crossings have been eliminated.

Chiltern Railways commenced driver training on the upgraded line in September 2015, and the line between the new Oxford Parkway and Bicester Village stations reopened on 26 October 2015, with two trains per hour running between London Marylebone and Oxford Parkway. It was originally planned these would be extended to Oxford in March 2016, but services to Oxford started on 11 December 2016. Planning permission for the work at Oxford Station allowing the new platforms to be constructed was given on 1 December 2015.

== Current services ==
Chiltern Railways reopened the line between the new Oxford Parkway station and Bicester on 26 October 2015. The timetable for December 2015 to May 2016 has two trains per hour between Oxford Parkway and London Marylebone, all of which stop at Bicester Village but only a few at Islip. The fastest trains are scheduled to take just under an hour for the whole journey. Services along the full lengths of the line from Oxford started on 11 December 2016. (The service received its ceremonial opening on the following day.) Chiltern Railways originally proposed that the journey from Oxford to London Marylebone would take 66 minutes.

== Future ==
In addition to allowing new services between Oxford and London via the Chiltern route, the Evergreen 3 project formed the first phase of the "East West Rail" project that is to see a new 100 mph (160 km/h) service linking Oxford with Milton Keynes, Bedford and Cambridge. The western section of this route, between Oxford and Bedford, was approved by the Government in November 2011.
