= Bicester Village railway station =

Railway station in Oxfordshire, England

Bicester Village
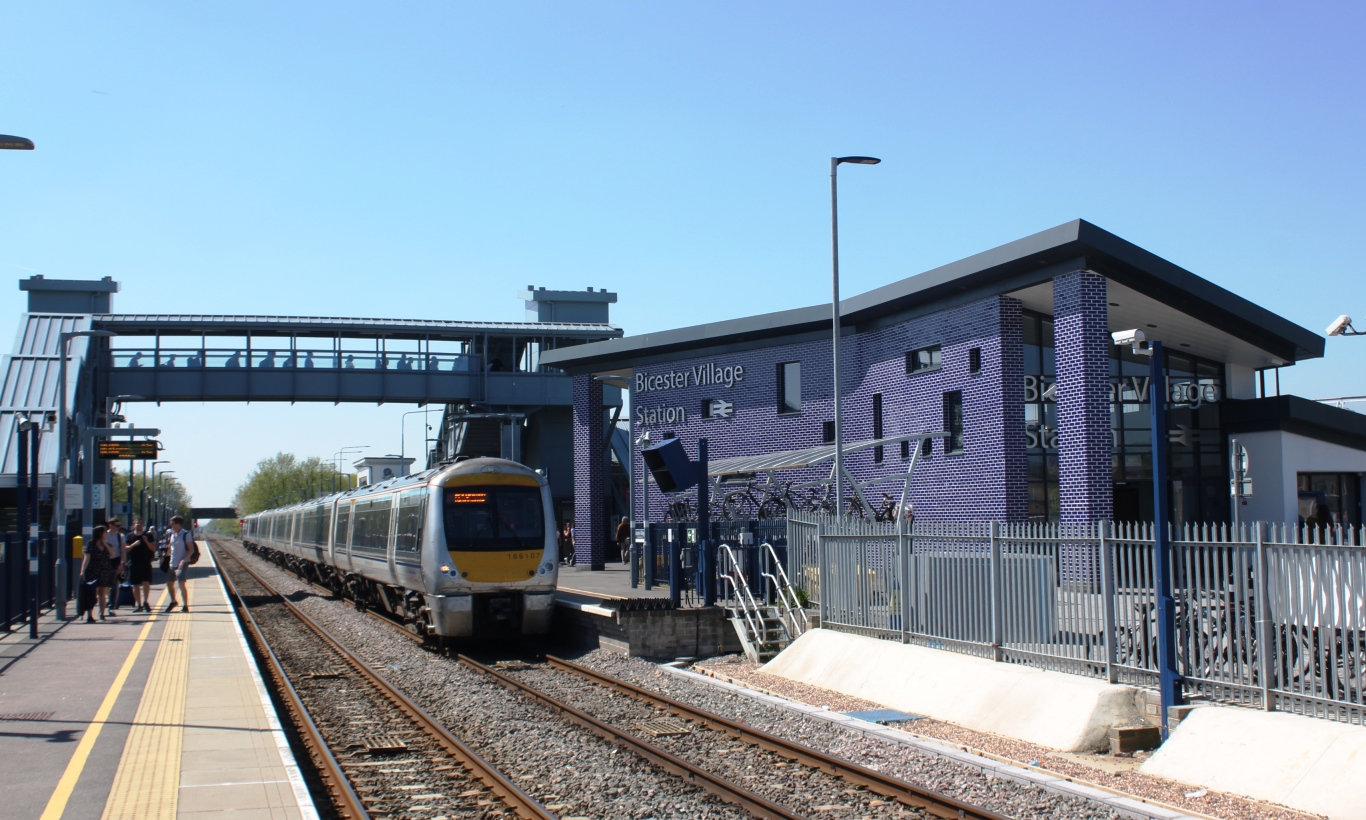
- Two Class 168s at the station

General information
- Location: Bicester, Cherwell District, England
- Coordinates: 51.8931°N 1.1485°W
- Grid reference: SP586219
- Managed by: Chiltern Railways
- Platforms: 2

Other information
- Station code: BIT
- Classification: DfT category F1

History
- Original company: Buckinghamshire Railway
- Pre-grouping: London and North Western Railway
- Post-grouping: London, Midland and Scottish Railway

Key dates
- 1 October 1850: Opened as Bicester
- March 1954: Renamed Bicester London Road
- 1 January 1968: Closed
- 11 May 1987: Reopened and renamed Bicester Town
- 15 February 2014: Closed to rail traffic for line upgrade
- 12 March 2015: Renamed Bicester Village
- 25 October 2015: Reopened

Passengers
- 2020/21: ▼0.375 million
- Interchange: ▼130
- 2021/22: ▲1.178 million
- Interchange: ▲509
- 2022/23: ▲1.611 million
- Interchange: ▲616
- 2023/24: ▲1.760 million
- Interchange: ▲832
- 2024/25: ▲1.926 million
- Interchange: ▼219
Location
Notes
- Passenger statistics from the Office of Rail and Road

Bicester Village is one of two railway stations serving Bicester, in Oxfordshire, England; the other is Bicester North. It lies 12 miles (19 km) north-east of Oxford on the Oxford–Bicester line, near to its junction with the Chiltern Main Line. The station reopened on 25 October 2015 with this new name (as it serves Bicester Village shopping centre in particular), with trains initially running between Oxford Parkway and London Marylebone. The station and all trains serving it are operated by Chiltern Railways.

Following the reinstatement of the railway line between Bicester and Bletchley, as part of East West Rail, Chiltern Railways had expected to begin services between Oxford and Milton Keynes Central via Bicester and Bletchley from late 2025. As of June 2026, the date when services will begin remains unresolved.

== History ==
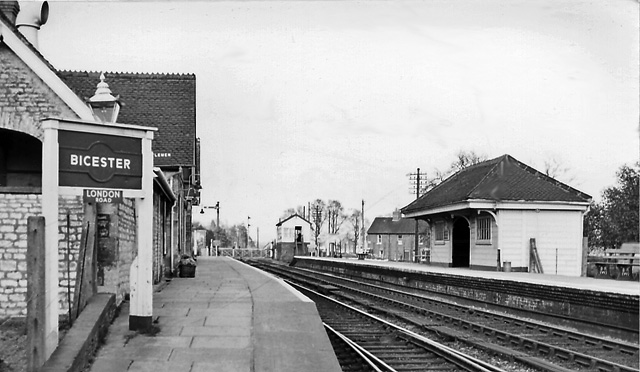
Bicester London Road station with two platforms, 1961

The Buckinghamshire Railway, which already had a route between Bletchley and Banbury Merton Street, had powers to build a line to Oxford Rewley Road. The first part of this line, which ran from a junction to the west of Winslow (at a point which became known as Verney Junction) to Islip, opened on 1 October 1850, and this included a station at Bicester. (Note: At its maximum extent, the line extended from Oxford to Cambridge and thus became known as the Varsity line.) Originally named Bicester, the station was renamed Bicester London Road in March 1954, although the nameboards were not altered until 20 September 1954.

=== 1968 closure ===
The station was closed, along with the rest of the Oxford–Bletchley section of the Varsity Line, on 1 January 1968. However, the station was used by several excursion trains through the 1970s and 1980s.

=== 1987 reopening ===
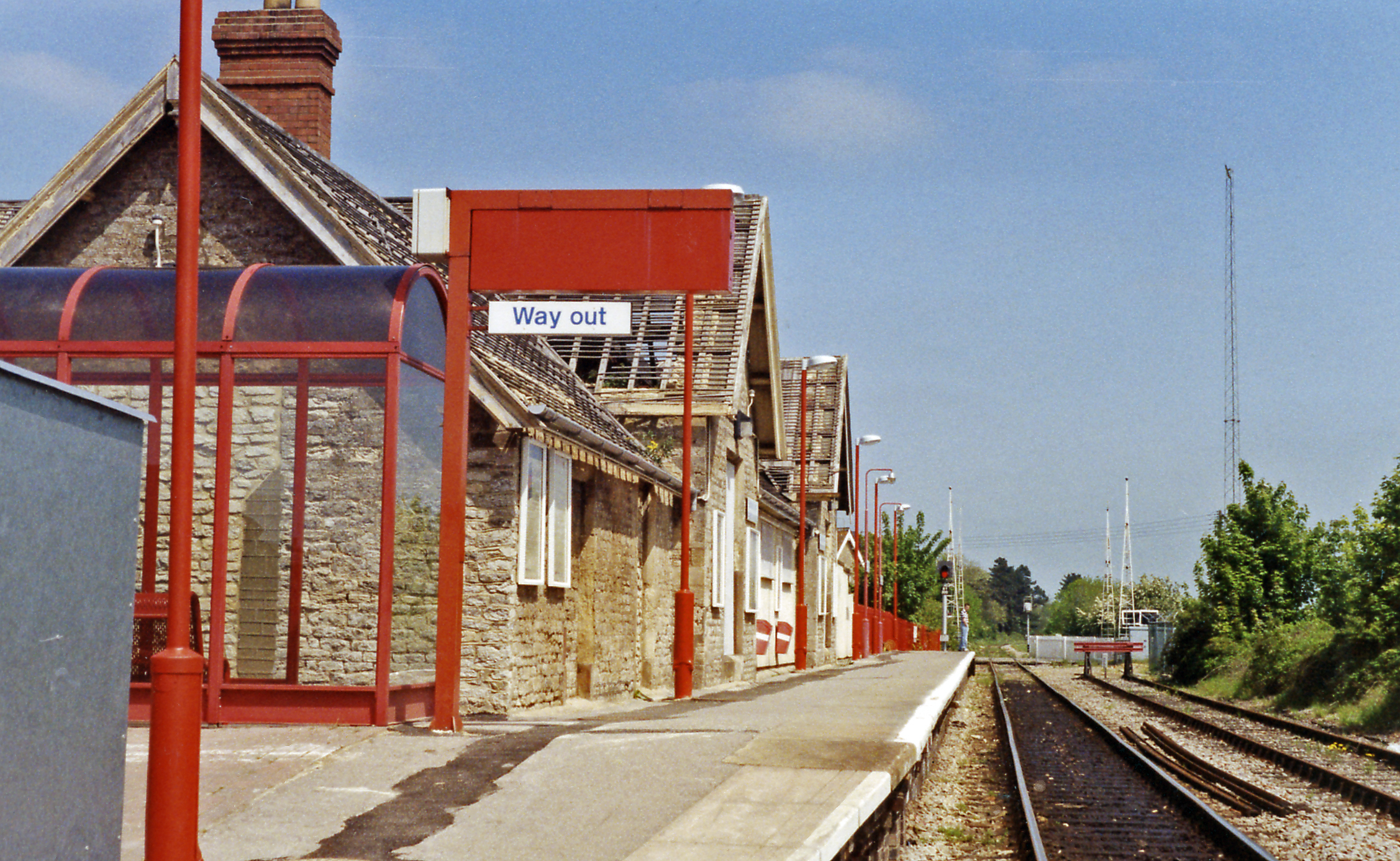
Bicester Town station, 1992

Network SouthEast reopened the station as Bicester Town on 11 May 1987, as the northern terminus of the Oxford to Bicester Line. From May 2009, First Great Western (FGW) and Oxfordshire County Council branded the line The Bicester Link. Since then, operation of the line has been transferred from FGW to Chiltern Railways.

Since 1987, the frequency of trains has varied and passenger numbers have fluctuated accordingly. In the four years 2007–2011, more frequent trains led to an increase in the total number of passengers using Bicester Town by 258%. (Note: Office of the Rail Regulator passenger data: 04/05, ▼50,197; 05/06, ▼48,685; 06/07, ▼43,950; 07/08, ▲51,902; 08/09, ▲59,964; 09/10, ▲105,000; 10/11, ▲157,000.)

In August 2008, Chiltern Railways announced a proposal to build a new 1/4 mile (400 m) chord to link the Oxford-to-Bicester Line with the Chiltern Main Line to carry a new service between Oxford and London, via High Wycombe. The single line between Bicester Town and Oxford was to be doubled and a new station built at Oxford Parkway. Approval was granted in October 2012.

From December 2008, the service on Mondays to Saturdays was improved, with an evening service and a doubling of the service on Saturdays. The service was increased to 11 trains Monday-to-Thursday, 12 on Fridays and 13 on Saturdays. From May 2009, further improvements saw extra trains in the daytime on Mondays to Fridays and a new Sunday service, with trains every 90 minutes.

On 22 May 2011, Chiltern Railways took over all passenger operations from First Great Western ahead of the new service between London Marylebone and Oxford that was due to start in 2013. It was later amended to 2015.

=== Closure and reopening ===
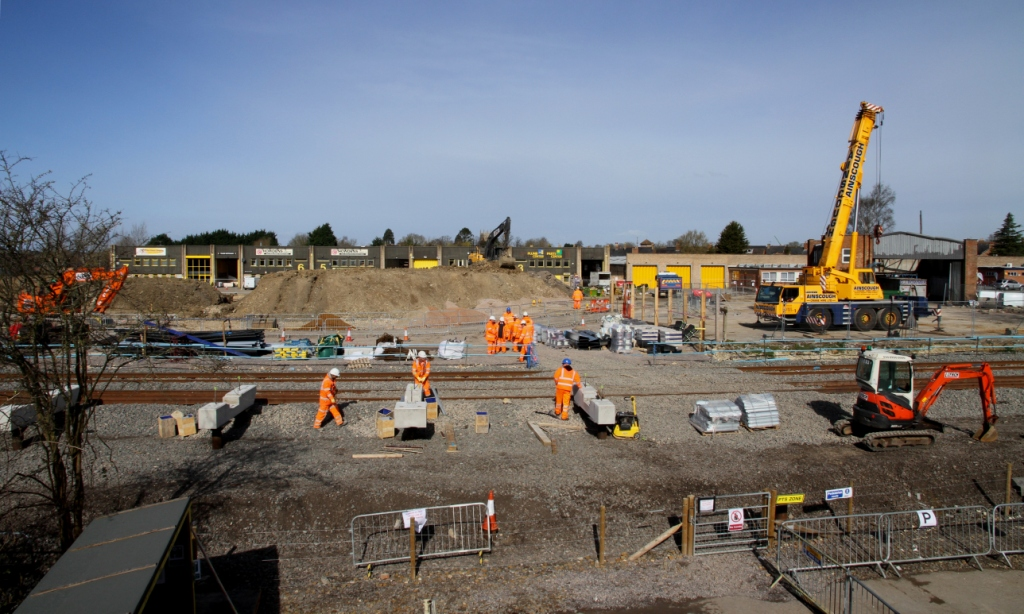
Work progressing on concrete supports for the station platforms, March 2015

The last trains ran late on 14 February 2014 before the station was closed to allow upgrade of the line between Oxford and Bicester. The reopening, first planned for May 2015, was delayed until 25 October 2015 with the official ceremony the following day.

On 12 March 2015, Chiltern Railways announced that it would rename the station Bicester Village after the nearby designer retail outlet. This change has been seen as controversial by many who live in Bicester who thought that it had taken place without proper consultation. The outlet's presence has also led to the use of Arabic and Chinese language signage and station calls in Mandarin to aid foreign travellers.

Before it closed for the rebuild, the station had one platform, a covered waiting area, seats, a clock, help point and public address. There were a number of bicycle stands but no ticket facilities; passengers could buy these on the train instead. As part of the works, the station was completely rebuilt as a two-platform station and ticket machines were provided.

== Facilities ==
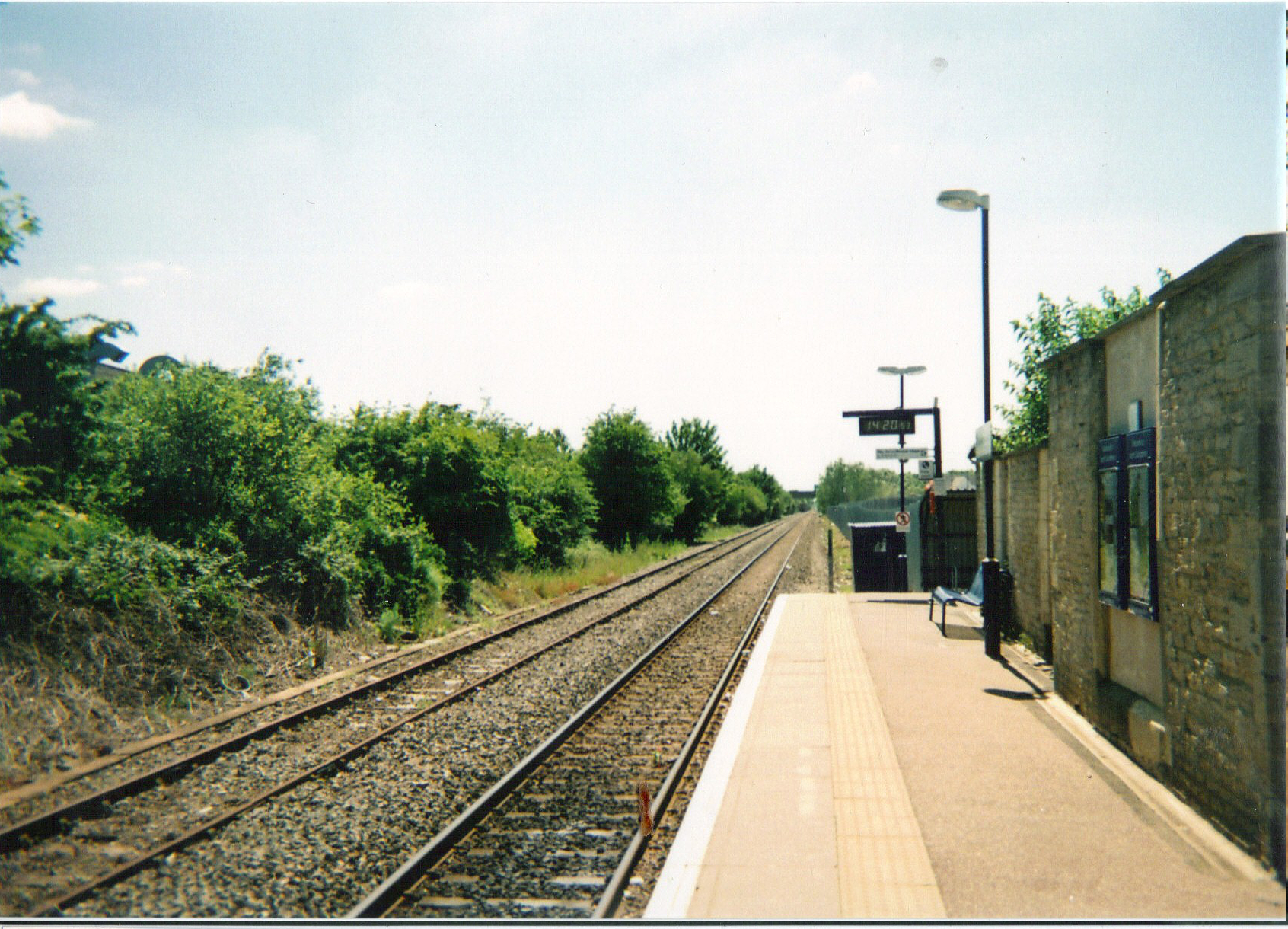
The station, 2010

The station has two car parks; between them, they provide 230 standard spaces, plus 18 for passengers with reduced mobility. There is also parking for 60 bicycles and 18 motorcycles.

A shuttle bus route BV1 connects the station to the shopping village.

== Services ==
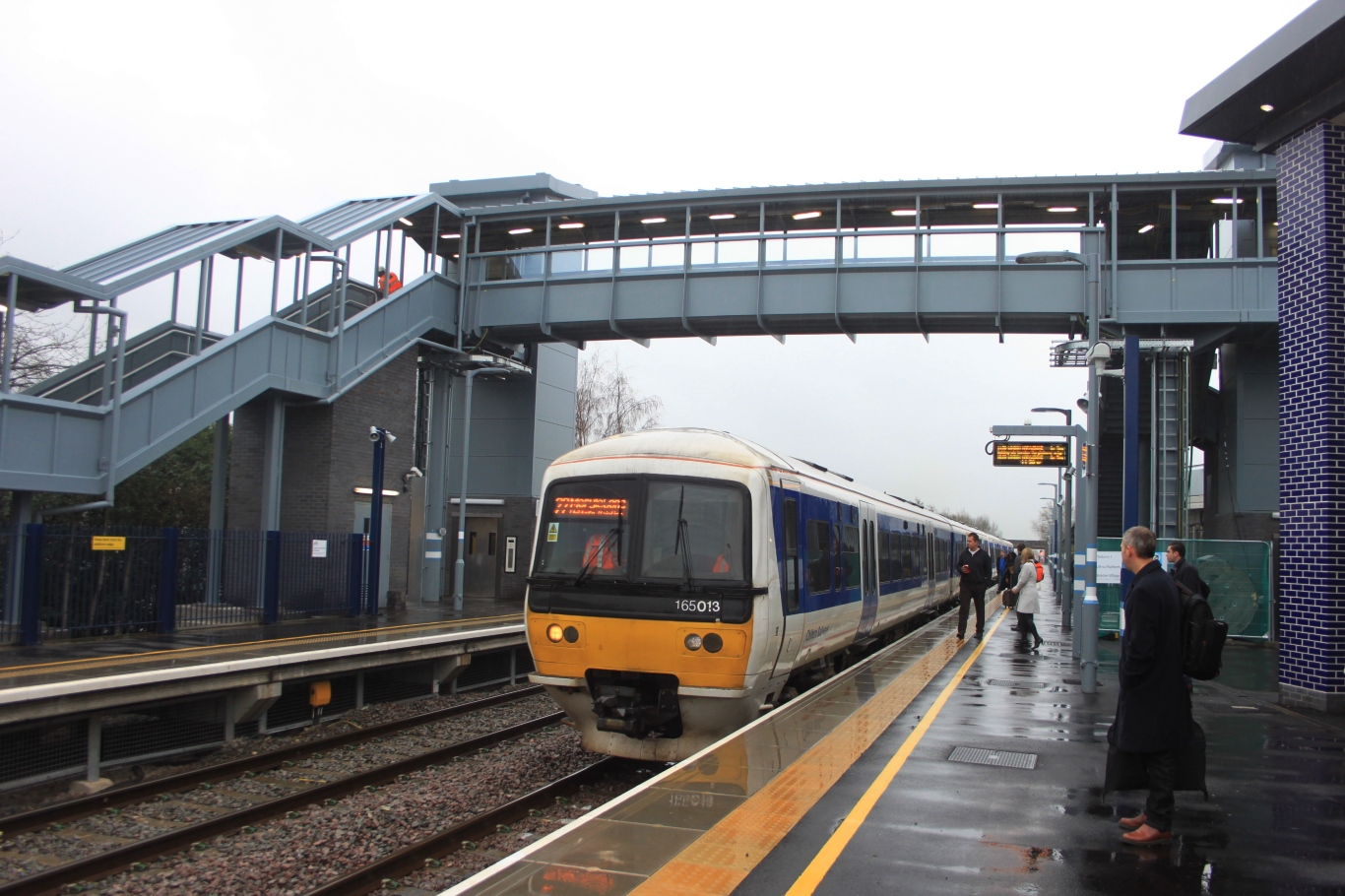
A Chiltern Railways service to London Marylebone

The station is served by two trains per hour in each direction between London Marylebone and Oxford.

Preceding station	National Rail	Following station
Islip or Oxford Parkway	Chiltern Railways; Oxford–Bicester line London Marylebone – Oxford	Haddenham and Thame Parkway or Princes Risborough
	Future services	
Oxford Parkway	Chiltern Railways; East West Rail; Oxford – Milton Keynes/Bedford	Winslow
	Historical railways	
Wendlebury Halt; Line open, station closed	London and North Western Railway; Varsity Line	Launton; Line and station closed

=== Future services ===
As of July 2022, the line eastward towards Bletchley is out of service while work is in progress on the section between Bicester and Bletchley. The route is scheduled to reopen by late 2024. Services are planned to link Bicester with Winslow, Milton Keynes Central and Bedford.

Once East West Rail is running, an hourly Oxford-Bedford service and a half-hourly Oxford-Milton Keynes Central service are planned, bringing the total number of trains between Bicester Village and Oxford up to five per hour.
