= Gerrards Cross Tunnel collapse =

Railway tunnel in Gerrards Cross, Buckinghamshire

Gerrards Cross Tunnel
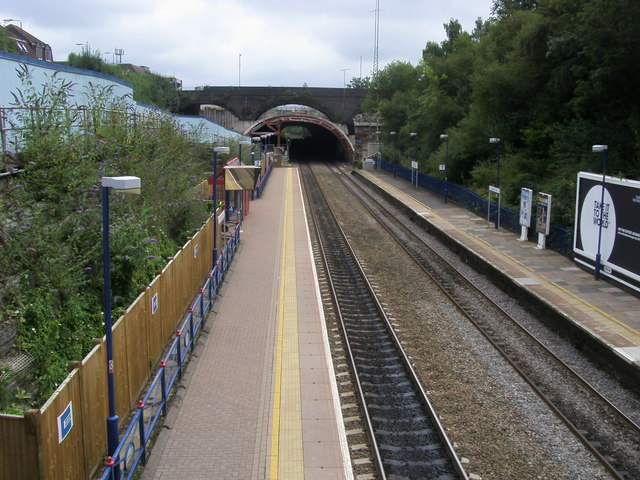
- Gerrards Cross station and tunnel in 2009
- Interactive map of Gerrards Cross Tunnel

Overview
- Line: Chiltern Main Line
- Location: Gerrards Cross, Buckinghamshire, England
- Coordinates: 51.588343°N 0.553007°W

Operation
- Work began: 2003
- Opened: 2010

Technical
- Length: 310 metres (340 yd)
- No. of tracks: 2
- Track gauge: 4 ft 8 1/2 in (1,435 mm)

Gerrards Cross Tunnel is a 310-metre-long (340 yd) railway tunnel in Gerrards Cross, Buckinghamshire, on the Chiltern Main Line, next to the railway station. The purpose of the tunnel was to enable a new Tesco supermarket to be built over the railway line. Plans were initially met with anger by local residents, and the council refused planning permission, but this decision was overturned by Secretary of State for the Environment, Transport and the Regions John Prescott.

During construction of the tunnel, it partially collapsed on 30 June 2005. No-one was injured in the accident, although a train heading towards the tunnel when it collapsed had to perform an emergency stop. Early reports suspected the cause was the backfilling operation. An initial freedom of information request on 10 December 2020 was denied; however, a later request in 2022 was successful, and confirmed the cause of collapse to be the backfilling operation.

Despite the incident, the construction continued in 2007 with different contractors building the tunnel. The store opened in November 2010, fourteen years after the project was commissioned.

== Background ==
Tesco, the third largest retailer in the world measured by revenues and the second largest measured by profits first proposed a store on the site in 1996. The local council also objected to the development and a public inquiry endorsed this decision. In July 1998, however, Deputy Prime Minister John Prescott overturned the council's ruling on the basis of the recommendations of an independent planning inspector. Due to a lack of space in the area, Tesco had proposed building over the railway line, which would free up a large area of land suitable for the development.

The work was let under a design and build contract to Jackson Civil Engineering, who announced the store would be designed by White Young Green, and specialist supplier Reinforced Earth Company. Work started on site in early 2003. At the time Jackson Civil Engineering were part of the Peterhouse Group, which was subsequently bought by Babcock International Group in 2004, after the Jackson Civil Engineering division had been sold in a management buyout. Babcock were still subject to the parent company guarantee that Peterhouse Group had entered into when the contract to build the tunnel was let.

The design used precast concrete sections, each of which made up half of a three-pinned arch. These segments were connected to each other at the middle of the arch, and material then built back up over the arch, known as backfilling. The method of construction was not unique. "There are eight tunnels like this in Britain," said James Ford of Chiltern Railways, "and something like a thousand worldwide." At the time of collapse, construction work on the tunnel segments had finished, and the backfilling operation was taking place. The foundations had been built and the steel frame of the supermarket erected.

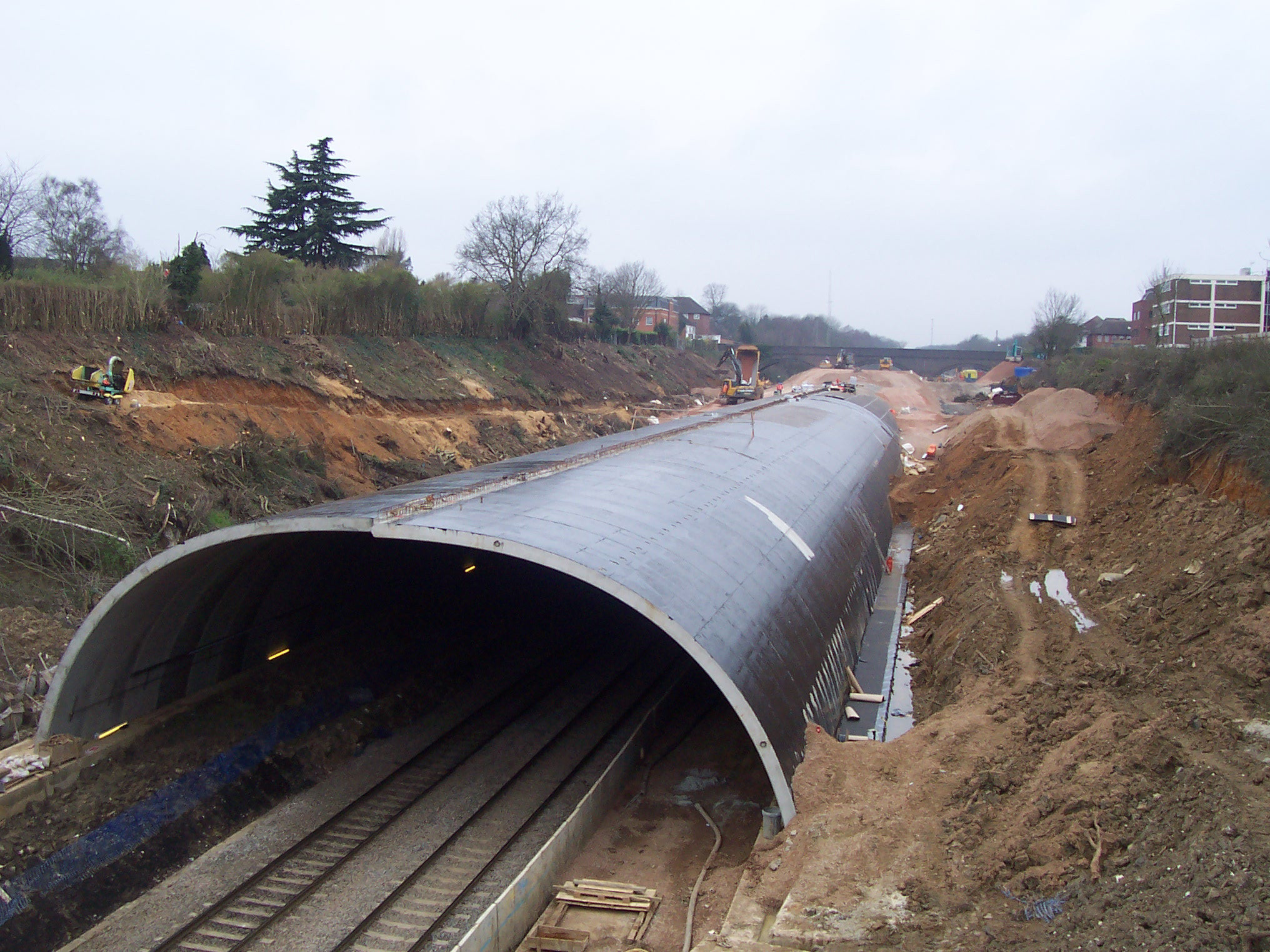
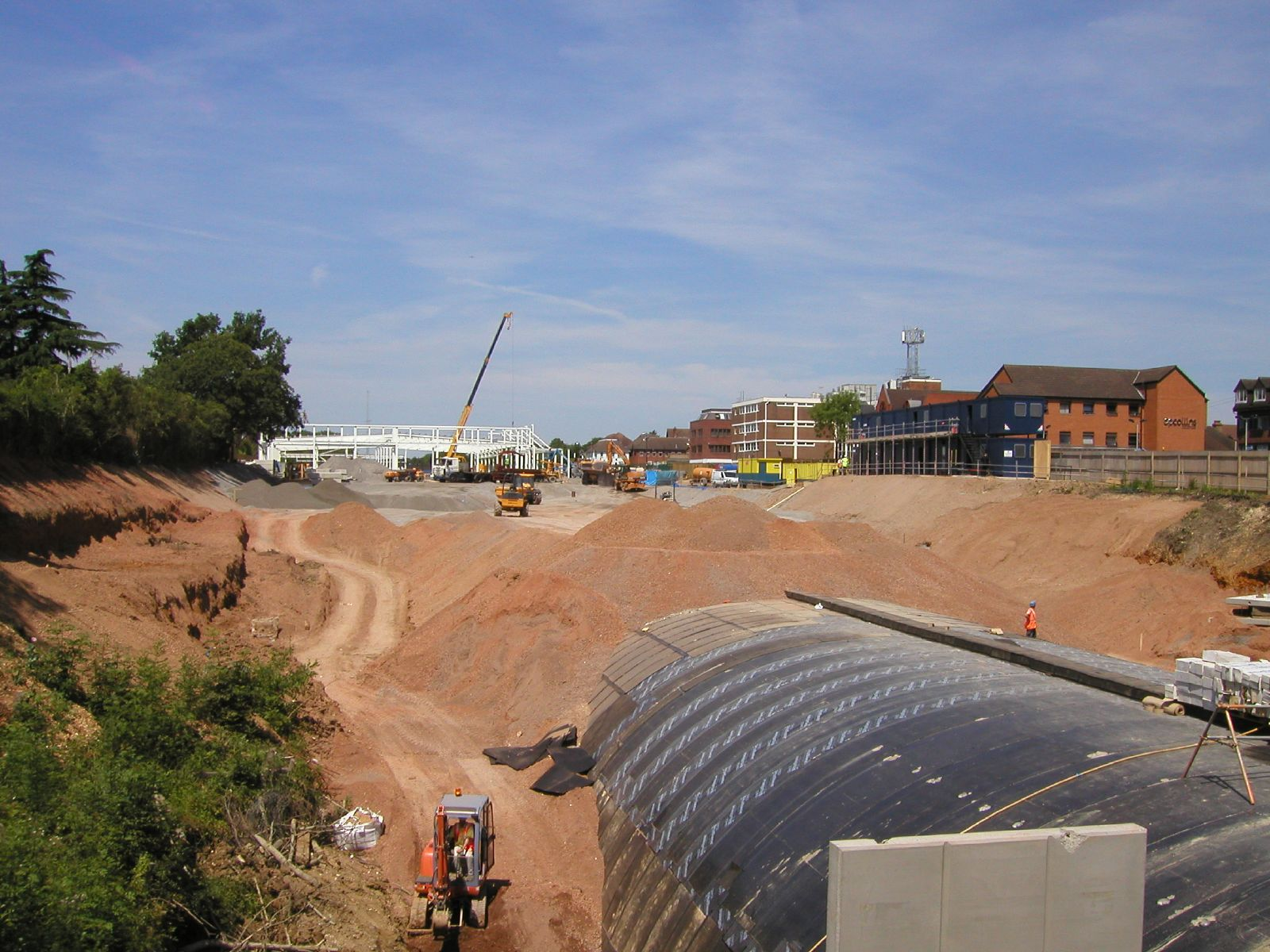
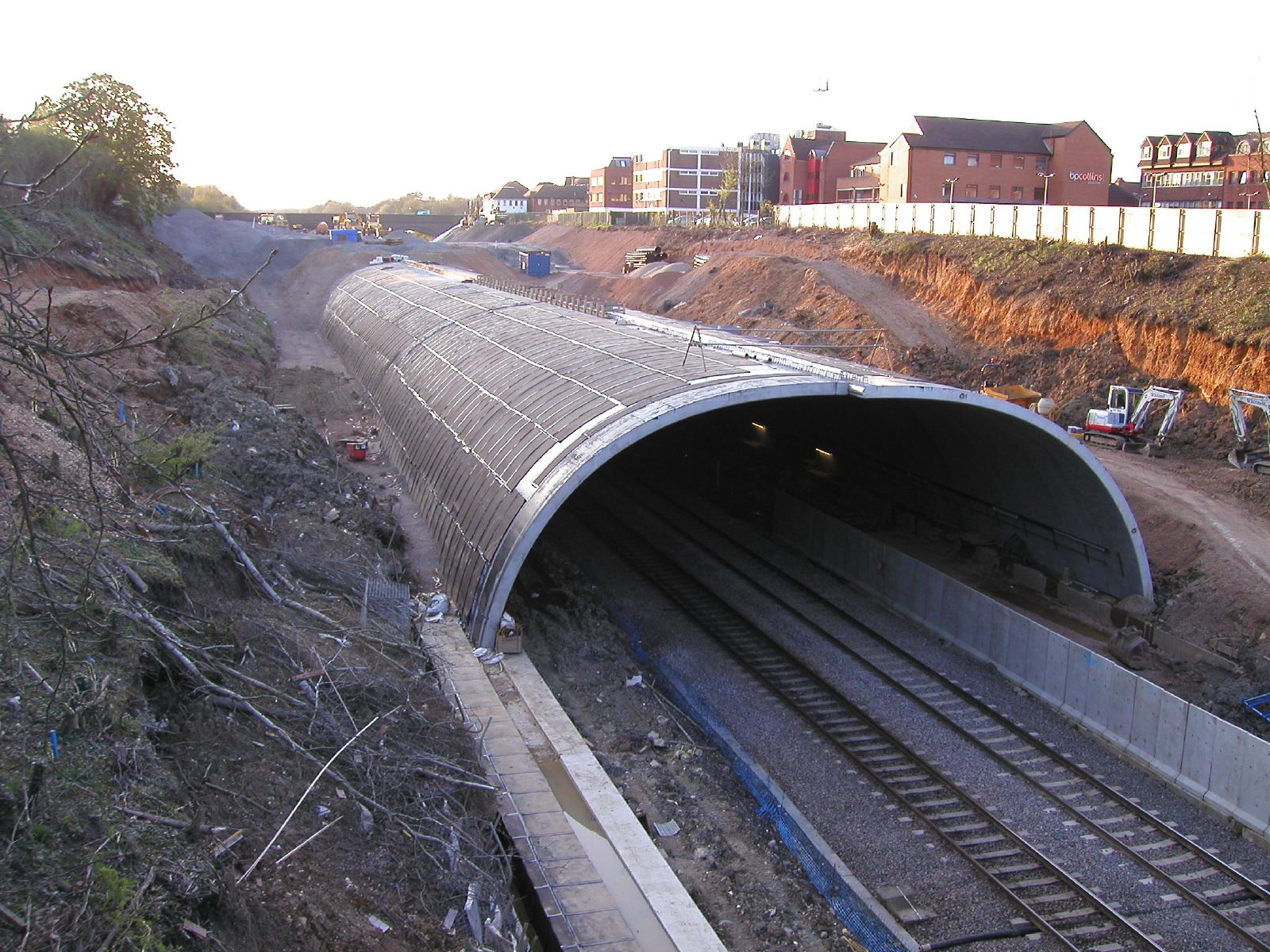
Construction of the tunnel, which was meant to enable the construction of a new supermarket over the railway line, pictured three months before the collapse. While the council blocked the store, the decision was overturned and construction began.

== Collapse ==
During the collapse, the crown of the tunnel caved in on itself, bringing the tonnes of soil piled on top down onto the railway tracks, which are visible in the foreground.

At 7.34pm on 30 June 2005, 30 metres (33 yards) of the 320 metre (350 yard) tunnel collapsed. At the time, there were no trains passing through the tunnel, although one train, heading west towards High Wycombe, had to make an emergency stop. The train had passed through Denham Golf Club station, the last stop before Gerrards Cross, before the driver was warned by radio. He reversed the train to Denham Golf Club, where all passengers were let off. Additionally, a London-bound train was standing at the eastbound platform at Gerrards Cross waiting to depart. The driver of this train had just set the train in motion when he saw the collapse, stopped his train using the emergency brake, and informed the railway signallers by radio; they in turn stopped other trains. There were no casualties as a result of the incident. One witness told a news channel that he was parking his car when he heard "what sounded like a clap of thunder - I thought it was an earthquake. I saw the tunnel falling on to the rail track." Reg Whittome, chairman of the Marylebone Travellers' Association and the Chiltern Railway Passenger Board, said after the incident that, had a train been going through the tunnel when it collapsed, there would have been an "almighty tragedy". He added: "Had it been during the rush hour, hundreds could have been killed."

== Service disruption ==
Service was disrupted for two months after the collapse, until 22 August 2005, so material could be removed from site. The line was closed and rail replacement bus services were operated. The 29 precast concrete segments that had collapsed were removed, together with another 16 segments that were damaged. Extensive design checks were carried out to ensure that the sections of tunnel lining that had not collapsed were safe. 15,000 tonnes of material were removed from the area which had suffered the collapse, and 12,000 tonnes of backfill was removed from the undamaged sections. Despite the railway line reopening, approval was not given to carry on with the work as originally proposed. Network Rail and Chiltern Railways advised that further checks were required to confirm the safety of the design.

"The tunnel has collapsed. We've now got to assess today why that happened," said Robin Gisby, head of operations for Network Rail. "Experts are in there right now and they will work through the tunnel and decide what was the cause of the delay. Then we're going to make it safe, then we're going to work out how we're going to clear up the considerable problem we've got. There's a couple of thousand tonnes of material in there that we've got to move. We've got to get the concrete structure, that has collapsed, out. We've probably got to do all of that by road. Although we brought the material in by rail, we don't think we can get it out by rail, but we won't assess that until later on today and through the night. I think that's going to be at least a week's work, possibly longer, before we can restore rail services on this route. Passengers are being advised to travel via alternative routes and buses have also been ordered. We are currently putting arrangements in place to minimise disruption."

At the time of the accident, James Ford added that no further work would be carried out on the tunnel unless it had been certified as safe. "As to whether or not Tesco plans to continue building above the tunnel, we just don't know," he said. "What we do know is that there will be no further work, or anything that could have an effect on it, unless Network Rail and the HSE are satisfied that it's safe to do so. Network Rail will consult us if this situation arises. Tesco may, however, choose to continue work on parts of the supermarket project that are not directly connected to the tunnel."

== Investigation ==
The initial investigations into the cause of collapse focused on the backfilling operation. The tunnel segments allowed for substantial vertical settlement during construction, and it was vital that the material was built up evenly on both sides and over the crown of the arch. Shortly after the incident, however, Gisby said that "something" about the backfilling "is not right." The chief executive of Jackson Civil Engineering, however, said that the process used was "in line with what the design allowed. There was a strict loading regime in place." Geotechnical engineers commenting in the wake of the incident expressed surprise at the difference in fill levels on either side of the arch, and doubts were expressed that the backfilling had been in accordance with the method statement. "The collapse was probably due to too much load on the crown of the arch and not enough fill on the sides," the head of a specialist consulting firm said.

"Units [appear to] have failed by creating a hinge in the concrete section. The hinge has rotated downwards, which is consistent with the crown of the arch moving downwards under excessive load and/or the sides of the arch moving outwards under too little lateral restraint. This problem would have been made worse if there was a significant difference in the level of the fill on the two sides. At the section that is still standing the central hinge has bent down indicating an imbalance between the vertical and horizontal loads and a failure by outward spreading of the arch." He added that heavy rainfall, which had hit Gerrards Cross several days before the collapse, may have made the problem worse. "It is possible that rainfall increased the vertical load on the tunnel. At the same time, if the fill at the sides is not completely free draining, it could have led to a reduction in the passive pressure available from the fill on the sides." Another construction specialist said: "You could trigger failure if you go straight from full depth fill over one section straight to no fill; that is, a section that's fully flexed next to one that's unflexed."

The Health and Safety Executive launched an investigation into the collapse in 2005. Owing to the complex nature of the probe, it remained open until 2015. A final report has been prepared, but has not yet been made public pending resolution of legal issues.

== Aftermath ==
The incident brought protests from local residents and the council. The local Conservative MP, Dominic Grieve, said: "If this particular disaster encourages Tesco to not go ahead with the scheme, everyone in Gerrards Cross will be absolutely delighted." Peter Hardy, the leader of South Bucks district council, added after the landslide that there would be "further years of disruption ... It would be better to abandon the project. I'm not against Tesco as such, but as a council, we want the inquiry into the collapse of the tunnel to be open and transparent. We want to know why such a hugely complex engineering process has been deemed necessary to build a relatively small new Tesco store. And we want something positive back from Tesco."

There were protests by local residents against the store. One protester said they were "fighting to get Tesco to tell us exactly why the tunnel collapsed, and to stop them from succeeding in winning further planning permission to continue work on the store." Some were less opposed to the store. "People here like to have a go at Tesco," an estate agent said. "I suppose most of us would have preferred a Marks & Spencer food hall, but we'll all shop in Tesco anyway."

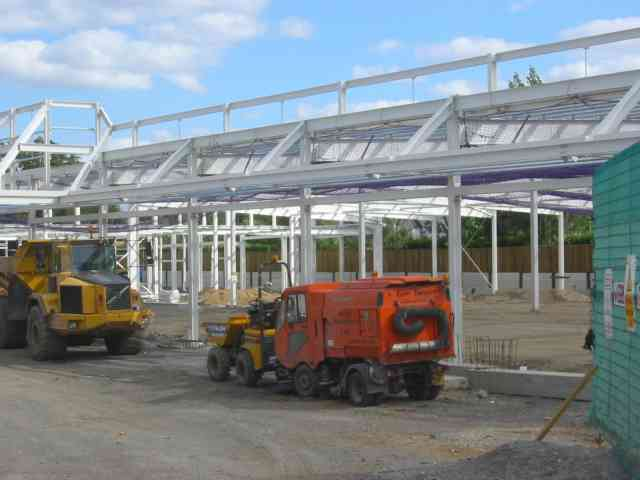
The store being erected shortly after construction restarted. Tesco appointed a new team to continue the design and construction of the tunnel and store.

In 2006, Tesco appointed a new team to carry out the design and construction of the tunnel and store. Costain were assigned as main contractor and Scott Wilson as lead designer. In light of the collapse, a far more cautious approach was taken to the design. Precast concrete arch sections were used, but these simply act as formwork for a 600mm (2 foot) thick in-situ concrete continuous arch, a much more robust structure. To further reduce the loading on the tunnel, piled walls have been installed either side of the tunnel, and a lighter fill material—including foamed concrete—used over the top of the arch.

The store opened in late November 2010, 5 years later than originally planned, and 14 years after the project started. The store manager, Lizzie Field, said: "We are really pleased to support our local community at a time when so many people are looking for jobs, and there is so much competition between applicants. The quality of applicants was fantastic and my new team and I are already enjoying working together." When the store opened, the Bucks Free Press reported that there was still opposition to the "controversial" store. The newspaper reported that "some have complained about dust coming from the site, as well as traffic delays while roadworks were carried out." A local resident, who protested against the project since it was announced, said: "It's been very very frustrating. I won't be using the store and a lot of people in Gerrards Cross feel the same way. I think the traffic situation is going to be horrendous."

== See also ==
- Structural failure
- List of structural failures and collapses
