= Oxford Parkway railway station =

Railway station in Oxfordshire, England

Oxford Parkway
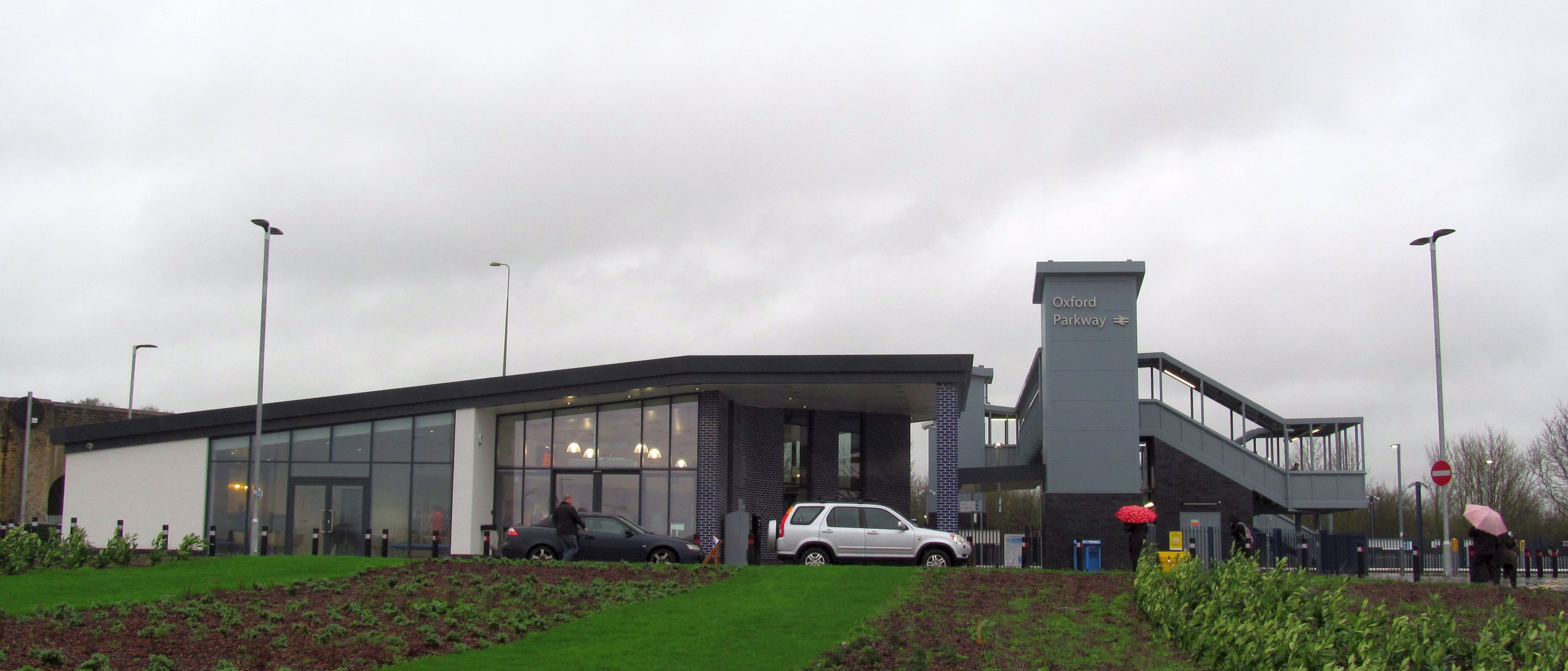

General information
- Location: Water Eaton, Cherwell; England
- Coordinates: 51.8042°N 1.2745°W
- Grid reference: SP501119
- Owner: Network Rail
- Manager: Chiltern Railways
- Platforms: 2

Other information
- Station code: OXP

History
- Original company: Network Rail

Key dates
- 25 October 2015: Opened

Passengers
- 2021/22: ▲0.457 million
- 2022/23: ▲0.585 million
- 2023/24: ▲0.654 million
- 2024/25: ▲0.655 million
- 2025/26: ▲0.656 million
Location
Notes
- Passenger statistics from the Office of Rail and Road

Oxford Parkway railway station is a railway station at Water Eaton, Oxfordshire, on the Oxford–Bicester line. Full regular weekday service began on 25 October 2015, although the first passengers travelled the previous day on a Sunday timetable.

The station, whose name was changed in September 2013 from the provisional "Water Eaton Parkway", lies between Kidlington and Oxford beside the existing Water Eaton park-and-ride site. It serves Kidlington, north Oxford and nearby villages. The station forms part of a multi-modal transport interchange node, connecting travellers by bus, cycle, on foot, and by car with rail transport. It is also intended to attract park-and-ride traffic from the busy A34, A40 and A44 roads.

Services to Oxford started on 11 December 2016.

== Description ==
The station is part of Project Evergreen 3, funded and managed by Chiltern Railways. It is served every half-hour by trains from London Marylebone. Chiltern Railways opened the station in October 2015 for trains towards Bicester and London Marylebone, with services to Oxford railway station beginning in December 2016, delayed from Spring 2016 as locals objected to the extra noise that would be caused. The journey time to London is about an hour. Network Rail completed the final track upgrades on this portion of the route in September 2016 allowing driver training runs on the line ahead of the inauguration of new services on 11 December.

The East West Rail Consortium's planned rail service between Oxford and Milton Keynes Central and Bedford Midland will also serve Oxford Parkway.

The station is on the site of the Buckinghamshire Railway's temporary Oxford Banbury Road terminus (1850–51), and north-east of the site of the former Oxford Road Halt (1905–26). In 1942, a Government grain silo was built next to the site as part of a Second World War network to concentrate scarce food and distribute it by rail. It was in use until the late 1980s. In October 2013 Chiltern Railways had it demolished as part of site preparation for the new station and car park.

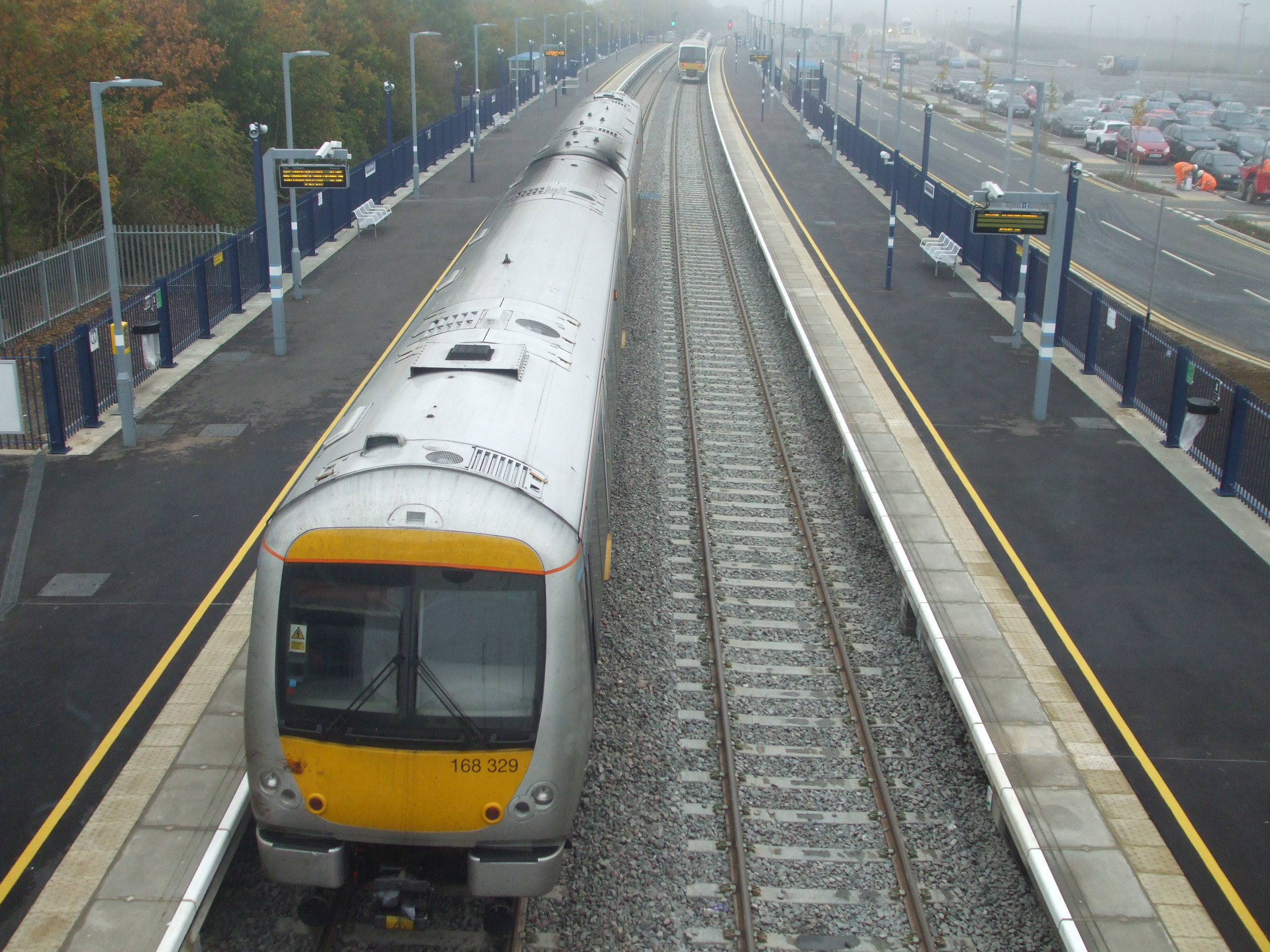
The station in November 2015, soon after opening

The Oxford Parkway (Formerly known as Water Eaton) Park-and-Ride is immediately adjacent, with bus services to central Oxford, London Oxford Airport and to the Headington hospitals (Monday to Friday only).

The station lies on National Cycle Route 51, which links Oxford to Bicester and further East. Oxford Parkway has covered two-level parking for 152 pedal cycles adjacent to the entrance, additional to the existing cycle parking at the nearby Park & Ride. It has CCTV surveillance.

The car park has 815 standard spaces, plus 41 spaces for passengers with reduced mobility. There is real-time information about remaining available spaces. There is a fee to park a car but the first hour is free. There are also spaces for 30 motorcycles.

Purchase of rail travel tickets is by machine; there is no ticket office at the station, but there is an information desk. Toilet and refreshment facilities are also present.

== Grain silo ==
Before the station's construction, the site was occupied by a large grain silo. This followed a standard pattern common to other wartime silos, taking the form of two banks of ten seven-storey high cylindrical reinforced concrete silos side by side, with the space between them filled by a brick access shaft. In the shaft, there were associated grain handling machinery and two enormous grain driers which extended the full height of the building. It was built in the early 1940s and closed in the late 1980s, after which the yard surrounding it was used by several local businesses including a pet food supplier and a car breaker.

== Construction ==
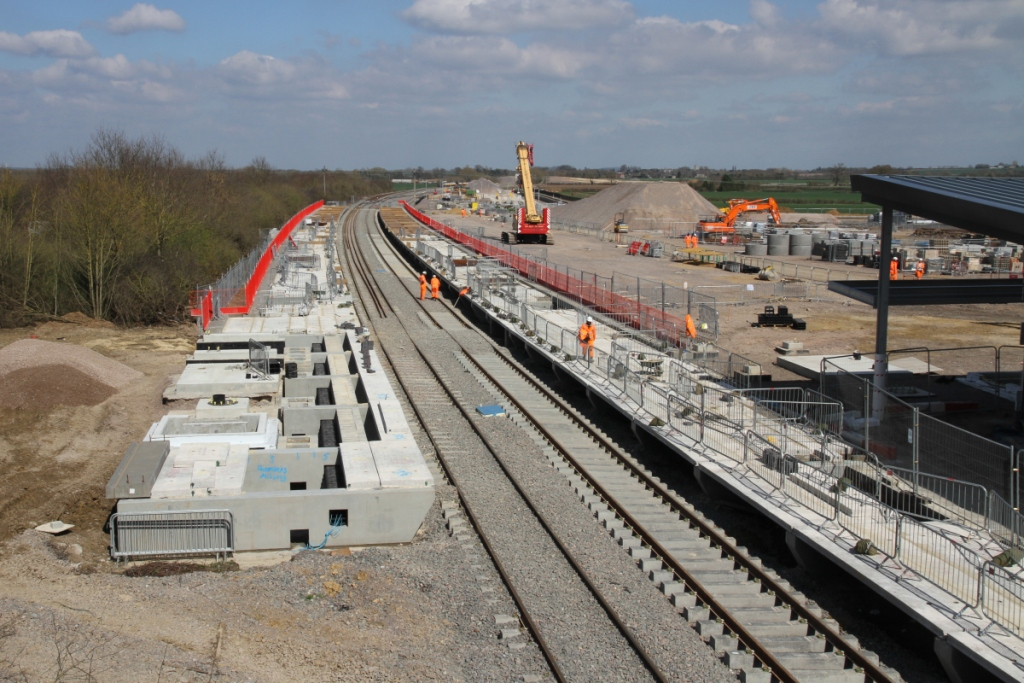
Platforms under construction in April 2015, looking towards Islip

Building of the station began in late October 2014 and was sufficiently advanced for services to begin one year later.

== Services ==
All services at Oxford Parkway are operated by Chiltern Railways. The current off-peak service in trains per hour is:

- 2 tph to London Marylebone
- 2 tph to Oxford

Preceding station	National Rail	Following station
Oxford	Chiltern Railways; London Marylebone – Oxford	Islip or Bicester Village
	Future services	
Oxford	Chiltern Railways; East West Rail; Oxford - Milton Keynes	Bicester Village
