= Public performance measure =

Measure of the punctuality and reliability of passenger trains in Britain

The public performance measure (PPM) is a measure of the punctuality and reliability of passenger trains in Britain. It is the percentage of scheduled trains which successfully run their entire planned route, calling at all timetabled stations, and arrive at their terminating station 'on time', where 'on time' means within five minutes of the scheduled destination arrival time for London and South East and regional operators (i.e. commuter services), or within ten minutes for long-distance operators.

It is the industry standard measurement of performance, and has been used since 6 June 2000.

The target for PPM varies each year and for each train operator, and is agreed with the Office of Rail Regulation. In October 2013 ORR said that, "Network Rail should... ensure that 92.5% of trains arrive on time nationally by 2019 (as measured using PPM), compared to 90.7% today."

== Causes ==
Network Rail delays due to infrastructure faults cause about 39% of delays, train operating companies 28%, weather, trespass, vandalism, cable theft and fatalities 20%, other train operating companies (mostly other passenger trains) 13%.

=== History ===
Prior to PPM's introduction in 2000, there were a variety of punctuality measures. For example, in 1957 Gerry Fiennes published an analysis showing that permanent way restrictions accounted for 25% of delays, locomotives (eg poor steaming due to wrong type of coal for the engine) 25%, signals (mostly due to other delays) 15%, signal failures 10%, coach defects 8%, station duties 4% and miscellaneous (eg. open doors, lamps out, special stops) 13%.

From 1 April 2019, Network Rail introduced a new 'more detailed and precise set of measures...The official measure of punctuality used up till now, known as the public performance measure (PPM), considers trains to be punctual if they are five or 10 minutes after schedule, for short and long-distance trains are respectively, at their destination. The new measures will report cancellations and the proportion of trains arriving to the minute at every station on the timetable, known as a ‘station stop’, where technology allows...'

== Criticisms ==
- PPM doesn't measure strict punctuality − whether a train arrived strictly on time − but has an inbuilt margin for lateness. This means that a train can be 'on time' according to PPM, but still late enough for passengers to miss their connections. It also means there can be, or appear to be, a difference between the rail industry's perception of what is success, and that of passengers.
- PPM doesn't reflect passenger experience, as no weight is given to the number of passengers on each train − a late night service with few passengers on is counted the same as a rush hour service. Therefore, according to PPM, a near-empty train which arrives 6 minutes late is worse than a fully loaded commuter train which arrives 4 minutes late. As busier rush hour trains are more likely to be delayed than off peak trains, PPM scores are likely to be higher than what most passengers experience.
- As only the time at the terminating station is recorded, a train could have been late at some of its intermediate stations, affecting passengers alighting at those stops, and this would not be a PPM fail. This is particularly the case for timetables with 'backloading', or 'padding', which is when extra minutes are built into the final leg of the journey as 'catch-up' time. While time at the terminus is important for morning commuter trains into a city, when most passengers alight at the terminus, for inter-city trains, cross-country trains, and evening commuter trains out of a city, it is irrelevant to most passengers, who will alight at different points along the journey.
- PPM doesn't measure the quality of the service provided:
  - It makes no judgement whether customer demand is met by the level of service provision, for example whether departure times match customer journey times, how many people have to stand, or whether people are able to board the first train that departs.
  - If minutes are added to a timetabled journey due to repeated lateness, then the service will deteriorate, but PPM will improve.
  - If a different type or size train is run than originally scheduled, then this doesn't count as a PPM fail. Therefore if a train is run with fewer carriages than normal, meaning that some passengers are unable to board who would normally be able to do so, the train can still be a PPM success.
- PPM is measured against the planned timetable as agreed between the operator and Network Rail at 22:00 the night before. So it is possible for train operators and Network Rail to remove services the day before, for example due to strike action, fail to deliver what the customer is used to expecting, and not fail on PPM.
