= Bicester Village =

Shopping centre in Oxfordshire, England

Bicester Village Shopping Complex
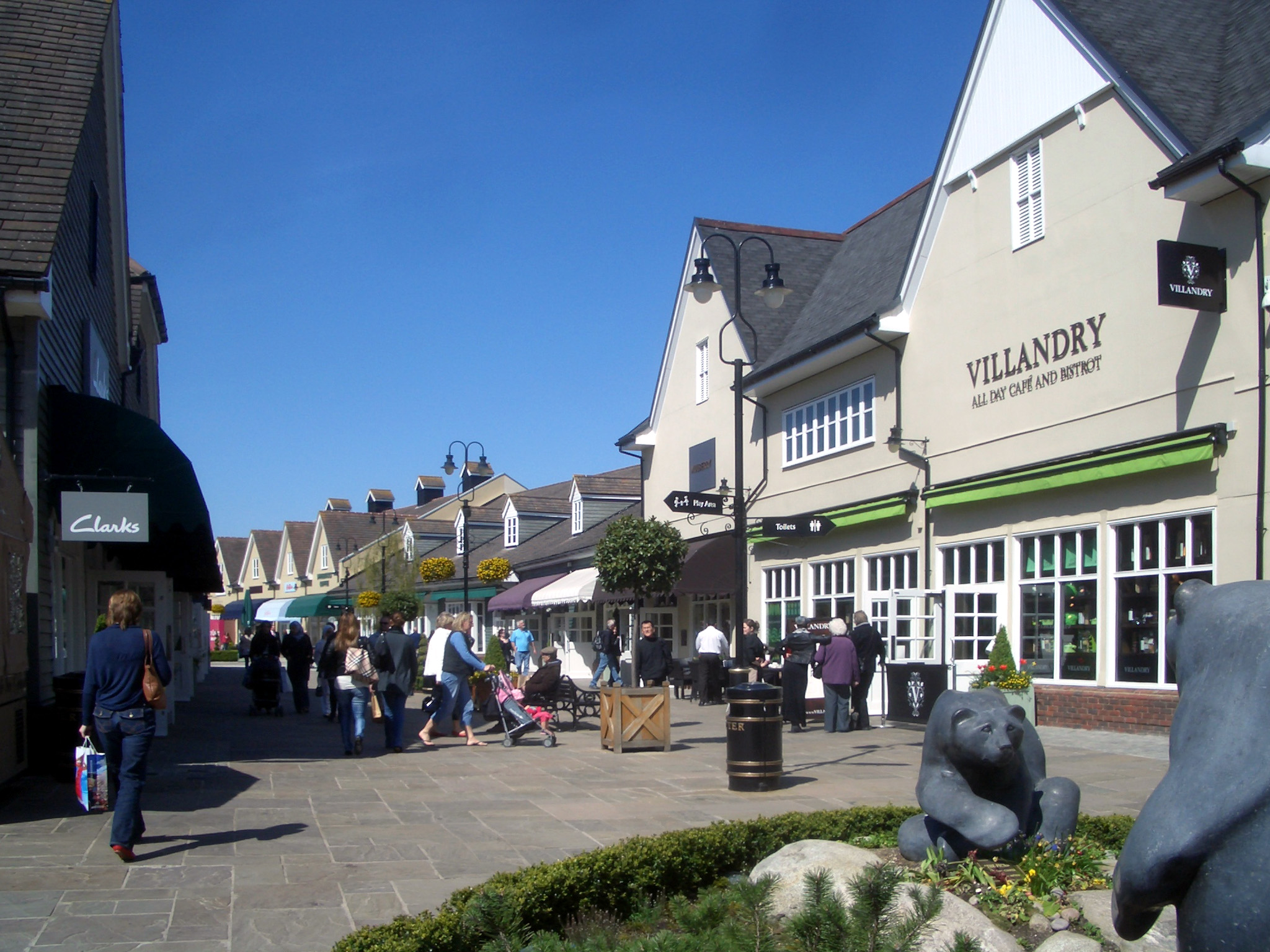
- Bicester Village in 2010
- Interactive map of Bicester Village and environs
- Location: Oxfordshire, United Kingdom
- Coordinates: 51°53′30″N 1°9′21″W
- Address: 50 Pingle Drive, Bicester OX26 6WD, England
- Opened: April 1995
- Owner: The Bicester Collection
- Architect: Lyons+Sleeman+Hoare Architects
- Num. of stores: Approx. 150
- Floor area: 286,564 square feet
- Parking: 2,720
- Public transit: Bicester Village railway station
- Website: www.thebicestercollection.com/bicester-village/en/

Bicester Village is a designer outlet shopping centre in Bicester, a town in Oxfordshire, England. The shopping centre opened in April 1995. It is part of The Bicester Collection, a family of 12 luxury shopping destinations in Europe, China and the United States. Bicester Village has more than 150 boutiques of national and international fashion and lifestyle brands. The centre is the second most visited location in the United Kingdom by Chinese tourists, after Buckingham Palace, with 6.7 million visitors in 2024.

== Background and history ==
The story of Bicester Village began in the early 1990s, when founder Scott Malkin launched 'Two Rodeo Drive, Beverly Hills'. A luxury shopping street opposite the Beverley Wiltshire hotel, this area was inspired by European villages, with cobblestone streets and a stairway influenced by the Spanish Steps in Rome. In 1995, the team transported this idea of a luxury shopping street and replicated the model to Oxfordshire, England.

Originally, Bicester Village opened with 13 boutiques and one café. Over the years, the Village has undergone several expansions, most notably in 2017 when 30 new retail units were added. As of 2025, Bicester Village is home to more than 150 boutiques, five restaurants and a handful of pop-up eateries.

== Retail area ==
Bicester Village shopping outlet is designed with a central cobblestone walkway, landscaped planters and pitched-roof façades. It is fully pedestrianised. It generates among the highest sales per square foot of any shopping centre in the world and boasts the world’s only reduced-price Dior boutique.

== Tenants ==
Bicester Village is home to more than 150 boutiques of international brands. Luxury labels, including Bottega Veneta, Burberry, FENDI and Polo Ralph Lauren, which hold retail spaces in the Village.

== Transport connections ==
Bicester Village is served directly by Bicester Village railway station, with Chiltern Railways providing services between London Marylebone and Oxford. From late 2025, Chiltern Railways were to provide a service between Milton Keynes Central and Oxford, calling at Bicester Village, but as of August 2026, this still has not happened. Multiple coach services, including Evan Evans Tours and The Oxford Tube, offer easy transport from locations in central London to Bicester Village. By road, the site is 3 miles (5 km) from Junction 9 of the M40 motorway.

== Awards or recognition ==
Bicester Village has received several awards, including a gold standard certificate at the Thames and Chiltern Bloom awards, one of Europe’s largest horticultural competitions. In 2017, the National Rail Awards also recognised Bicester Village train station as the best small station in Great Britain.
