= British Rail Class 168 =

British diesel multiple unit passenger train

British Rail Class 168 Clubman
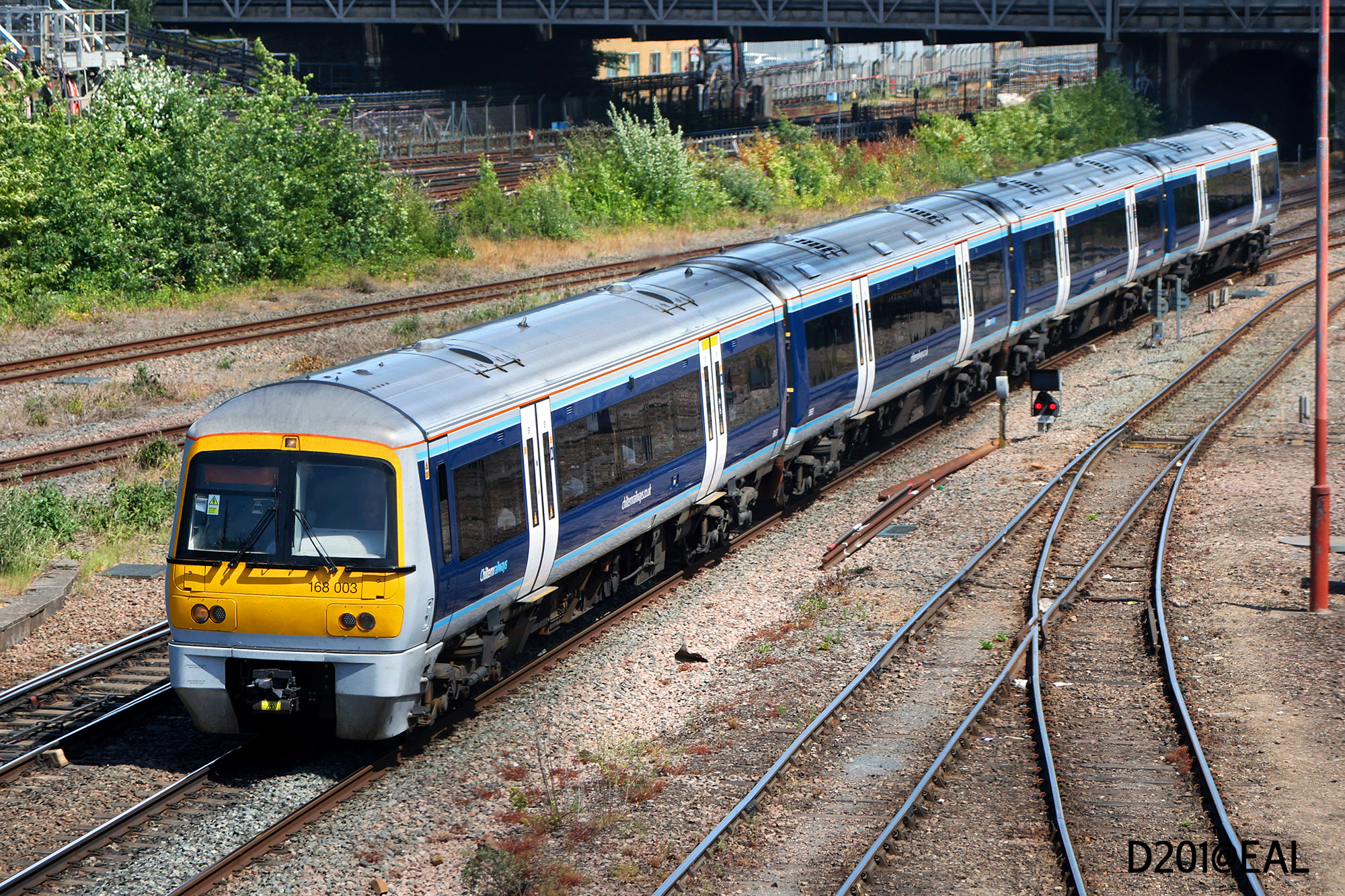
- A Chiltern Railways Class 168/0 in the newest livery

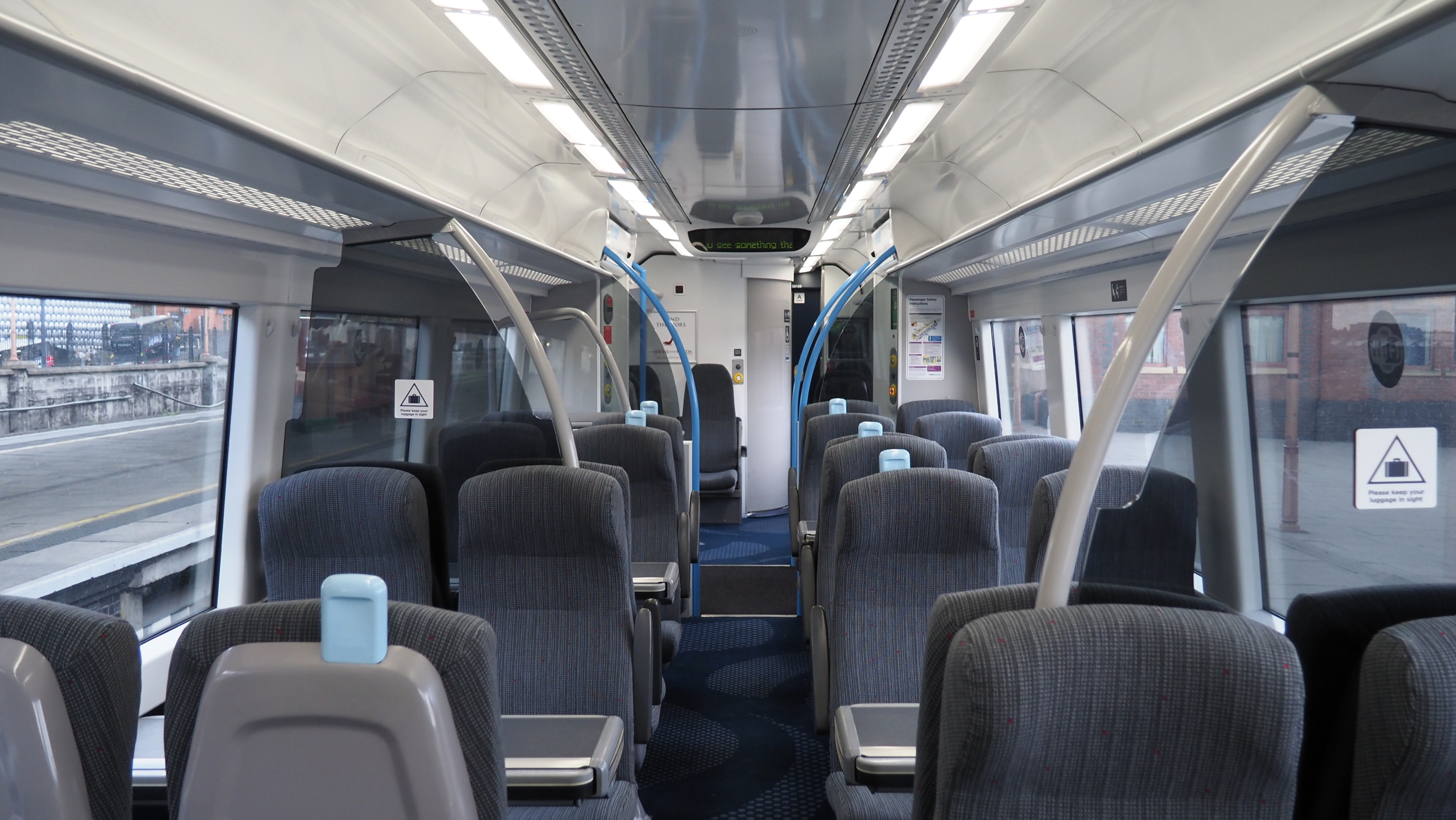
- Post-2024 refurbished Class 168/1 saloon
- In service: 20 May 1998 – present
- Manufacturers: Adtranz; Bombardier Transportation
- Built at: Derby Litchurch Lane Works
- Family name: Clubman, Turbostar
- Constructed: 1998–2004
- Refurbished: 2007–2008; 2024–present
- Number built: 19 (plus 9 converted from Class 170/3)
- Formation: 4 cars per 168/0 unit: DMSL(W)-MSL-MS-DMSL; 3 or 4 cars per 168/1 unit: DMSL(W)-MS-DMSL DMSL(W)-MSL-MS-DMSL; 3 or 4 cars per 168/2 unit: DMSL(W)-MS-DMSL(W) DMSL(W)-MS-MS-DMSL(W); 2 cars per 168/3 unit: DMSL(W)-DMSL
- Fleet numbers: 168/0: 168001–168005; 168/1: 168106–168113; 168/2: 168214–168219; 168/3: 168321–168329
- Capacity: 3-car: 204 seats; 4-car: 272 seats
- Owners: Eversholt Rail Group; Porterbrook
- Operator: Chiltern Railways
- Lines served: Chiltern Main Line, London–Aylesbury line, London–Oxford line, Aylesbury–Princes Risborough line

Specifications
- Car body construction: Welded aluminium, with steel body ends
- Car length: 168/0 DM vehicles: 24.10 m (79 ft 1 in); Other DM vehicles: 23.62 m (77 ft 6 in); Intermediate vehicles: 23.61 m (77 ft 6 in)
- Width: 2.69 m (8 ft 10 in)
- Height: 3.77 m (12 ft 4 in)
- Doors: Double-leaf sliding plug (2 per side per car)
- Maximum speed: 100 mph (160 km/h)
- Prime movers: All units except 168329: 2–4 × MTU 6R 183 TD 13H; Unit 168329: 2 × MTU 6H 1800 R76; (all one per car)
- Engine type: 6R 183: I6 4-stroke turbo-diesel; 6H 1800: same, plus SCR
- Displacement: 6R 183: 13 L (790 cu in); 6H 1800: 12.81 L (782 cu in); (all per engine)
- Power output: 315 kW (422 hp) per engine
- Transmission: All units except 168329: Voith T 211 rzze (hydrokinetic); Unit 168329: ZF EcoWorld 6 AP 2500R; (all one per car)
- Acceleration: 0.5 m/s^{2} (1.1 mph/s)
- Bogies: Adtranz/Bombardier; Powered: P3-23; Unpowered: T3-23
- Braking system: Electro-pneumatic (disc)
- Safety systems: AWS; BR ATP (except 168/3s); TPWS; Tripcock
- Coupling system: BSI
- Multiple working: Within class, and with Class 165
- Track gauge: 1,435 mm (4 ft 8 1/2 in) standard gauge

Notes/references
- Sourced from except where otherwise noted.

The British Rail Class 168 Clubman is a British diesel-hydraulic multiple unit passenger train used on Chiltern Main Line services between London Marylebone and the West Midlands.

The trains were built by Adtranz at the Derby Litchurch Lane Works, in several batches from 1998. The first batch was classified 168/0 under TOPS and resembled the Class 165 units built previously by BREL York. The Networker-design cab was an interim solution pending the design of a completely new cab for further Turbostar batches. Subsequent builds, subclassed as 168/1 and 168/2, were constructed at the same time as Class 165s and thus are part of the Turbostar group of trains.

== History ==
Network SouthEast originally planned the Class 168 for its expansion of service on the Chiltern Main Line to Birmingham Snow Hill or New Street. These units were planned to have a higher top speed of 100 mph (160 km/h) and better acceleration than the Class 165 Networker Turbo DMU trains. In the event, privatisation intervened before Network SouthEast acquired any trains.

In 2023, Chiltern announced the refurbishment of the entire Class 168 fleet, costing £10.7 million. The units are receiving new carpets, reupholstered seats, 5G wi-fi and charging points, as well as a new revised livery. The first unit to be refurbished was unveiled on 10 October 2024.

== Variants ==
Three different variants of the 168 were produced: 168/0, 168/1 and 168/2. Both Classes 168/1 and 168/2 are actually of the same design as the Class 170 Turbostar DMU trains, mainly due to the redesigned cab ends. The nine Class 170s that Chiltern obtained from First TransPennine Express were converted by Brush Traction to operate with the Class 168 fleet and redesignated as Class 168/3. Unit 168329 was converted by Porterbrook into a diesel-battery hybrid. It was tested in 2021 on the Ecclesbourne Valley Railway and entered service as HybridFlex in February 2022. it was reverted back to a regular diesel unit later that year, after operations failed.

== Fleet details ==
Fleet details
Class	Operator	Qty.	Year built	Cars per unit	Unit numbers
168/3	Chiltern Railways	8	2000	2	168321–168328
168/3	Chiltern Railways	1	2000	2	168329 ("HybridFlex" demonstrator)

== Named units ==
The following units been named:

- 168001 Adrian Shooter
- 168215 Marylebone Station 125 Years
