= Saunderton railway station =

Railway station in Buckinghamshire, England

Coordinates: 51.676°N 0.825°W

Saunderton
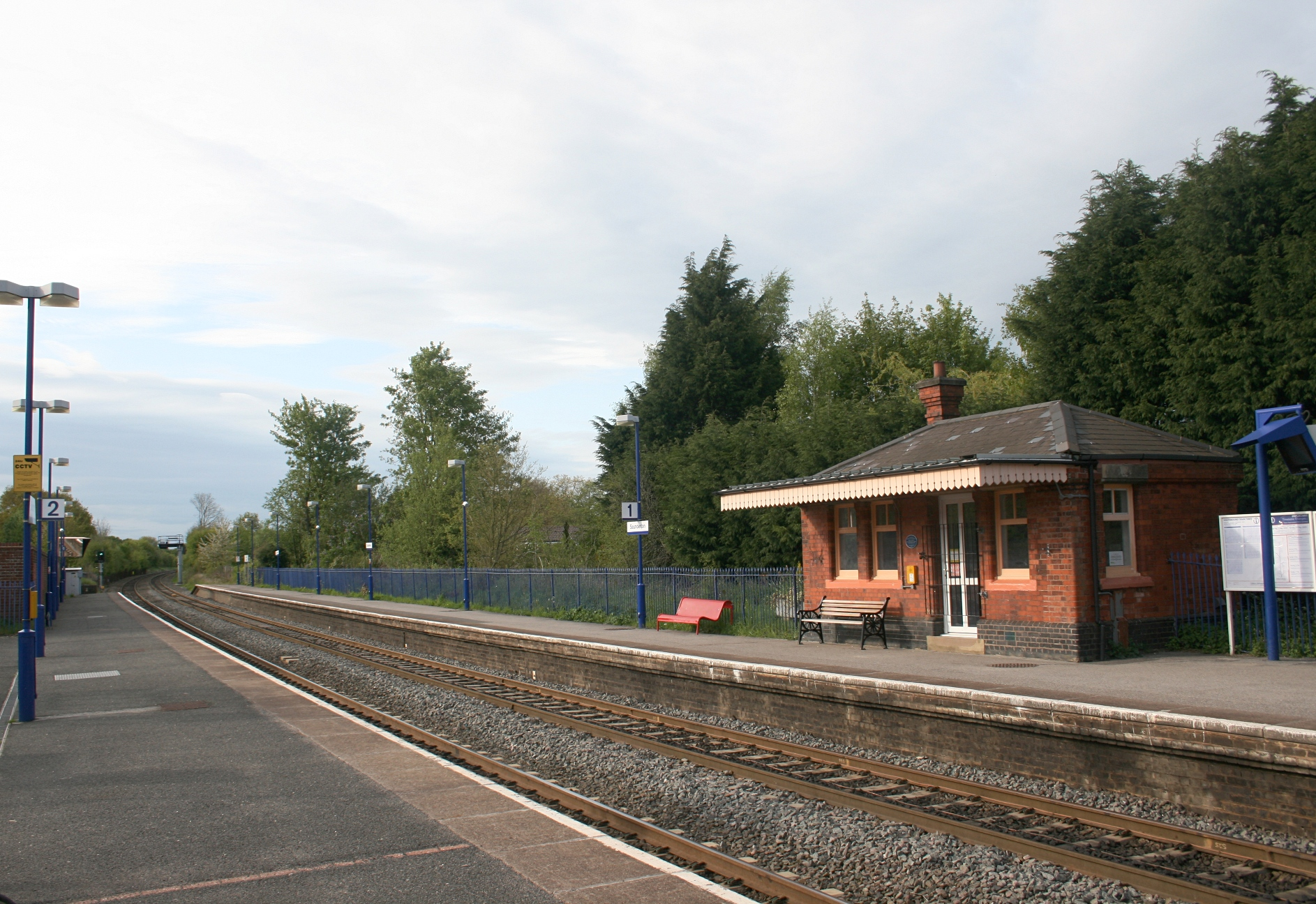
- Saunderton station in May 2009

General information
- Location: Saunderton, Buckinghamshire; England
- Grid reference: SU813981
- Managed by: Chiltern Railways
- Platforms: 2

Other information
- Station code: SDR
- Classification: DfT category F2

History
- Opened: 1 July 1901
- Original company: Great Western Railway
- Pre-grouping: Great Western and Great Central Joint Railway
- Post-grouping: GW & GC Joint

Passengers
- 2020/21: ▼11,092
- 2021/22: ▲42,708
- 2022/23: ▲65,282
- 2023/24: ▲91,288
- 2024/25: ▼69,922
Location
Notes
- Passenger statistics from the Office of Rail and Road

Saunderton railway station is a railway station on the A4010 road between High Wycombe and Princes Risborough, in Buckinghamshire, England. It is located near the villages of Bledlow Ridge and Bradenham, and lies on the Chiltern Main Line between High Wycombe and Princes Risborough stations.

Confusingly, the nucleus of the village of Saunderton, after which the station is named, is about 2.5 miles (4 km) north of the station and is in fact much closer to the nearby Princes Risborough station. The hamlet immediately around the station is also known locally as Saunderton and is indicated as such on nearby road signs, but it is not named on maps.

== History ==
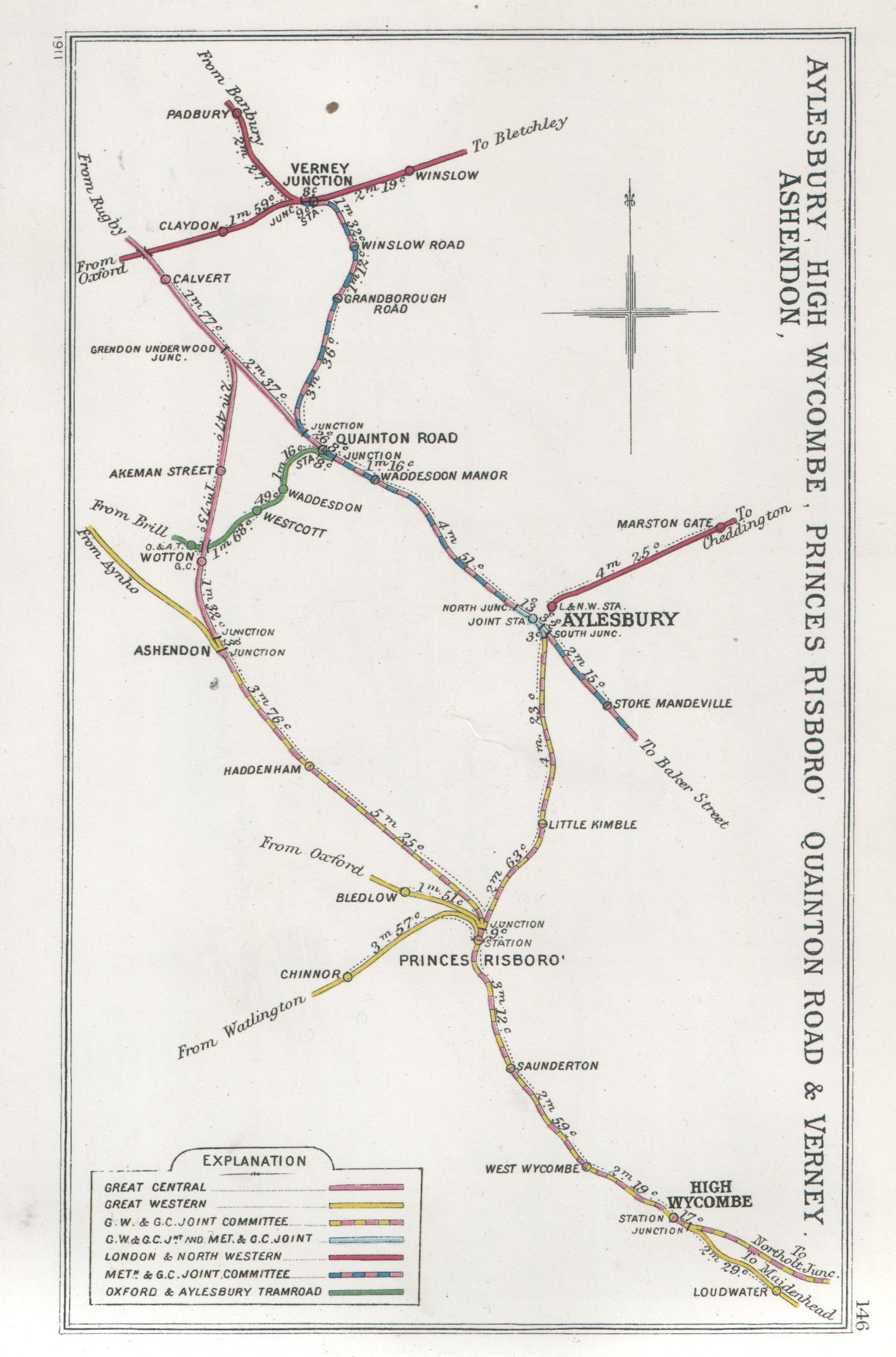
A 1911 Railway Clearing House map of railways in the vicinity of Saunderton

The station was opened on 1 July 1901.

In March 1913 Suffragettes attacked Saunderton station, burning down the main building. Placards reading "Votes for Women" and "Burning to get the Vote" were left on the platform. They may have chosen Saunderton Station because it is near Benjamin Disraeli's birthplace at Bradenham Manor.

The station was transferred from the Western Region of British Rail to the London Midland Region on 24 March 1974.

== Services ==
All services are provided by Chiltern Railways. The typical Monday - Friday off-peak service consists of:

- 1 train per hour to London Marylebone
- 1 train per hour to Oxford

Preceding station	National Rail	Following station
Princes Risborough	Chiltern Railways; London - Birmingham	High Wycombe
	Historical railways	
Princes Risborough; Line open, station open	Great Western Railway; London - Birmingham	West Wycombe; Line open, station closed

== Facilities ==
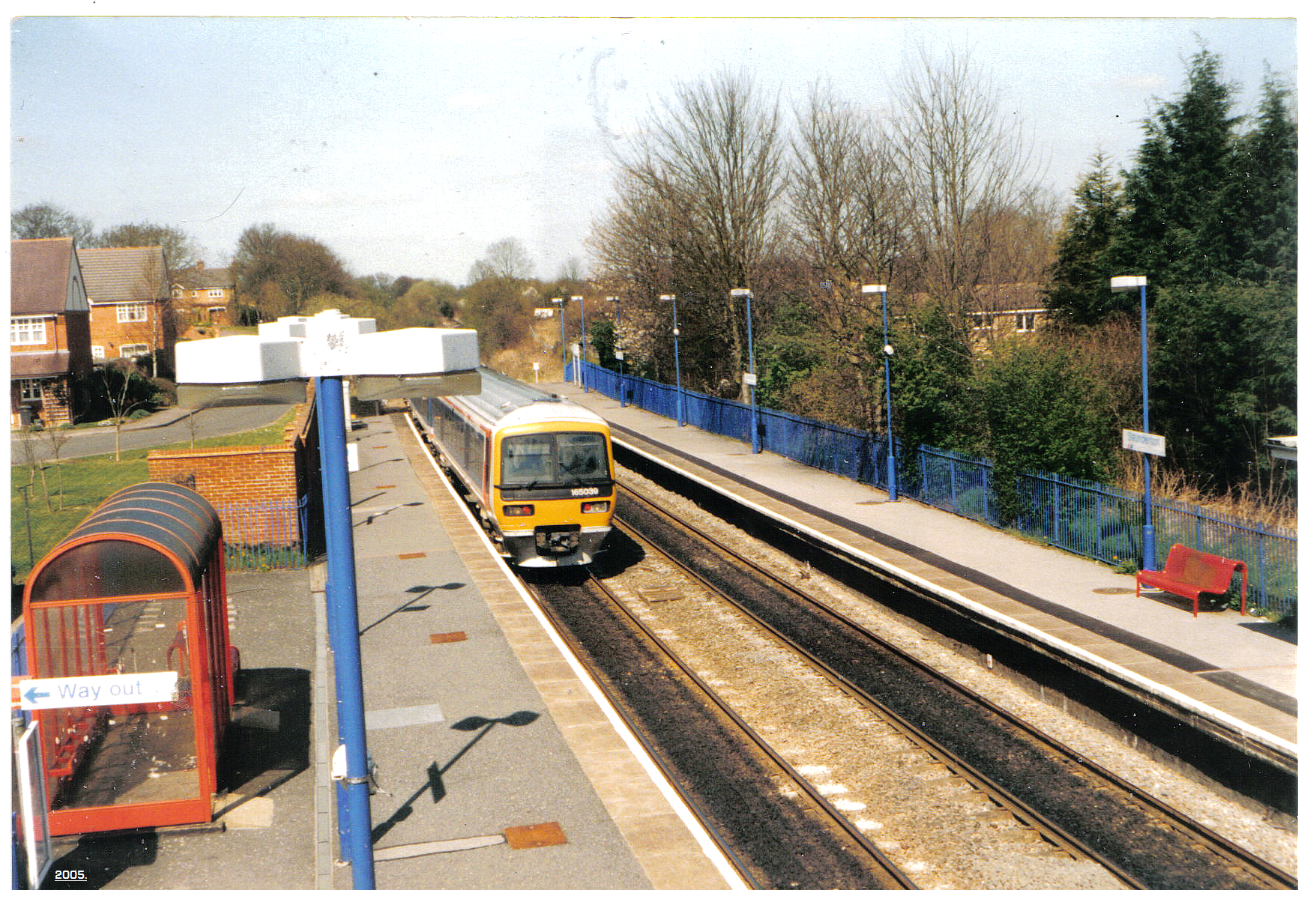
Saunderton station in 2005

The station is unstaffed. There is a (card only) ticket vending machine on the "down" (northbound) platform.

There is an Edwardian waiting room on the "up" (southbound) platform. It contains local information boards and is usually unlocked and locked by local residents for the weekday morning peak-time train services.

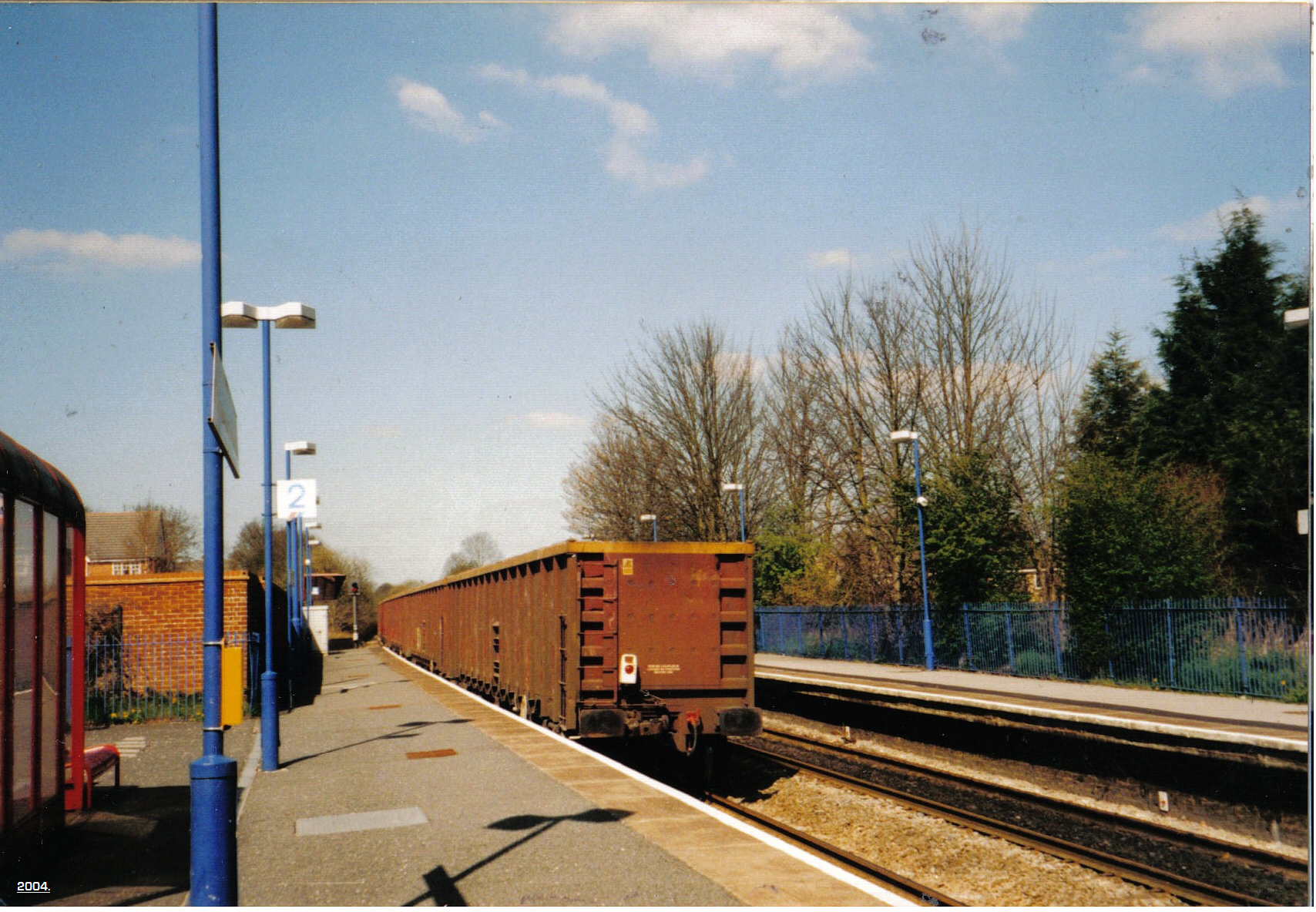
Saunderton station in 2004
