= Seer Green railway station =

Railway station in Buckinghamshire, England

Coordinates: 51.6098°N 0.6079°W

Seer Green and Jordans
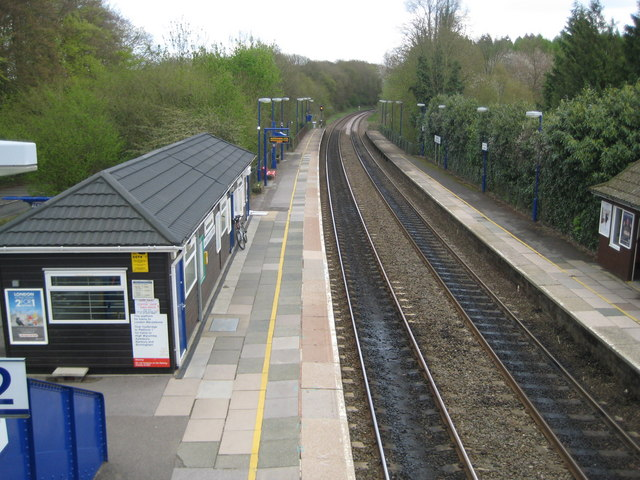

General information
- Location: Seer Green, Buckinghamshire; England
- Grid reference: SU965910
- Manager: Chiltern Railways
- Platforms: 2

Other information
- Station code: SRG
- Classification: DfT category E

Key dates
- 23 December 1914: opened as Beaconsfield Golf Links
- 16 December 1918: renamed Seer Green

Passengers
- 2020/21: ▼19,570
- 2021/22: ▲64,766
- 2022/23: ▲87,952
- 2023/24: ▲93,168
- 2024/25: ▲0.107 million
Notes
- Passenger statistics from the Office of Rail and Road

Seer Green railway station is a railway station near the villages of Seer Green and Jordans in Buckinghamshire, England. The station is on the Chiltern Main Line between Gerrards Cross and Beaconsfield. It is served by Chiltern Railways trains.

== History ==
The station opened to the public on 1 January 1915 on what was the Great Western and Great Central Joint Railway, which had been opened in 1906. It had previously been a private golf platform. The station was originally called Beaconsfield Golf Links Halt due to its close proximity to that golf club, and was renamed Seer Green on 16 December 1918 and Seer Green & Jordans on 25 September 1950 and reverted to Seer Green on 6 May 1974.

The station was transferred from the Western Region of British Rail to the London Midland Region on 24 March 1974.

== Services ==
All services at Seer Green are operated by Chiltern Railways.

The typical off-peak service is one train per hour in each direction between London Marylebone and High Wycombe. Services to and from London operate as stopping services calling at most stations. Additional services call at the station during the peak hours, including express services between London and Oxford which run semi-fast to and from London.

On weekends, northbound services are extended beyond High Wycombe to and from Aylesbury via Princes Risborough.

Preceding station	National Rail	Following station
Beaconsfield	Chiltern Railways Chiltern Main Line	Gerrards Cross
