= Gerrards Cross railway station =

Railway station in Buckinghamshire, England

Coordinates: 51.589°N 0.555°W

Gerrards Cross
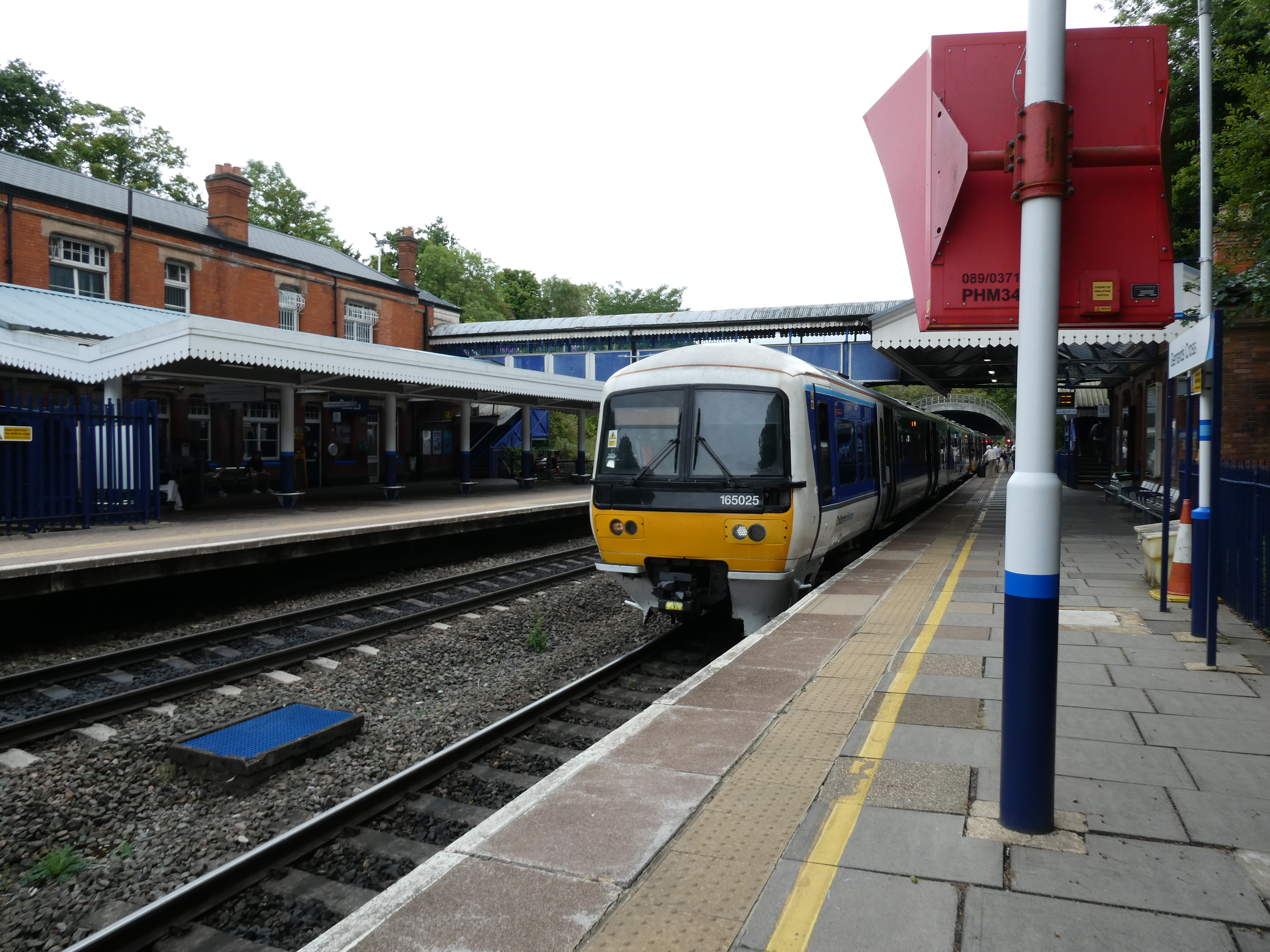
- A Class 165 departing Gerrards Cross in 2025

General information
- Location: Gerrards Cross, Buckinghamshire; England
- Grid reference: TQ001887
- Managed by: Chiltern Railways
- Platforms: 2

Other information
- Station code: GER
- Classification: DfT category D

History
- Opened: 1906

Passengers
- 2020/21: ▼0.200 million
- Interchange: ▼15,530
- 2021/22: ▲0.660 million
- Interchange: ▲45,603
- 2022/23: ▲0.901 million
- Interchange: ▼34,829
- 2023/24: ▲0.959 million
- Interchange: ▼26,817
- 2024/25: ▲1.103 million
- Interchange: ▲31,531
Location
Notes
- Passenger statistics from the Office of Rail and Road

Gerrards Cross railway station is a railway station in the town of Gerrards Cross in Buckinghamshire, England. It is on the Chiltern Main Line between Denham Golf Club and Seer Green and Jordans, 7 miles 18 chains (11.6 km) from Northolt Junction, near South Ruislip. The station has a turn-back siding just west of the station to allow trains to terminate/start at Gerrards Cross. The station is managed by Chiltern Railways, who operate all services.

== History ==
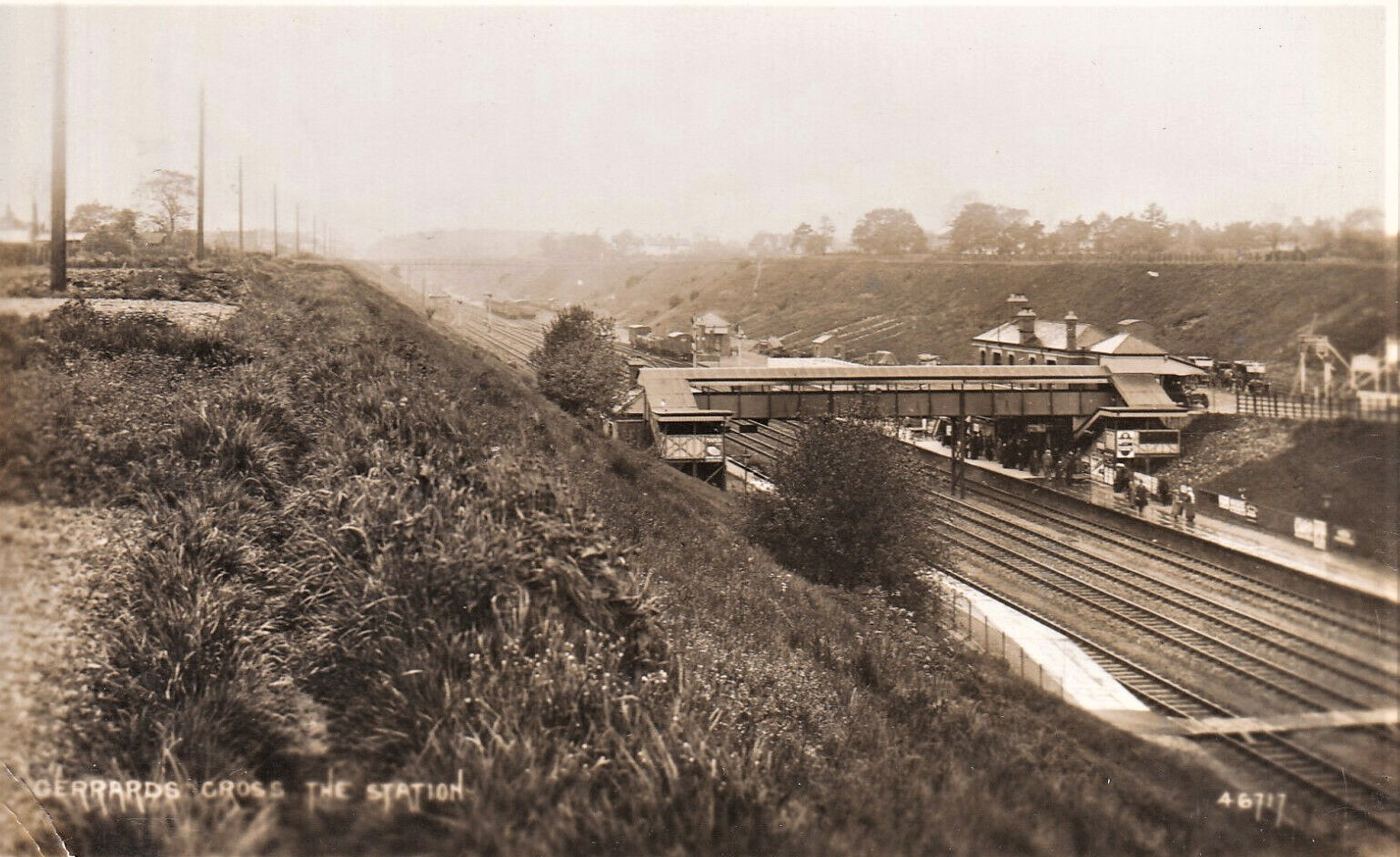
The station seen on a postcard, with the original four-track layout

The station was built as part of the Great Western and Great Central Joint Railway and was opened on 2 April 1906. The line opened after the Chalfont Viaduct was built 1.2 miles (1.9 km) further up the line to traverse the River Misbourne. The station buildings from 1906 are still in use. The opening of the station here meant that the area surrounding the railway became a suburban commuter town, in contrast to the previously rural surroundings.

The original station layout was four-track, with two through roads and two platform roads. The two through roads were disused and removed by the late 1980s. This enabled the Up platform to be extended out and built over what used to be the Up through and platform roads, with the original Up line slewed to the Down through road.

The west signal box was renamed 'Gerrards Cross' and was located on the Down line and remained in use until 11 August 1990 when a total route modernisation was carried out by British Rail and signalling was passed to the new Marylebone Integrated Control Centre.

=== Tunnel collapse ===
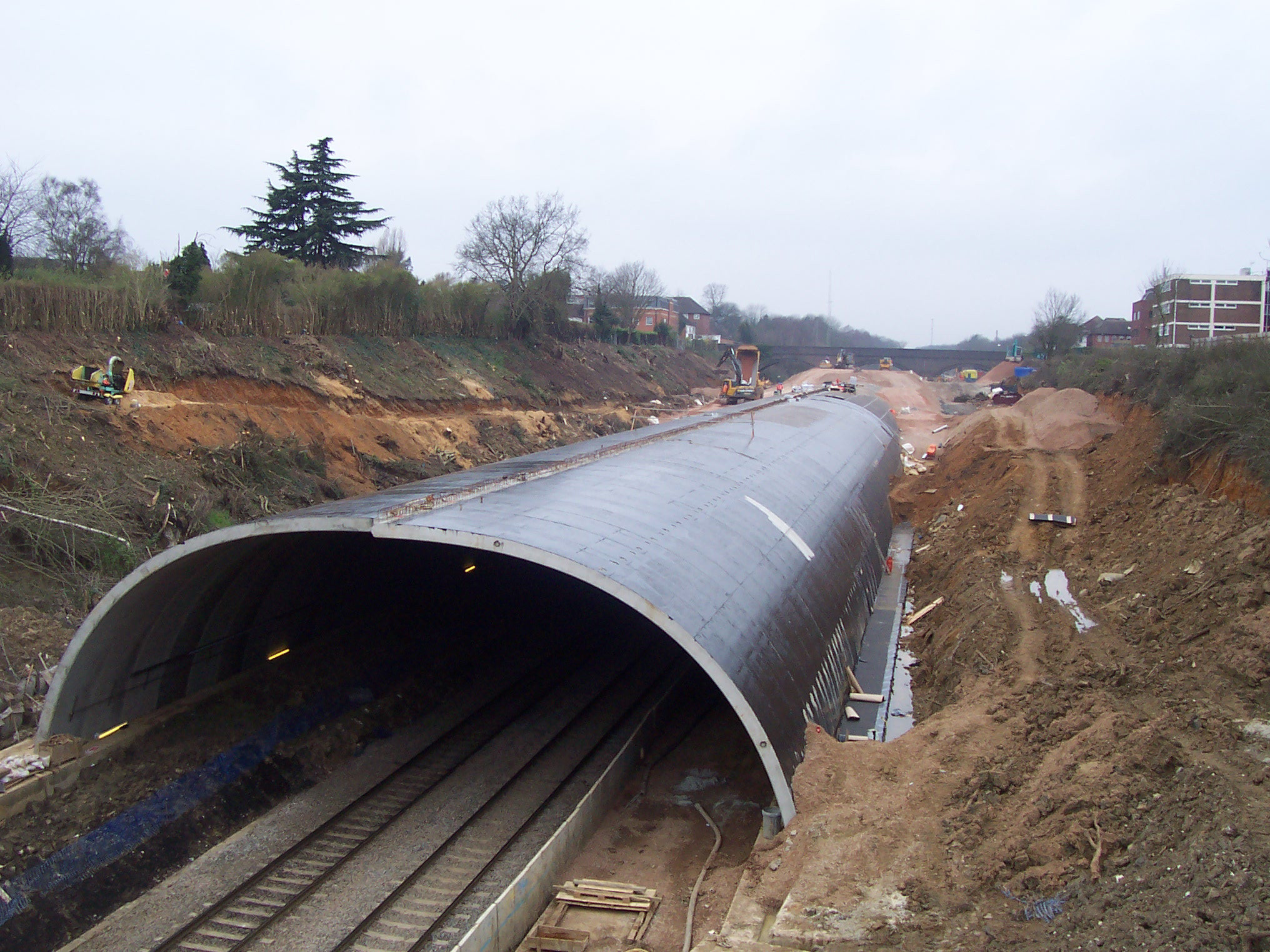
Looking west towards the station from the Marsham Lane bridge in March 2005, showing the extent of construction three months before the tunnel collapsed

At 19:35 on 30 June 2005, 20 metres (66 ft) of the adjacent tunnel near its eastern end collapsed, depositing broken tunnel segment fragments and many tonnes of infill material on the track. News pictures showed that the concrete segments adjoining the hole, which were still in place, appeared to have bowed downwards where two segments met.

Following work on removing infill material and various concrete segments, both those that actually failed and those that were judged unsafe but had not actually collapsed, the trackwork and signalling system were restored. Train services resumed from start of the normal timetable on Saturday 20 August 2005.

== Facilities ==
The station has three car parks, cycle storage, a ticket office and ticket machines, a waiting room, a coffee kiosk, accessible toilets and .live departure screens

Between March and June 2021, the station was refurbished. The work included replacing the canopies, installing lighting across the entire station, repairs to the roof and windows, and a repaint.

== Passenger volume ==
Passenger volume at Gerrards Cross
	2004–05	2005–06	2006–07	2007–08	2008–09	2009–10	2010–11	2011–12	2012–13	2013–14	2014–15	2015–16	2016–17	2017–18	2018–19	2019–20	2020–21	2021–22	2022–23	2023–24	2024–25
Entries and exits	953,108	828,808	1,000,165	1,115,291	1,129,282	1,130,898	1,129,508	1,148,926	1,270,668	1,338,726	1,407,408	1,461,276	1,486,410	1,487,488	1,512,018	1,419,576	199,988	659,832	901,146	959,000	1,102,694
Interchanges	11,199	11,522	11,487	18,829	17,491	21,739	26,892	10,004	67,119	45,038	42,833	58,361	60,445	51,826	59,648	63,553	15,530	45,603	34,829	26,817	31,531

The statistics cover twelve month periods that start in April.

== Services ==
As of the May 2026 timetable, the current service pattern off-peak on weekdays is:

- 3 trains per hour to London Marylebone:
  - 1 is a fast service, calling at London Marylebone only
  - 1 is a semi-fast service, typically calling at Wembley Stadium and London Marylebone
  - 1 is a stopping service, calling at most intermediate stations and London Marylebone
- 2 trains per hour to Oxford
- 1 train per hour to High Wycombe

The current pattern on weekends is largely similar, although the semi-fast trains to Marylebone usually stop at Denham; and the High Wycome trains continue to Aylesbury.

Until December 2012, a single weekday service to London Paddington started from Gerrards Cross, running non-stop from West Ruislip. An equivalent service departed from Paddington, and ran non-stop to Gerrards Cross. These trains traversed the now closed former main line between Northolt Junction and Old Oak Common Junction, in many places reduced to a single track. The service was later truncated to commence at South Ruislip, returning to High Wycombe without stopping at Gerrards Cross.

Preceding station	National Rail	Following station
Seer Green and Jordans	Chiltern Railways; London-Birmingham	Denham Golf Club or Denham
Beaconsfield	Chiltern Railways; London to Oxford services	Wembley Stadium or London Marylebone

== Bibliography ==
- Quick, Michael (2023). Railway Passenger Stations in Great Britain: A Chronology (PDF) (5th ed.). London: Railway and Canal Historical Society.
