= Automatic Train Protection (United Kingdom) =

Railway cab signalling system

Automatic Train Protection (ATP) is a method of beacon based railway cab signalling developed by British Rail. The system was installed on the Great Western Main Line between London Paddington and Bristol Temple Meads, and formerly the Chiltern Main Line from London Marylebone to High Wycombe and Aylesbury.

== History ==
=== Background ===
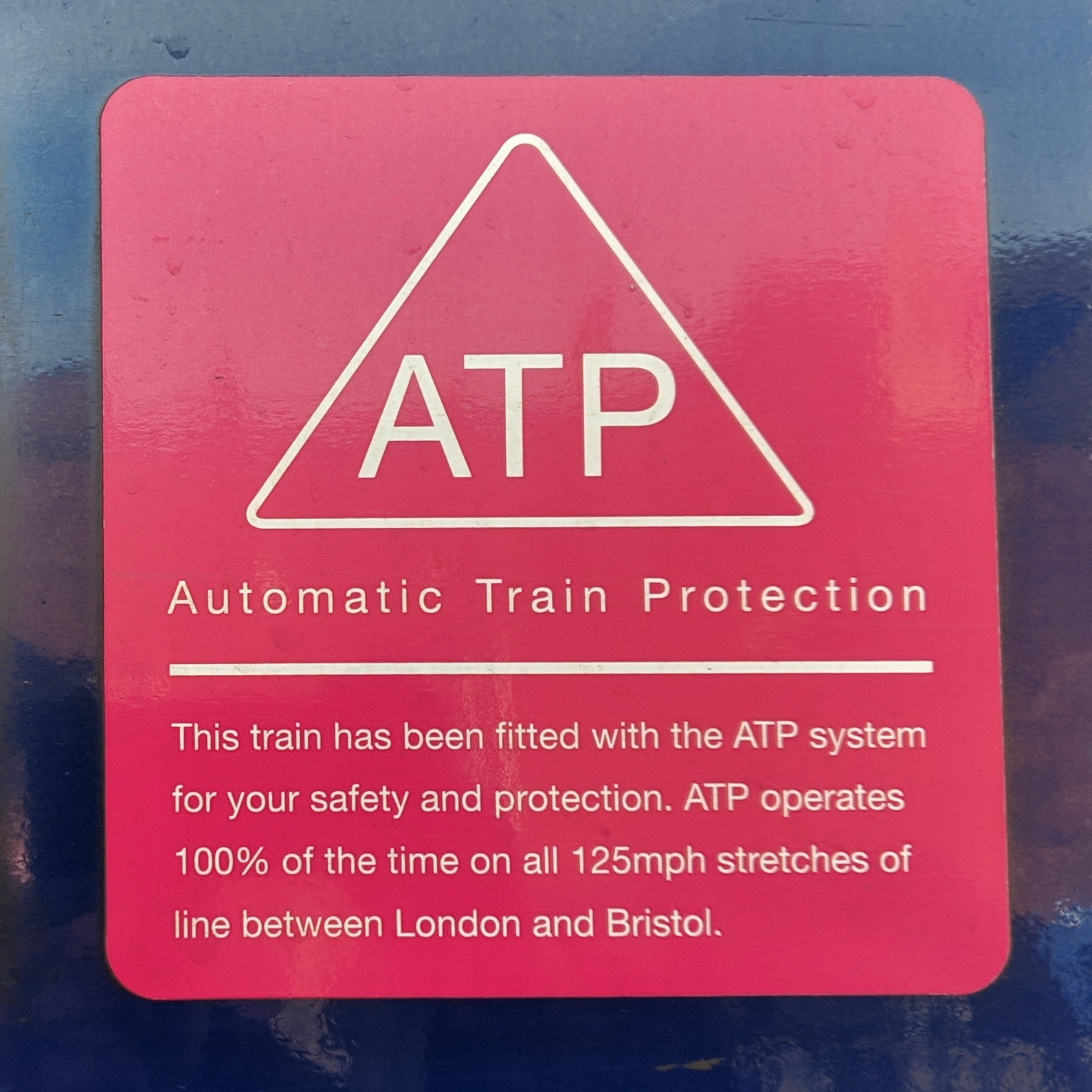
Automatic Train Protection notice on a then First Great Western InterCity 125

A noticeable uptick in signal passed at danger (SPAD) instances in the 1980s led to calls for a new safety system to be adopted that would entirely prevent their occurrence; specifically, the report into the Clapham Junction rail crash (itself not a SPAD accident) specifically stipulated that British Rail (BR) was to fully implement such a system on nationwide basis within five years. From the onset, it was recognised that considerable work would be involved both to develop and deploy the envisioned system.

Accordingly, in 1988, BR launched a three-year program to develop and deploy this new system, with the aim of starting its implementation by 1992. It was assigned the name Automatic Train Protection (ATP), and was a considerably more comprehensive system than the Automatic Warning System (AWS) that was already in operation at that time. Whereas the AWS system only issued alerts to the train's driver, effectively an advisory arrangement that remained open to failure via human error, ATP would instead be able to take control of the train and override the driver to ensure it was driven in accordance with the signalling, as well as other conditions.

As a means of risk mitigation, BR opted to perform two ATP pilot systems, the results from these separate schemes was intended to inform planners on what would be involved in a wider rollout as well as to identify which implementation was superior and thus should be installed nationally. The routes used for the two pilot schemes were London Paddington to Bristol, and London Marylebone to High Wycombe and Aylesbury. Each pilot scheme involved the installation and use of different equipment, nonetheless sharing the same purpose, designation, and numerous other characteristics. The Western scheme used equipment supplied by Ateliers de Constructions Electriques de Charleroi (ACEC), while the Chiltern route was furnished with GEC General Signal-built equipment.

Neither of the trial schemes involved systems that had been designed from scratch. The Western route's ATP was heavily based on Belgium's Transmission balise-locomotive (TBL) system, while the Chiltern route's ATP was adapted from Germany's Linienzugbeeinflussung system, known as SELCAB. Both trials proved to be largely satisfactory in terms of their operations; following a comprehensive safety review process, Chiltern's ATP infrastructure system received independent safety assurance and thus changed from being a pilot system to being a regular system that was fully usable.

=== Scale-back ===
At the onset of ATP's development, there was an expressed recommendation to expand its coverage across Britain's rail network within half a decade; at one point, BR's management declared that ATP was to be installed on "a large percentage of its network". Railtrack, the agency that took over the management of Britain's railway infrastructure from BR in 1994, subsequently only committed to completion of the two pilot schemes, adaptation for new high-speed lines, and to search for a cheaper alternative for the rest of the network.

One of the alternate schemes that was jointly explored by Railtrack and the train operators was Signal Passed At Danger (SPAD) Reduction And Mitigation (SPADRAM), the principal outcome of which was the Train Protection & Warning System (TPWS). TPWS automatically stops trains that pass red signals or speed restrictions at too high a speed, but does not monitor speed constantly, hence only mitigating SPADs, rather than wholly preventing them. In comparison to ATP, it was a considerably cheaper system that was able to achieve 70 per cent of the same preventable risk as ATP. Following an evaluation period, it was determined that TPWS was more cost effective than ATP, thus railway planners opted to roll out TPWS instead. The complete fitout of TPWS to all trains, and over 12,000 signals, 650 buffer stops, and around 1,000 permanent speed restrictions, was completed by December 2003; there was a significant reduction in SPADs observed in the years thereafter.

The total cost of ATP was at one stage estimated to be £750 million, equivalent to £1.131 billion in 2020. In 1994, British Rail and Railtrack estimated that a comprehensive deployment scheme would come at a cost of £14 million (£27 million today) per life saved, compared to the £4 million per life which they considered to be good value for money. A Health and Safety Commission report later estimated a full installation of ATP would cost £11 million per life saved, or £5 million if only installed at high-risk locations; Railtrack stated that it concurred with these figures. The high cost of the scheme was a major factor in the decision against ATP's further deployment.

=== Later use and phase out ===
While the planned national rollout of ATP was permanently abandoned, the two trial schemes proved suitable for full and regular use. Under the Railway Safety Regulations 1999 (RSR1999), which came into in force in January 2000, requires infrastructure and train operators to permit only trains with train protection equipment fitted to operate and, wherever it was reasonably practicable to fit ATP, the system had to be operational. As such, both the Chiltern and Western ATP systems have remained in service alongside TPWS for multiple decades.

The Chiltern route's SELCAB ATP equipment was initially supported by Alcatel and subsequently by Thales. However, due to its nature as a bespoke, complex, and unique systems, it was considered to be difficult to keep operational for beyond its first decade of operation. During 2011, roughly 21 years after ATP's instigation, Thales issued a formal advisory that the SELCAB system was to be declared obsolete within the near future. The announcement motivated railway managers to perform large final purchases of spare equipment and components so that there was sufficient stock to sustain ATP's infrastructure and fleet fitment alike for the medium term. In spite of a life extension programme performed during the 2010s, the decommissioning of ATP was viewed as inevitable as a long term outcome.

According to railway industry periodical Rail Engineer, by 2020, the availability of ATP was at considerable risk of becoming unsustainable. The European Train Control System (ETCS) has been viewed as a natural replacement to ATP, which is gradually being rolled out across the British rail network as its principal signalling solution. While ETCS is planned to be operational on the Chiltern route by around 2035, it was not realistic to expect ATP to remain viable until then. It was concluded that, with enhancements, TPWS was capable of replacing ATP as a bridging measure without much loss in functionality. This substitution required an exemption from RSR1999 stipulations by regulatory authorities along with a review of all existing TPWS installations along the Chiltern route, with upgrades being performed where relevant. As of 2025, ATP has been removed from the Chiltern route.

== Function and operation ==
The aim of ATP is to prevent trains from both exceeding speed restrictions, and from passing signals at danger. The system is beacon based, with information transmitted to the train at fixed intervals via stationary beacons at key points along the line. The on board computer takes track and signal information from the beacons, and calculates the maximum speed of the train. When the maximum permitted speed decreases, such as when approaching a signal at danger, three braking curves are calculated: the indication curve, which is the ideal deceleration to the new limit; the warning curve, 3 miles per hour (4.8 km/h) above the indication curve, which causes a warning to the driver; and the intervention curve, 6 miles per hour (9.7 km/h) above the indication curve. At this point, the train will apply the brakes automatically.

ATP can be deployed either as a continuous system or intermittently. While a continuous ATP system would be constantly communicating with each train throughout its journey, an intermittent arrangement could only communicate with a train when it was at specific fixed locations along the track where data could be transmitted; such locations would normally be around signals, junctions, and locations between signals that had been identified as being high-risk. Thus, intermittent ATP is normally viewed as an add-on to conventional lineside signals. The Chiltern route's ATP system, known as SELCAB, can also supervise train speeds around Permanent Speed Restrictions (PSRs) and pre-programmed Temporary Speed Restrictions (TSRs), but not Emergency Speed Restrictions (ESRs); in contrast, the Western route's ATP system is not capable of this level of speed supervision.
