= Beaconsfield railway station (England) =

Railway station in Buckinghamshire, England

Coordinates: 51.6115°N 0.6437°W

Beaconsfield
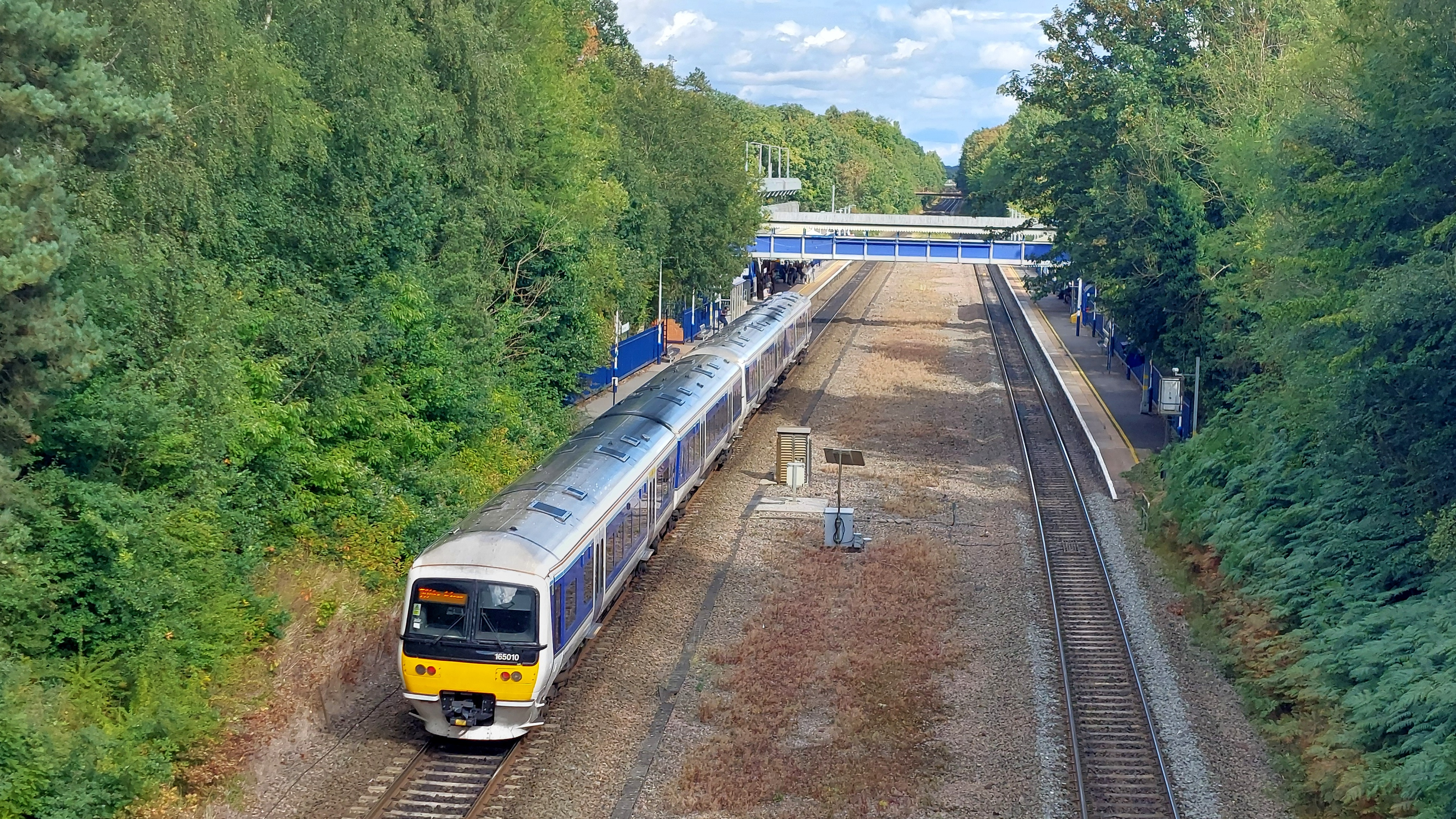
- Beaconsfield station in August 2025

General information
- Location: Beaconsfield, Buckinghamshire; England
- Grid reference: SU940911
- Manager: Chiltern Railways
- Platforms: 2

Other information
- Station code: BCF
- Classification: DfT category D

History
- Opened: 1906

Passengers
- 2021/22: ▲0.727 million
- 2022/23: ▲0.965 million
- 2023/24: ▲1.043 million
- 2024/25: ▲1.147 million
- 2025/26: ▲1.194 million
Location
Notes
- Passenger statistics from the Office of Rail and Road

Beaconsfield railway station is a railway station in the market town of Beaconsfield in Buckinghamshire, England. It is on the Chiltern Main Line between Seer Green and Jordans and High Wycombe stations. It is served by Chiltern Railways.

== History ==
The station was opened on 2 April 1906 as part of the Great Western and Great Central Joint Railway. The station layout was four tracks, with two through lines and two platform lines. British Rail removed the through lines early in 1974. The station was transferred from the Western Region of British Rail to the London Midland Region on 24 March 1974.

As part of Chiltern Railways' Project Evergreen 2, the platform lines were upgraded to increase the line speed for through trains from 40 mph (64 km/h) to 75 mph (121 km/h). and, in October 2007, work began on installing ticket barriers, which became operational on 10 March 2008.

In the early 2000s the station car park was made into a two-storey car park. In March 2008 the upper deck was closed for work to start on adding a third storey. This opened on 1 September 2008, increasing the total parking spaces to 696.

== Services ==
All trains are operated by Chiltern Railways. The current off-peak services are:

- 3 trains per hour to London Marylebone, of which:
  - 1 calls at Gerrards Cross only
  - 1 calls at Gerrards Cross and Wembley Stadium only
  - 1 is a stopping service, calling at most intermediate stations
- 1 train per hour to High Wycombe
- 2 trains per hour to Oxford

Preceding station	National Rail	Following station
Gerrards Cross	Chiltern Railways London–Oxford	High Wycombe
Seer Green & Jordans	Chiltern Railways Chiltern Main Line stopping services	High Wycombe

== Image gallery ==
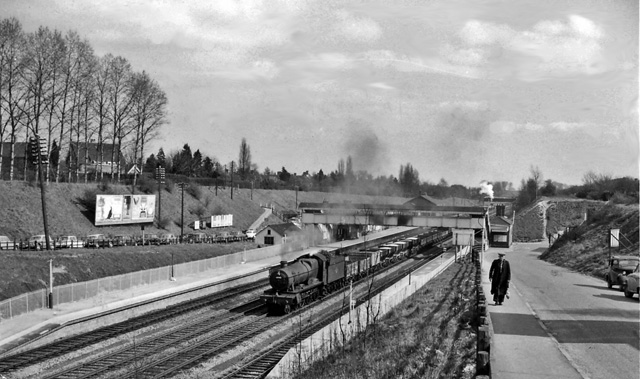
The station in 1961

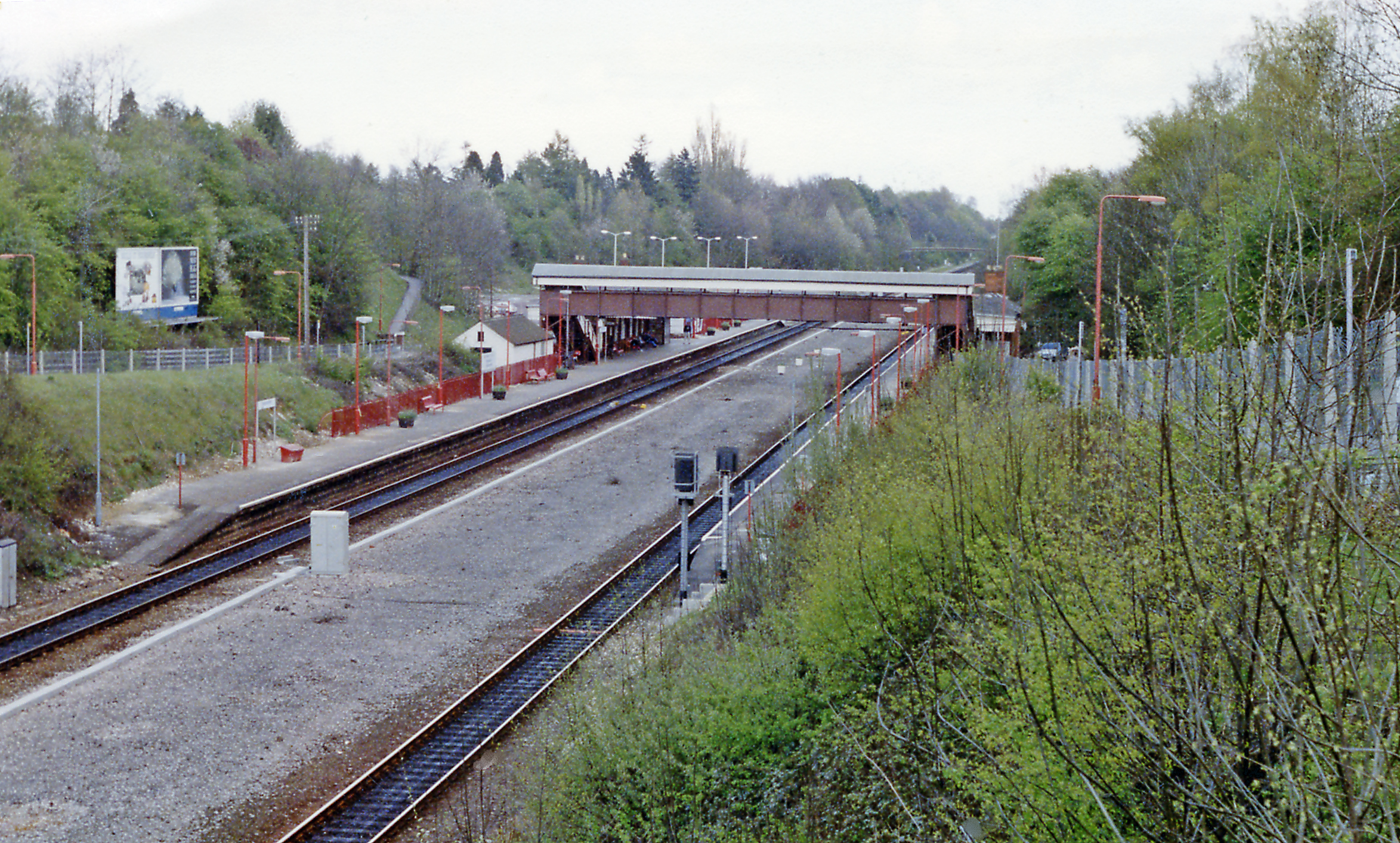
View eastwards towards London

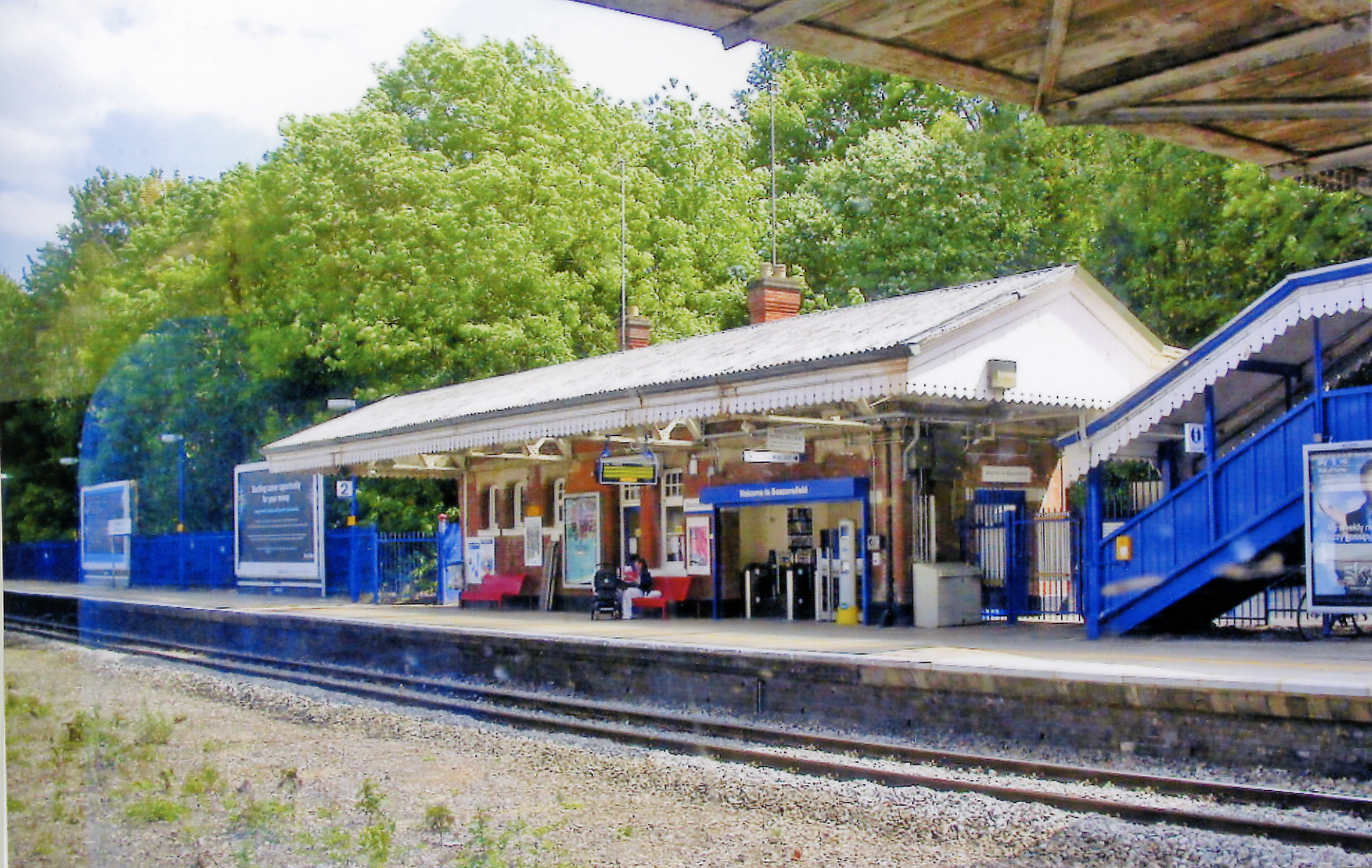
Beaconsfield station, Down platform

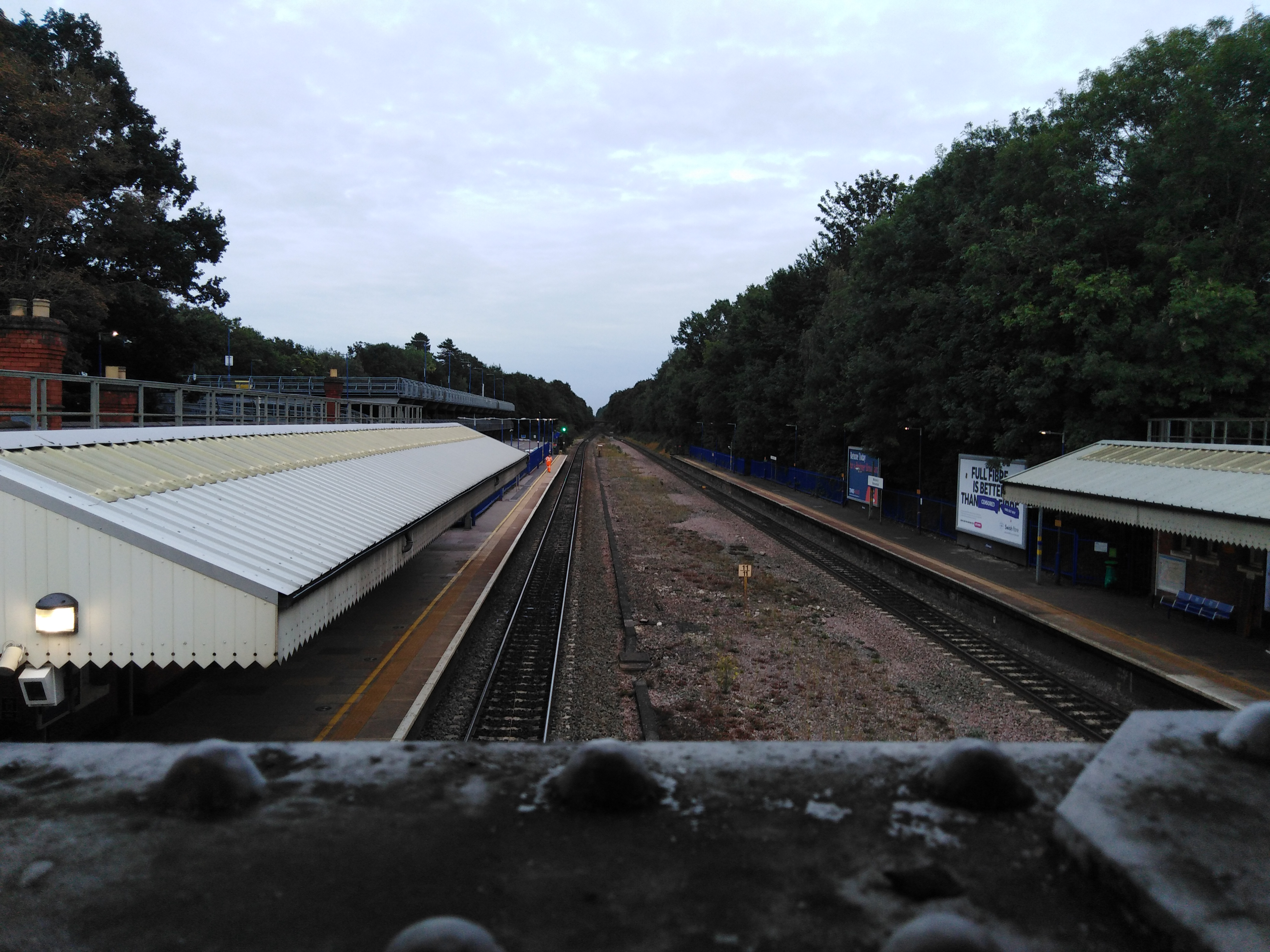
Beaconsfield station looking in the Up Direction from the footbridge

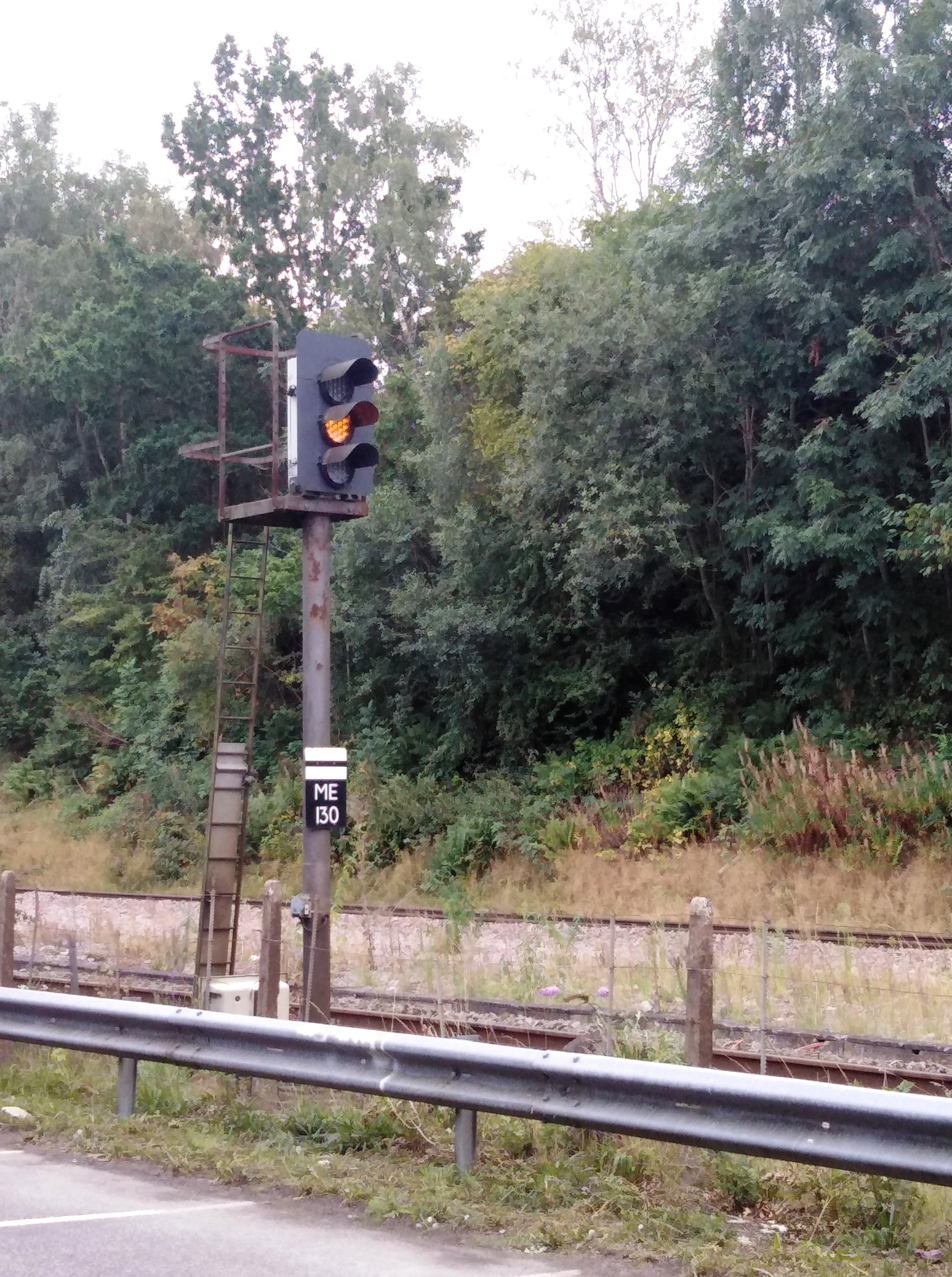
A caution signal at ME 130 at Beaconsfield Station

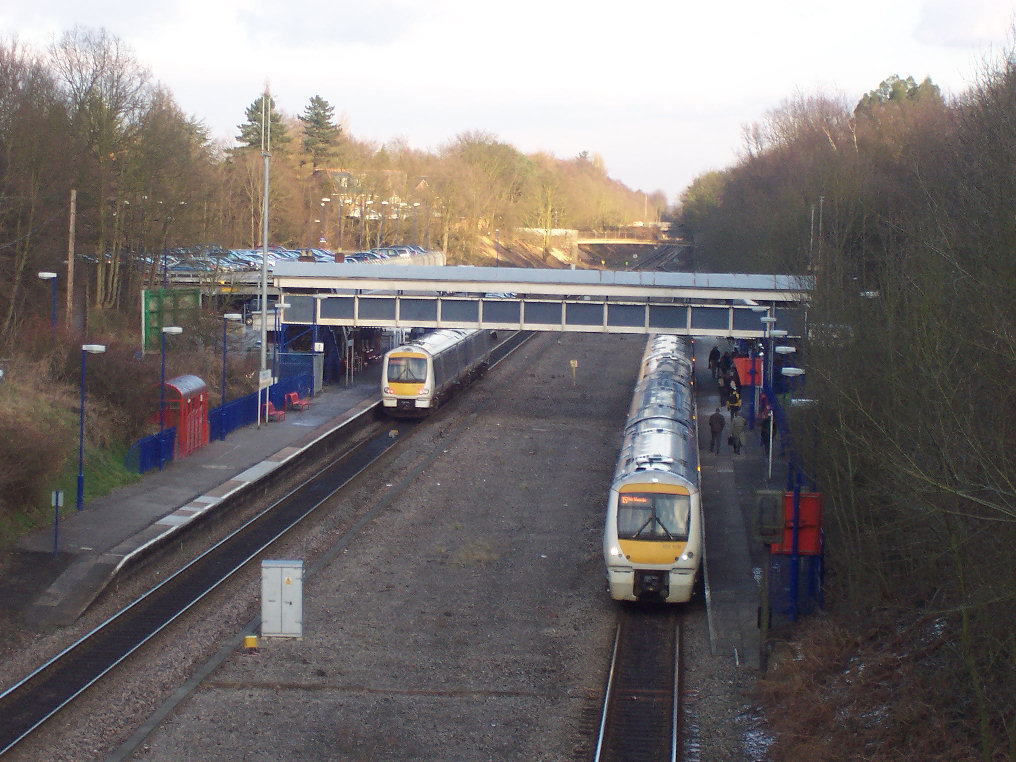
Beaconsfield station in June 2006
