= Total route modernisation =

Method of railway modernisation

Total route modernisation is a concept first introduced by British Railways whereby a particular railway route is upgraded in one "big bang", with track, signalling and often stations and rolling stock all being renewed or modernised simultaneously in a multifaceted programme of works.

This is in contrast to the more traditional process under which a line of route is gradually improved over time with a series of piecemeal incremental upgrades, such as electrifying a line while leaving the signalling as it is, or easing out bottleneck junctions one at a time, or gradually raising line speeds by individual bits of track realignment over different stretches of line over a long period, as had been the typical approach over many decades on, notably, the East Coast Main Line.

An example of total route modernisation was that of the Chiltern Main Line carried out by British Rail's Network SouthEast sector. Under this scheme, mechanical semaphore signals were replaced with new colour-light signalling, a new fleet of Class 165 "Chiltern Turbo" diesel trains was introduced, Automatic Train Protection was fitted, line speeds were raised, and stations refurbished. This work took four years in all, and was completed in 1992.
