= Chiltern Main Line =

British railway line

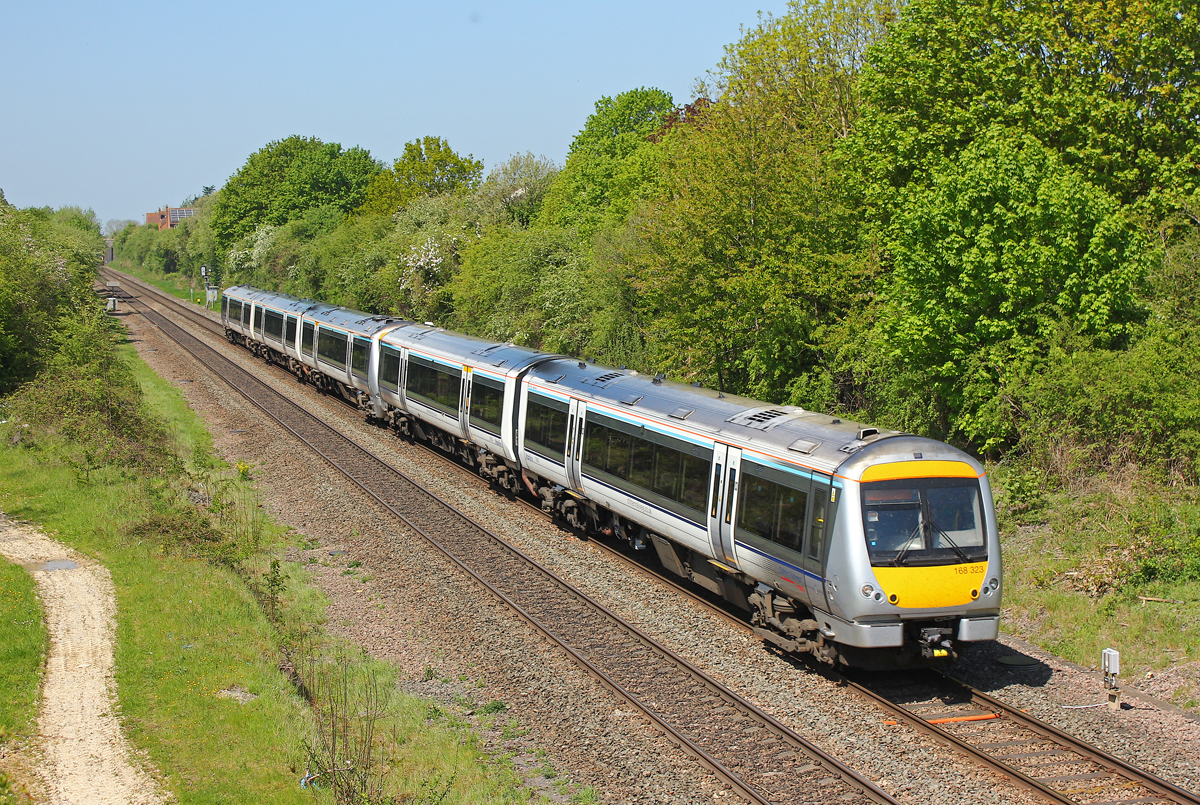
- A Class 168 at Haddenham

Overview
- Status: Operational
- Owner: Network Rail
- Locale: Greater London; South East England; East Midlands; West Midlands
- Termini: London Marylebone; Birmingham Snow Hill
- Stations: 32

Service
- Type: Commuter rail, Heavy rail
- System: National Rail
- Operators: Chiltern Railways; West Midlands Trains (in part); CrossCountry (in part); GWR (in part)
- Rolling stock: Class 68 & Mk 5A Coaches; Class 165 Networker Turbo; Class 168 Clubman; Class 172 Turbostar; Class 220 Voyager; Class 221 Super Voyager

History
- Opened: 1910 (complete line)

Technical
- Line length: 112 mi 4 chains (180 km)
- Number of tracks: 2
- Track gauge: 4 ft 8 1/2 in (1,435 mm) standard gauge
- Operating speed: 100 mph (160 km/h) maximum
Route map
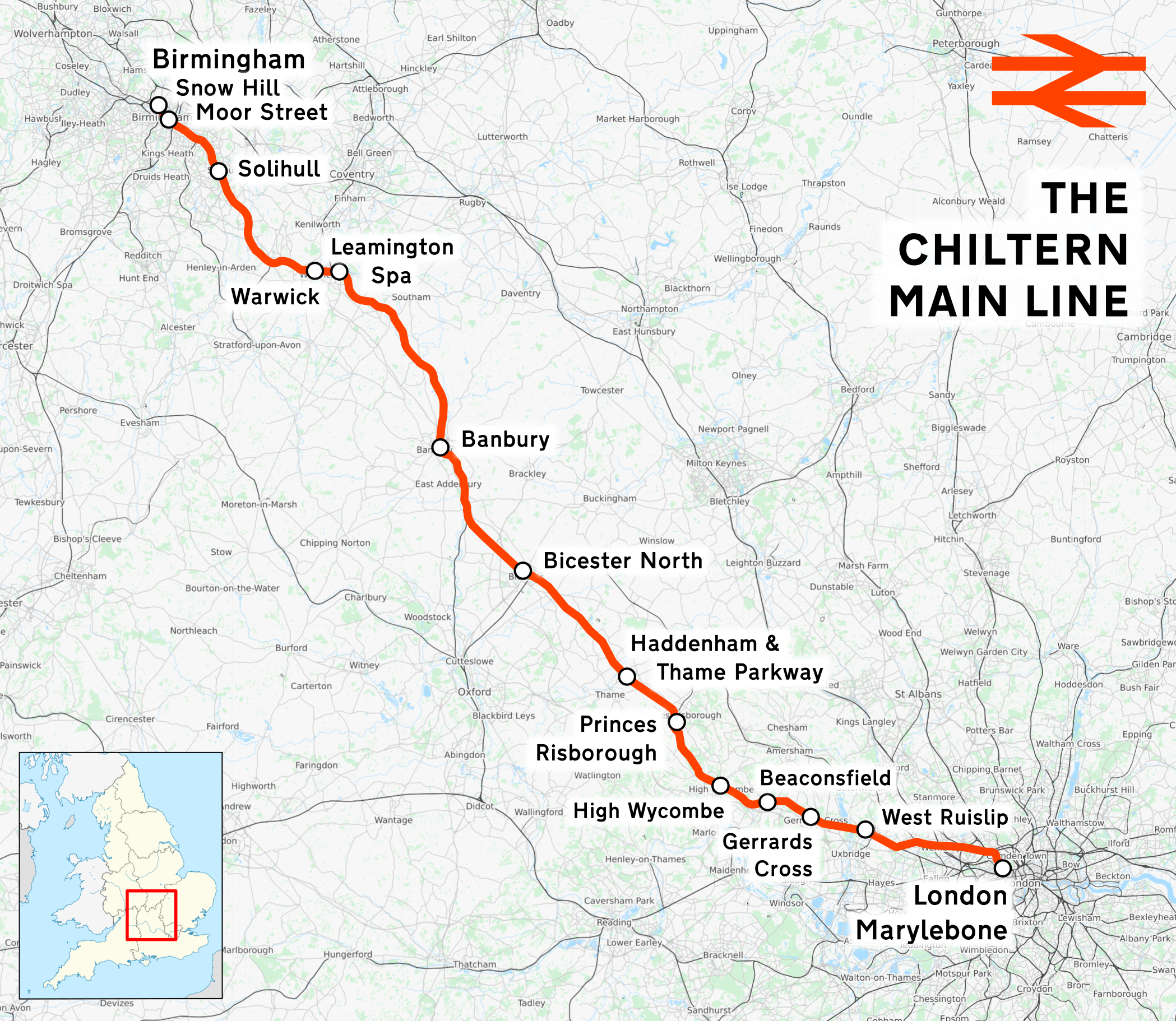
(Click to expand)

The Chiltern Main Line is a railway line which links London (Marylebone) and Birmingham (Moor Street and Snow Hill) on a 112-mile (180 km) route via High Wycombe, Bicester, Banbury, Leamington Spa and Solihull in England.

It is currently one of two main line railway routes between London and Birmingham; the other is the West Coast Main Line between London Euston and Birmingham New Street, which is the principal inter-city route between the two cities. A third main line, High Speed 2, is currently under construction.

The name Chiltern Line was invented as a marketing name for the line by Network SouthEast in 1985, with reference to the Chiltern Hills that the route passes through near its southern end. The route was originally part of the Great Western Railway's main line from London Paddington to Birmingham Snow Hill, Wolverhampton Low Level and Birkenhead Woodside. Most main line services between London and Birmingham on this route were discontinued in 1967 after the West Coast Main Line was electrified, and Snow Hill station was closed.

Services were resumed between London and the reopened Snow Hill in 1993; however, they were routed into Marylebone, formerly the London terminus of the now-closed Great Central Main Line, instead of the historic terminus at Paddington.

Since the privatisation of British Rail in the 1990s, the main operator has been Chiltern Railways, which has continued to develop the route and services. In the early 2010s, the line underwent a major upgrade which saw much of the line cleared for 100 mph (160 km/h) running, resulting in significant reductions in journey times from 2013. The line is not electrified, although electrification is an aspiration.

The line forms part of the suburban rail networks in both cities. The majority of towns towards the London end of the route are prosperous suburbs or commuter-belt towns, such as Ruislip, Gerrards Cross and Beaconsfield; these have a journey time of 30 minutes or less to London Marylebone. In the West Midlands, it is one of the Snow Hill Lines. Commuter trains operated by West Midlands Trains run between Birmingham Snow Hill, Solihull and Leamington Spa, also to Stratford-upon-Avon.

== History ==
=== Early history and construction ===
What is now the Chiltern Main Line was built in three key phases by the Great Western Railway (GWR) between 1852 and 1910:

- The first phase was the Birmingham and Oxford Junction Railway opened in 1852. The route ran from London Paddington to Birmingham Snow Hill; in 1854, it was extended to Wolverhampton Low Level and, connecting with other GWR lines, became the southern leg of a longer distance route to Shrewsbury, Chester and Birkenhead. It ran via the Great Western Main Line to Didcot and then via Oxford, Banbury and Leamington Spa. This route was circuitous and was 16 miles (26 km) longer between London and Birmingham than the rival London and North Western Railway's Euston-New Street route via Rugby, meaning that the GWR could not compete on journey times.
- The second phase was completed in 1906. In order to create a more direct route, the GWR collaborated with the Great Central Railway (GCR) to create a new railway known as the Great Western and Great Central Joint Railway between Northolt (in north-west London) and Ashendon Junction (west of Aylesbury) via High Wycombe.
- Thirdly, as a final development, the GWR opened the Bicester cut-off line in 1910; this was an 18 1/4 mi (29.4 km) connection between the Great Western and Great Central Joint Railway at Ashendon Junction, via Bicester North, to Aynho Junction on the Birmingham line south of Banbury. This shortened the route between London and Birmingham by 18 1/2 miles (29.8 km), compared to the original Oxford route, and reduced the fastest London-Birmingham journey times by 20 minutes (from 140 to 120 minutes). Most of the through trains were immediately transferred to the new route, although the original route via Oxford continued in use and is now known as the Cherwell Valley line.

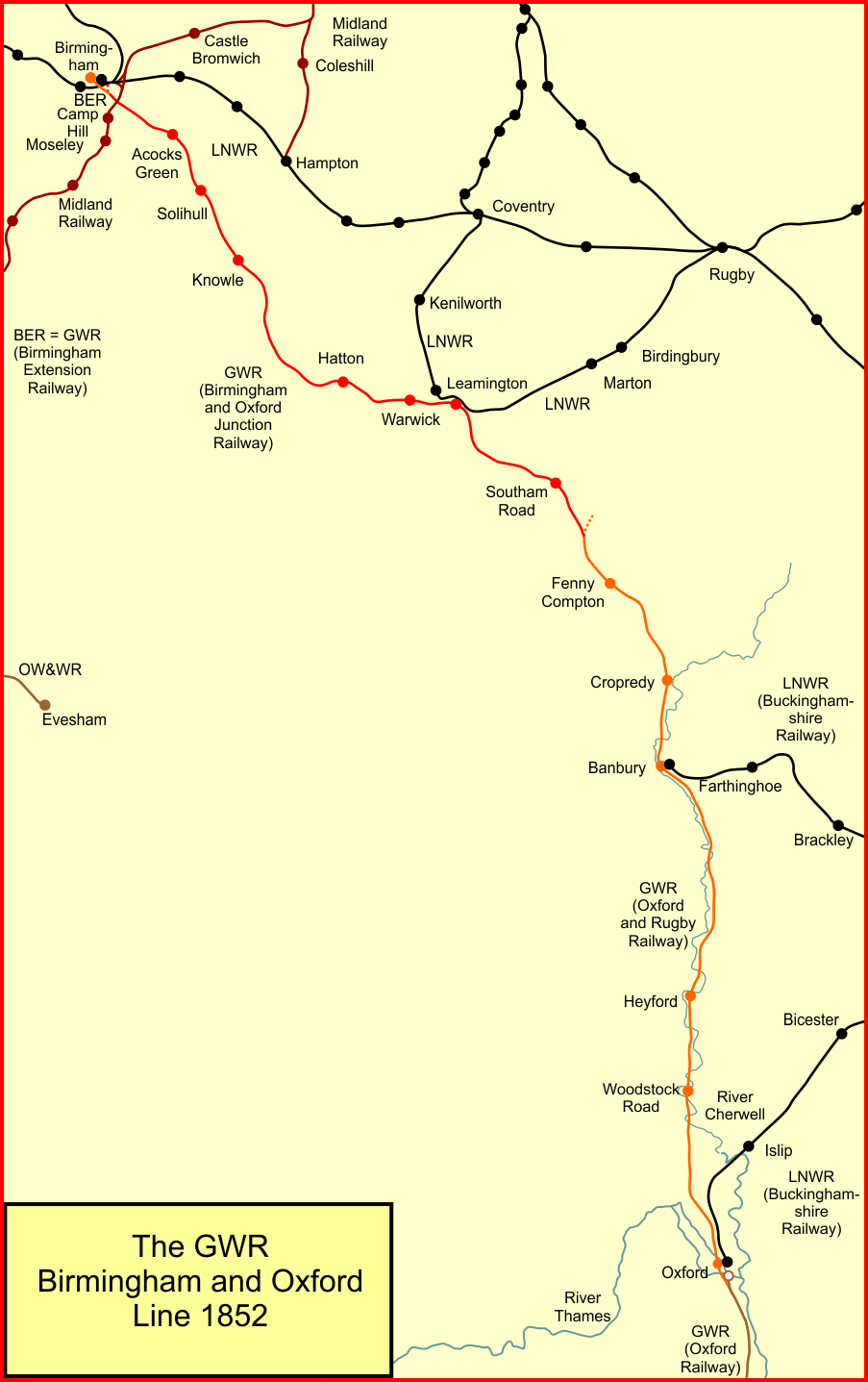
The Birmingham and Oxford Junction Railway as built in 1852. Prior to the construction of the Bicester cut-off line in 1910, London to Birmingham trains had to run on the circuitous route via Oxford.

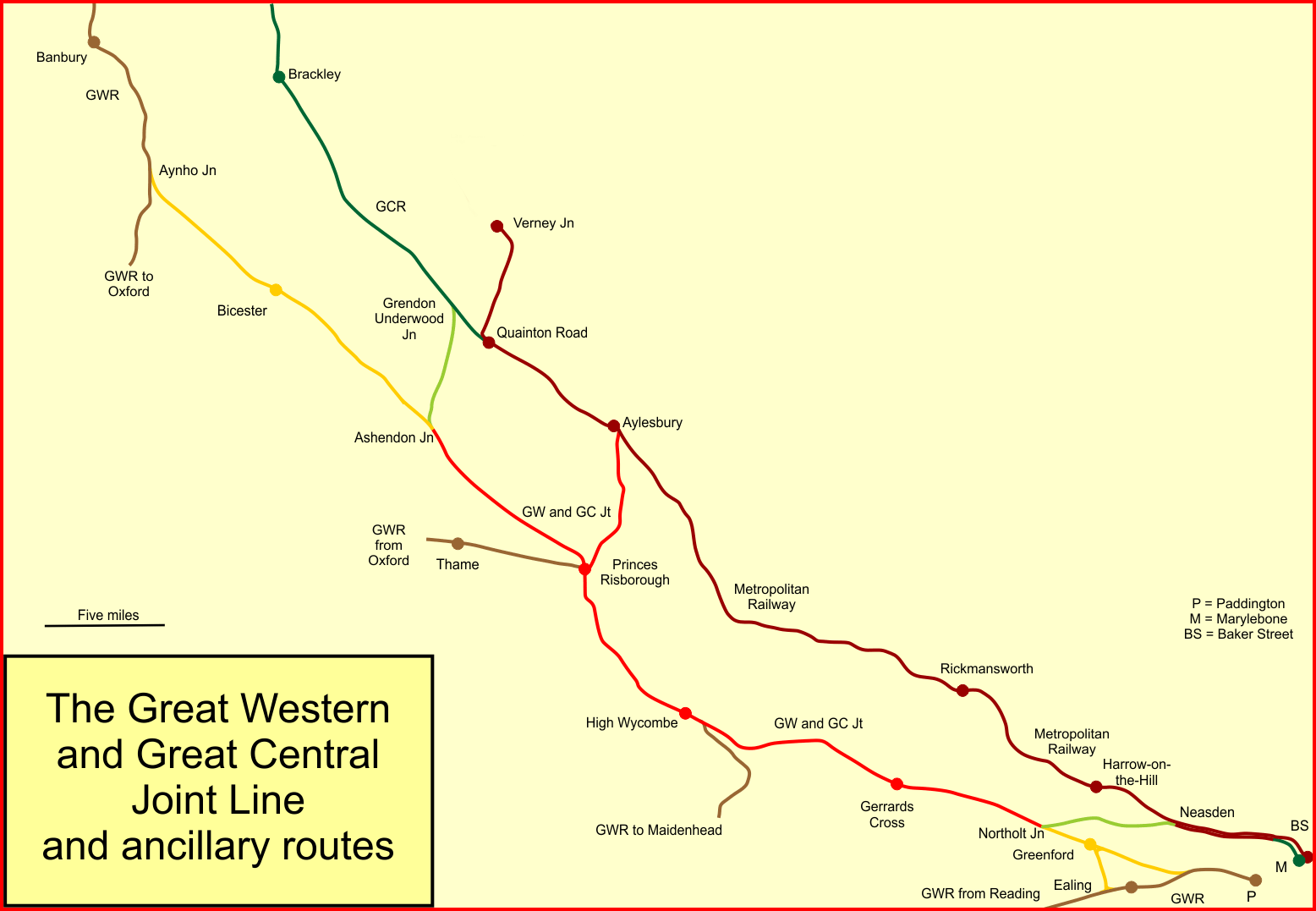
The Great Western and Great Central Joint Railway (red) and the Bicester cut-off line (yellow) opened in 1906 and 1910 respectively. This completed the route of what is now the Chiltern Main Line.

=== GWR era ===
Once the route between Birmingham and London was completed in 1852, the GWR introduced its first expresses between the two cities, timed at 2 hours 45 minutes, however this was soon revised to three hours, which matched the timings of the rival LNWR service. There was relatively little improvement for the rest of the 19th century, and three-hour expresses remained the standard timing of both companies until 1905, when the LNWR introduced new, more powerful Precursor Class locomotives, which allowed them to introduce two-hour expresses. The GWR could not compete with this, and it spurred the shortening of its route, as detailed above, which allowed them to introduce a matching timing of two hours once the works were completed in 1910.

=== Heyday, decline and rationalisation ===
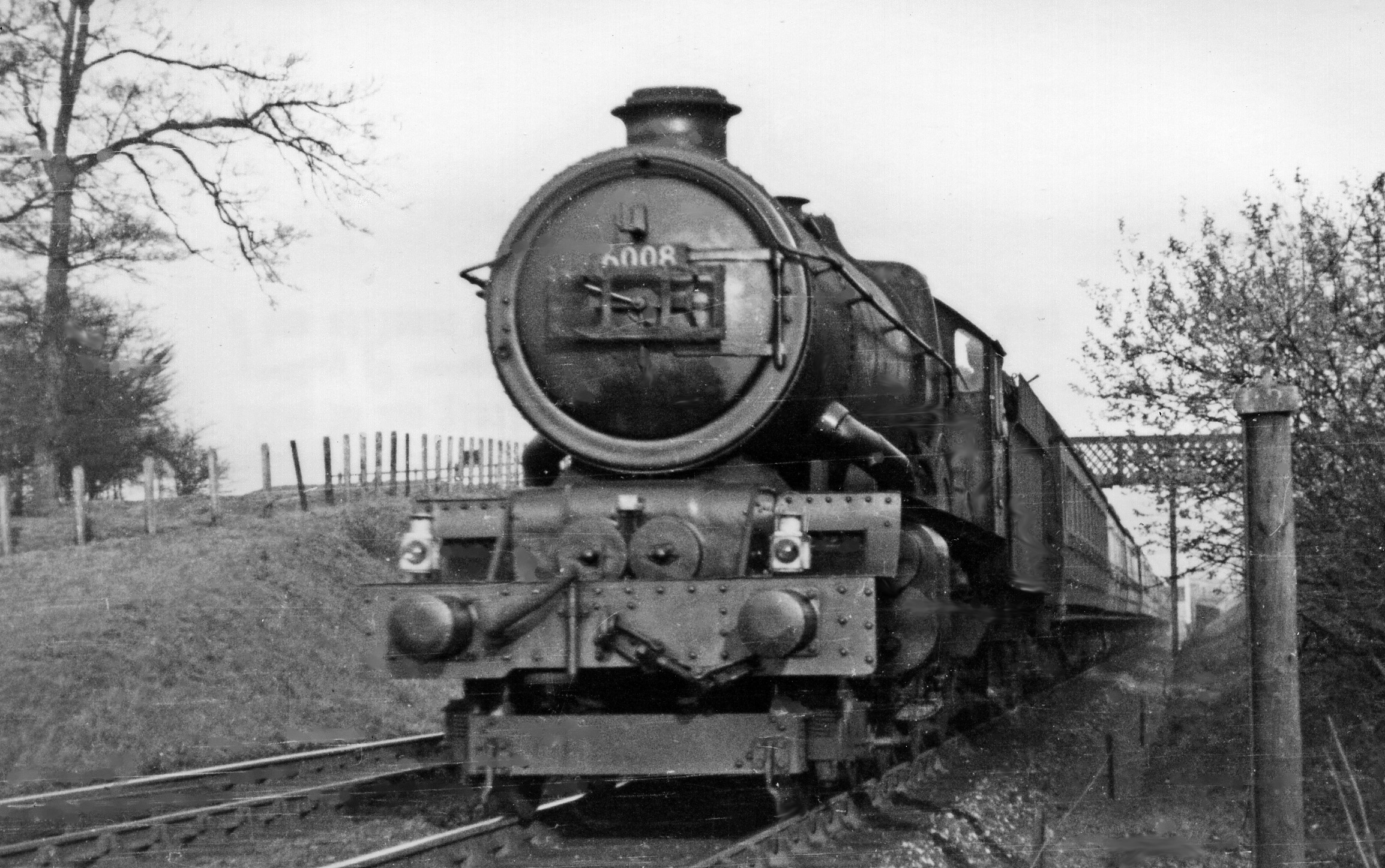
An Ex-GWR King Class locomotive 6008 King James II hauling a Paddington to Birkenhead Woodside express in 1950

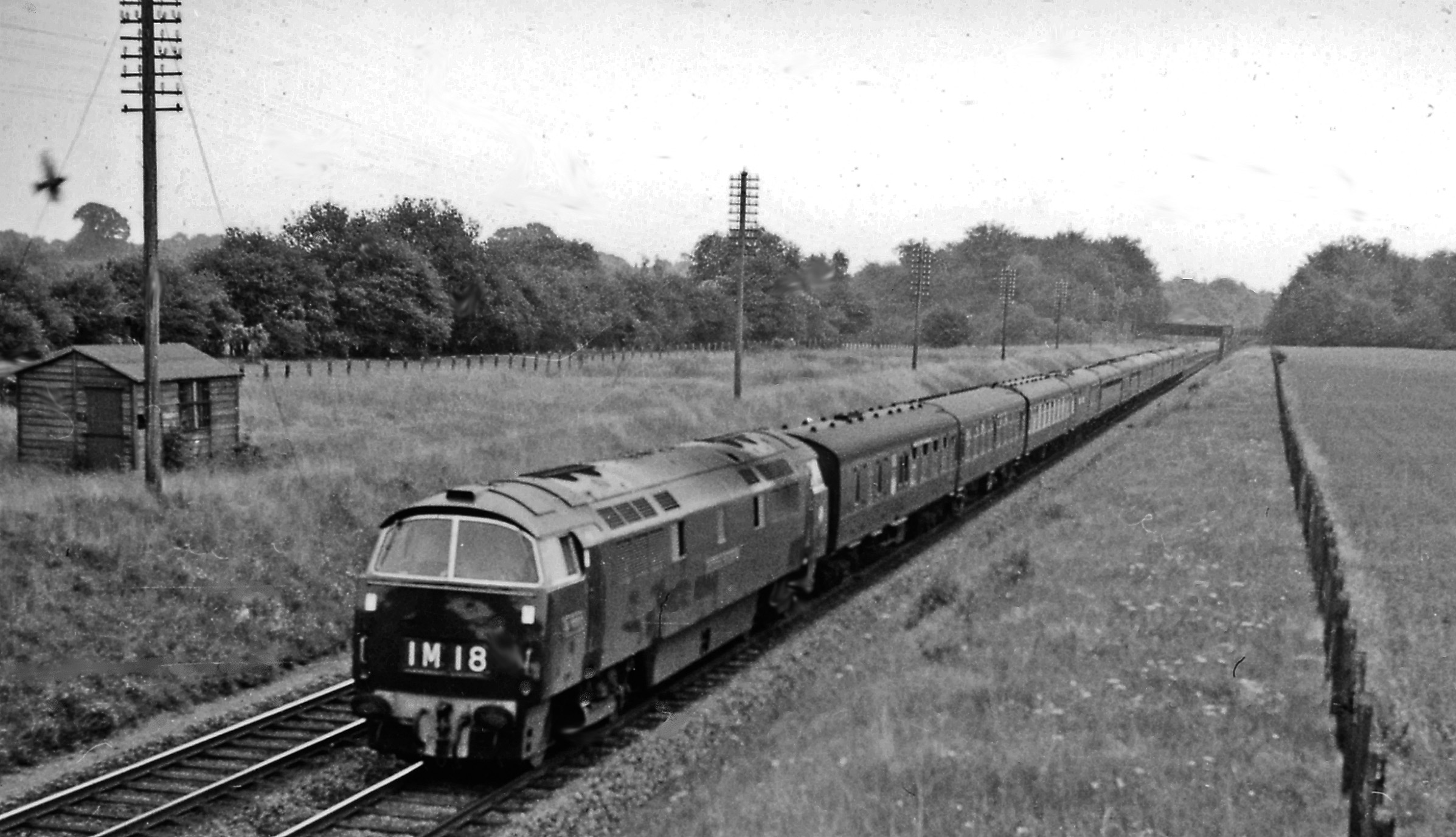
A Class 52 hauling an express from Paddington to Birkenhead Woodside near Seer Green in 1962

During the heyday of the route, many prestigious trains ran from Paddington to the north-west of England, via the Joint Line; these reached Wolverhampton, Shrewsbury, Wrexham General, Chester and Birkenhead Woodside. Various through services from Marylebone to the GCR network also ran via the Joint Line between London and Ashendon Junction.

At nationalisation in 1948, the line passed to the Western Region of British Railways, which continued to operate Paddington-Birmingham-Wolverhampton-Birkenhead fast trains through the 1950s in competition with the London Midland Region's (LMR) from Euston via the West Coast Main Line (WCML).

The Paddington-Birmingham-Wolverhampton-Birkenhead fast service was increased sharply in frequency to up to 15 trains a day each way from the 1959–60 timetable to compensate for the withdrawal of most London Midlands Region trains during electrification of the WCML. For the same reason, the Chiltern line was used by many trains between Paddington and Birkenhead from 1965.

All local trains were diverted to Marylebone in 1963 and operated by four-car Class 115 diesel multiple units (DMUs) and the main-line platforms at Greenford, on the New North route between Old Oak Common and Northolt Junction, were closed.

After the GCR main line was closed between Calvert and Rugby Central in September 1966, some trains from the South Coast were diverted north of Banbury via the route. These became the forerunners of today's CrossCountry services between Birmingham and Bournemouth.

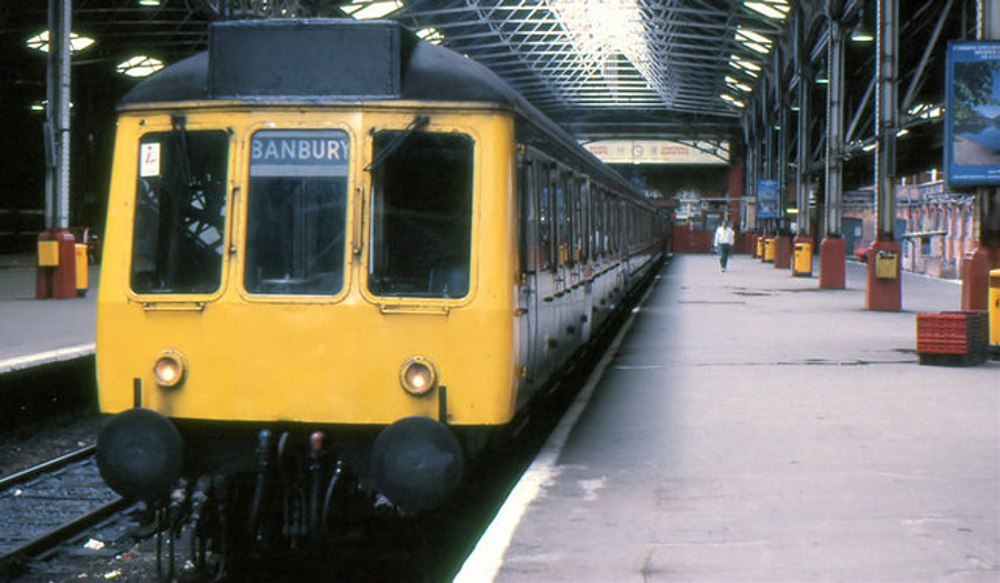
Class 115 DMUs operated Marylebone – Banbury local services between 1960 and 1992

On 6 March 1967, after completion of the WCML electrification, express trains from Paddington to Birmingham/Wolverhampton/Birkenhead were discontinued under The Reshaping of British Railways. The route was downgraded to secondary status, with all but one of the main-line services between London and Birmingham diverted via Oxford. In 1968, the line between Princes Risborough and Aynho Junction was reduced to single track and only a basic two-hourly DMU service between Marylebone and Banbury remained to serve Bicester. Through lines were removed from most of those stations which had them, including Denham in 1965, Beaconsfield in 1973 and Gerrards Cross in 1989; the relief lines were lifted between Lapworth and Tyseley. The tunnel between Birmingham Moor Street and Snow Hill was closed on 2 March 1968. Local services from Leamington and Stratford terminated at Moor Street; the remaining services from Paddington and the South Coast were diverted into New Street. Snow Hill closed completely, along with most of the line to Wolverhampton, on 4 March 1972.

On 24 March 1974, the line from Marylebone to Banbury transferred from the Western Region to the London Midland Region; all stations between South Ruislip and Bicester were also transferred to LMR, giving LMR the responsibility of all passenger services out of Marylebone.

In 1977, the Parliamentary Select Committee on Nationalised Industries recommended considering electrification of more of the rail network and, by 1979, BR presented a range of options to electrify numerous routes by 2000. Some of these options included the Banbury–Birmingham section of the line, plus the Cherwell Valley Line and the Coventry to Leamington line. Under the 1979–90 Conservative governments that succeeded the 1976–79 Labour government, the proposals were not implemented.

The route was considered for partial closure between Marylebone and Northolt Junction in the early 1980s. All services would have run to Paddington, via the New North route; Marylebone station, and all lines leading to it, would have been closed and converted into a bus station. Services to and from Aylesbury would have been taken over by London Underground and run into Baker Street. However, these proposals proved impractical and Marylebone was formally reprieved in 1986 (with a press announcement made on 30 April 1986) and the closure proposals rescinded.

=== Rejuvenation ===
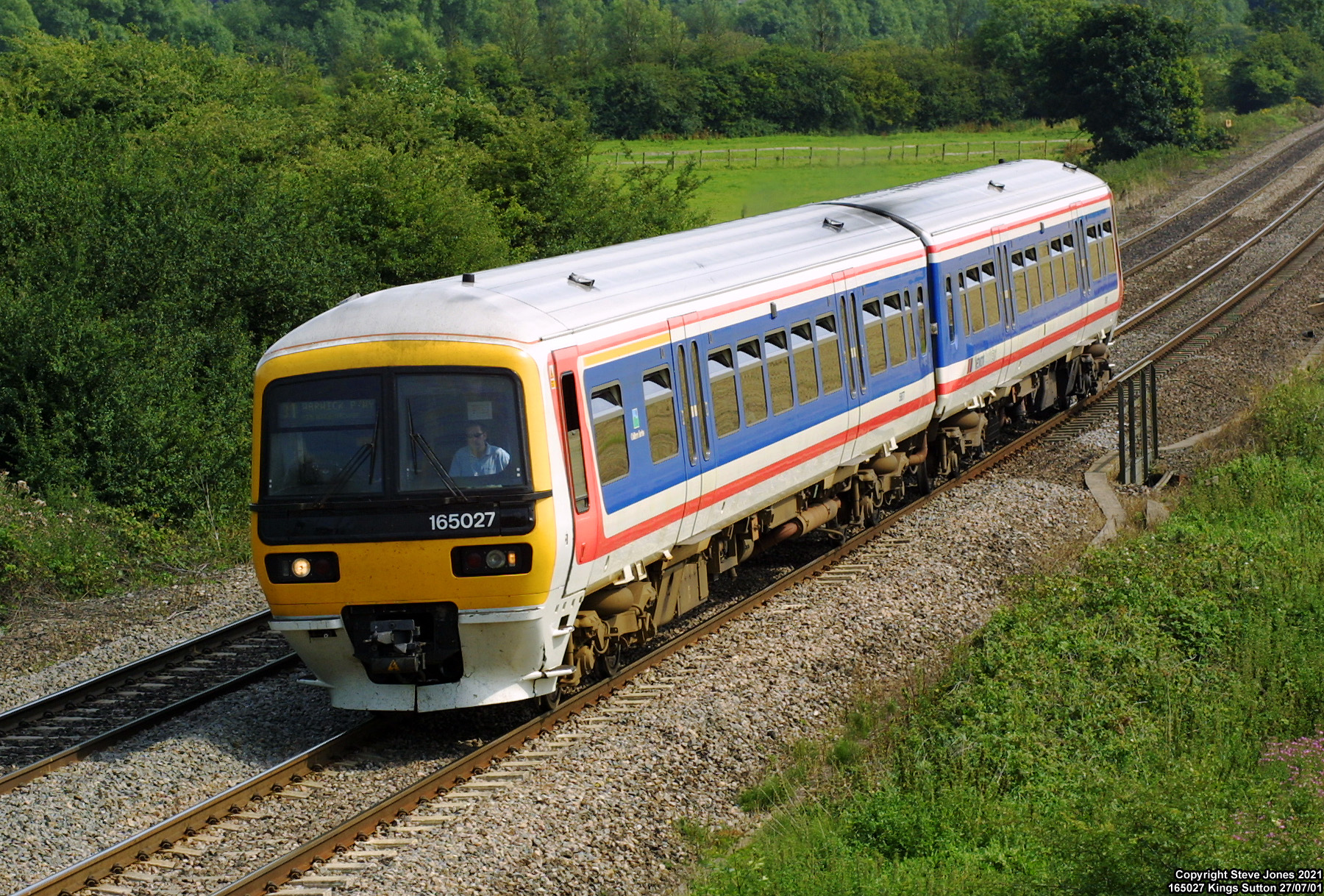
Class 165 DMUs were introduced to the Chiltern Main Line by Network SouthEast

With the sectorisation of British Rail in the mid-1980s, operations south of Banbury fell under the control of Network SouthEast in 1986, under the Thames & Chiltern sub-sector; this was split later into two constituent parts. In 1987, a new station was opened at Haddenham & Thame Parkway. Birmingham Snow Hill reopened in 1987, on a much smaller scale than the original, beneath a multi-storey car park; its tunnel was reinstated and new platforms added to the through lines at Moor Street, where the terminus was taken out of use. Leamington/Stratford services were diverted to Snow Hill.

The opening of the extension of the parallel M40 motorway from Oxford to Birmingham in 1991 spawned development in towns along the northern section of the route, notably Bicester, Banbury, Leamington Spa and Warwick. This generated additional patronage for train services in the corridor.

Between 1988 and 1992, British Rail used the Chiltern Line as a test bed for total route modernisation; this included resignalling from Marylebone to Aynho Junction, and both Marylebone to Aylesbury routes, from the new Marylebone Integrated Control Centre, with full Automatic Train Protection provided. The track was renewed and Marylebone was refurbished. Much of this work was funded by selling part of Marylebone for development, which meant that the station lost two of its platforms; the central cab road at Marylebone was removed and two replacement platforms inserted in its place.

New Class 165 Networker Turbo trains were introduced in 1991, replacing the ageing 1960s diesels. These improved passenger comfort and enabled journey times to be reduced; frequencies were increased, with an hourly stopping service to/from High Wycombe and hourly semi-fast service to/from Banbury. In 1993, Marylebone-Banbury services were extended to Snow Hill, calling at Leamington Spa, Warwick, Solihull and Moor Street, initially on a two-hourly frequency; these were increased to hourly in the following year. In 1995, the Jewellery Line was reopened, to allow Worcester line services to be diverted from New Street to Snow Hill; this resulted in some of Chiltern's weekday peak-period services to be extended beyond Snow Hill, first to Stourbridge Junction and then to Kidderminster.

=== Chiltern Railways era ===
Upon railway privatisation in 1996, the franchise to operate the network was won by M40 Trains, a consortium of a management buyout, Laing Rail (a subsidiary of construction company and PFI specialist John Laing plc) and venture capitalist 3i. In 1998, the line between Princes Risborough and Bicester North was redoubled by the company; this included the total reconstruction of Haddenham and Thame Parkway at platform level, with two side platforms instead of the single platform constructed in 1987, and a new down platform at Princes Risborough, together with the raising of the speed limit. Also in 1998, the first Class 168 Clubman trains, with a maximum speed of 100 miles per hour (160 km/h), were introduced to reduce journey times.

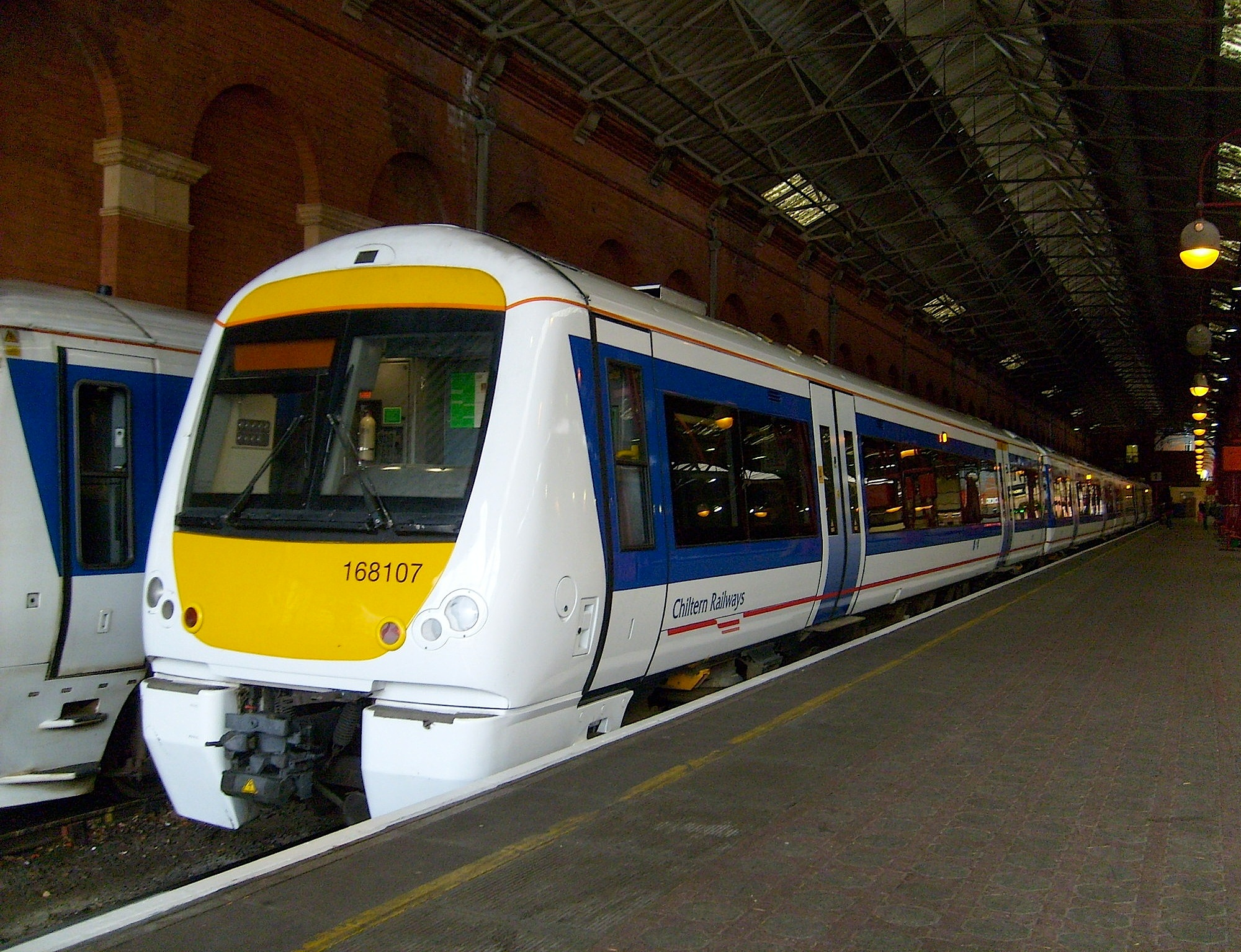
Chiltern Railways ordered 19 Class 168 DMUs for its Marylebone–Birmingham services

In 2000, Chiltern Railways Ltd. (successor to M40 Trains) opened a new station at Warwick Parkway, to the west of the town next to the A46 and close to M40 Junction 15. This was intended to be a railhead for nearby towns without a station, such as Kenilworth, and for towns south of Birmingham close to the M42 with no direct rail link to London, such as Redditch and Bromsgrove. Construction was funded by the company, with some support from Warwickshire County Council. At first, only Chiltern services called there but it is now also served by West Midlands Railway.

In 2002, after Chiltern won its 20-year franchise, the line between Bicester North and Aynho Junction was also redoubled. Chiltern took over Hatton to Stratford-upon-Avon services from Thames Trains and Central Trains, with direct services between Marylebone (rather than Paddington) and Stratford. Also at this time, Chiltern took over the operation of Leamington Spa, Warwick, Hatton and Lapworth stations from Central Trains, as the latter's services (now operated by London Midland) no longer operated beyond Dorridge except during weekday peak periods.

John Laing plc acquired 84% ownership of M40 Trains in 1999, buying out 3i; it was itself bought out by Henderson Investments in 2006, resulting in the sale of Laing Rail to the German national railway operator Deutsche Bahn in 2007.

The Cherwell Valley line between Banbury and Leamington Spa was resignalled during 2004, with the closure of Fenny Compton signal box and the removal of its remaining semaphore signals. The new signalling and the existing signalling in the Leamington Spa station area is controlled from the box at Leamington via a new Westcad workstation. More recently, the Leamington to Birmingham section has been resignalled and is controlled from the new West Midlands ICC at Saltley (taking over the old signalling centre at Saltley), with new 4-aspect LED signals throughout. But the manual signal boxes at Banbury North and South remained, along with some GWR lower-quadrant signals controlling the bay platforms and sidings at the station. In 2016, the station was remodelled and resignalled, being incorporated into the West Midlands ICC take over control as Oxford (exclusive) in 2016.

Most of the route from Birmingham Snow Hill to Wolverhampton is now used by the West Midlands Metro light-rail system, which diverges from Network Rail's Jewellery Line at The Hawthorns.

The route between Marylebone and Leamington/Bordesley was used by open access operator Wrexham & Shropshire's services from London to Wrexham, via Tame Bridge, Wolverhampton and Shrewsbury; this consisted of three Mark 3 coaches, powered by Class 67 diesel locomotives. Since these were neither Sprinters nor High Speed Trains, they were restricted to lower line speeds, e.g. 60 miles per hour (97 km/h) between Princes Risborough and Bicester, and 70 miles per hour (110 km/h) between Leamington and Bordesley; they were permitted to travel at 85 miles per hour (137 km/h) between Bicester and Aynho. Wrexham & Shropshire had negotiated with Network Rail to allow its trains to travel at higher speeds on these sections, which required it to show that they had sufficient brake force to stop from such speeds within the signal spacings.

Only the little-used line from Northolt Junction to Paddington has not been improved.

In September 2006, Chiltern completed its Evergreen 2 upgrade project, carried out by Carillion, which realigned the track through Beaconsfield to increase non-stop speeds from 40 to 75 miles per hour (64 to 121 km/h), installed additional signals between High Wycombe and Bicester North and between Princes Risborough and Aylesbury, and added two platforms (Nos 5 and 6) at Marylebone, on the site of the daytime carriage sidings, replaced by the new Wembley Light Maintenance Depot, just south and west of Wembley Stadium station. The new platforms and partial resignalling of the station throat made it possible to run 20 trains per hour in and out of the station.

At weekends during 2008, when major engineering works were taking place on the WCML, the line was used by Virgin Trains' London Euston – Birmingham International Blockade Buster service via Willesden, Acton Main Line, Ealing Broadway, Greenford, High Wycombe, Banbury and Coventry, using pairs of five-car Class 221 Super Voyager sets.

== Infrastructure ==
=== Tunnels and viaducts ===
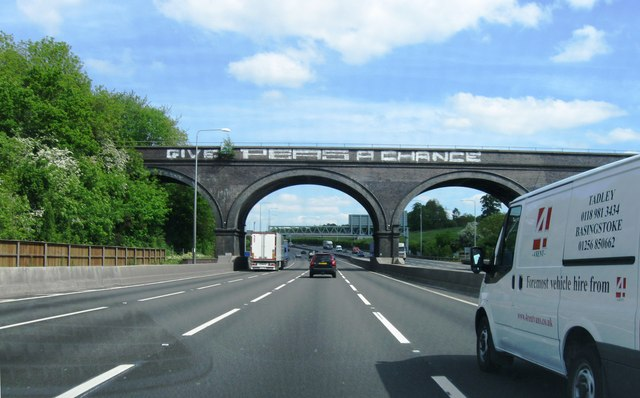
The "Give Peas a Chance" viaduct is a landmark on the M25

There are several major civil engineering structures along the route of the Chiltern Main Line.

The viaduct (Chalfonts No. 1 (Misbourne) Viaduct) crossing the M25 between Denham Golf Club and Gerrard's Cross is especially noted as a local landmark, as for many years it has borne a graffiti slogan, "give peas a chance" painted in large white letters on the south-facing parapet. The graffiti was partially removed in 2018.

Tunnels and viaducts on the Chiltern Main Line
Railway Structure	Length	ELR	Location
Snow Hill Tunnel	635 yards (581 m)	DCL	South of Snow Hill station
Bordesley Viaduct	38 chains (760 m)	DCL	South of Moor Street station
Goods Yard Approach & Corporation Yard Viaducts	18 chains (360 m)	DCL	Bordesley station
River Avon Viaduct	3 chains (60 m)	DCL	Between Warwick and Leamington Spa stations
Leamington Viaducts / Neilson Street Viaduct	18 chains (360 m)	DCL	East of Leamington Spa station
Harbury Tunnel	70 yards (64 m)	DCL	Between Leamington Spa and Banbury stations
Aynho Flyover (Down line)		NAJ3	Between Kings Sutton and Bicester North stations
Souldern No. 2 Viaduct	400 yards (366 m)	NAJ3	Between Aynho junction and Bicester North station
Souldern No. 1 Viaduct	580 yards (530 m)	NAJ3	Between Aynho junction and Bicester North station
Ardley Tunnel	1,155 yards (1,056 m)	NAJ3	Between Aynho junction and Bicester North station
Brill Tunnel	191 yards (175 m)	NAJ3	Between Bicester North and Haddenham and Thame Parkway stations
River Thame Viaduct	4 chains (80 m)	NAJ2	North of Haddenham and Thame Parkway station
Saunderton Tunnel (Up line)	83 yards (76 m)	NAJ2	South of Princes Risborough station
Hughenden Road Viaduct	77 yards (70 m)	NAJ2	North of High Wycombe station
Gordon Road Viaduct	47 yards (43 m)	NAJ2	Between High Wycombe and Beaconsfield stations
Sir Philip Rose's Viaduct	66 yards (60 m)	NAJ2	Between High Wycombe and Beaconsfield stations
Whitehouse Tunnel	352 yards (322 m)	NAJ2	Between High Wycombe and Beaconsfield stations
'Tesco' Covered Way (also known as Gerrards Cross Tunnel)	350 yards (320 m)	NAJ2	South of Gerrards Cross station
Chalfonts No. 2 Viaduct	165 yards (151 m)	NAJ2	Between Gerrards Cross and Denham Golf Club stations
Chalfonts No. 1 (Misbourne) Viaduct (also M25 under)	114 yards (104 m)	NAJ2	Between Gerrards Cross and Denham Golf Club stations
River Colne Viaduct	121 yards (111 m)	NAJ2	South of Denham station
Grand Union Canal Viaduct	198 yards (181 m)	NAJ2	South of Denham station
South Harrow Tunnel	204 yards (187 m)	NAJ1	West of Sudbury Hill Harrow station
Kilburn Viaduct	23 chains (460 m)	MCJ1	North of Marylebone station
Hampstead Tunnel	694 yards (635 m)	MCJ1	North of Marylebone station
St John's Wood Tunnel	1,606 yards (1,469 m)	MCJ1	North of Marylebone station

=== Oxford Connection ===
A quarter of a mile (about 0.3 km) of double track has been constructed joining the Oxford to Bicester Line at Bicester Village to the Chiltern line, allowing a new Oxford to London Marylebone service to operate, calling at Bicester Village and High Wycombe. The track between Wolvercote Tunnel (on the outskirts of Oxford) and Bicester Village has been rebuilt and a new station constructed at Water Eaton, named Oxford Parkway. The scheme includes additional platforms at Bicester, Islip and Oxford. The Oxford line was reopened in stages during 2015 and 2016; services from London Marylebone to Oxford Parkway began in October 2015. Services through to Oxford started on 11 December 2016. The delay to the full service was due to works in the Wolvercote tunnel, which were specifically scheduled to minimise disruption to roosting bats. The upgraded track has two bi-directional tracks and headroom in the tunnel for overhead electrification to be installed at a later date.

== Main Line upgrade ==
The second part of the project upgraded the line to 100 miles per hour (160 km/h) running on 50 miles (80 km) more of track, with junctions at Neasden, Northolt and Aynho rebuilt to permit higher speeds. The up through track was restored at Princes Risborough and signalled for bidirectional use, the existing 'up' line becoming a bidirectional platform loop. A new turnback siding was provided at Gerrards Cross and a new 'down' through track built from Northolt Junction to Ruislip Gardens, running alongside the up line to the east of the waste transfer station; the down line will continue to serve South Ruislip. Speed restrictions through Bicester North were raised to permit 100-mile-per-hour (160 km/h) running, with a new up alignment and platform. Two of the original terminal platforms at Birmingham Moor Street were reopened for Chiltern services in December 2010. Accelerated services started in September 2011, after being postponed due to concerns about whether the works would be completed in time.

Thanks to the speed increases, journey times have been reduced significantly. From Marylebone, the fastest journey time to Birmingham Moor Street is now 94 minutes instead of 117 minutes. The table below outlines the originally proposed peak timetable improvements as indicated by Network Rail. This compares to roughly 85 minutes for the fastest Euston-Birmingham New Street trains, via the West Coast Main Line.

Chiltern Railways chairman Adrian Shooter said, "This is the biggest passenger rail project for several generations not to call on the taxpayer for support. Working closely with Network Rail, we are going to create a new main line railway for the people of Oxfordshire and the Midlands. This deal demonstrates that real improvements to rail services can be paid for without public subsidy by attracting people out of their cars and on to trains."

Network Rail said its investment will be reimbursed by a 'facility charge' over the next 30 years, by Chiltern Railways, whose franchise expires in December 2021, and then by the future franchisee. The infrastructure upgrade was carried out by main contractor BAM Nuttall, in partnership with Jarvis and WS Atkins.

Fastest Peak Time from London (mins)
	Previous	Evergreen 3
Gerrards Cross	21	18
High Wycombe	34	23
Princes Risborough	41	32
Bicester	56	44
Banbury	67	50
Leamington Spa	85	67
Solihull	107	84
Birmingham Moor Street	117	92

== Passenger services ==
While Chiltern Railways is the main operator of the route, parts of the line carry services by other operators:

- West Midlands Trains operates local services in the West Midlands area between Birmingham, Dorridge and Leamington Spa, as part of the Snow Hill Lines
- CrossCountry operates some services from either Birmingham (joining the line at Bordesley junction) or Leamington (joining from the Coventry-Leamington line) and running as far as Aynho Junction where they diverge towards Oxford
- Great Western Railway also operates a route between Didcot Parkway to Banbury

=== Weekday off-peak service pattern ===
At December 2025:

Service	Type	Trains per hour	Notes
Chiltern Railways, over the whole line
London Marylebone – Birmingham Moor Street	Fast	2	1 TPH usually is extended to Birmingham Snow Hill. One morning and one evening service extended to Stourbridge Junction.
London Marylebone – Banbury	Semi fast	1	
London Marylebone – Bicester North	Semi-fast	1	
London Marylebone – Princes Risborough	Semi-fast	1	
London Marylebone – High Wycombe	local	1	
London Marylebone – Gerrards Cross	local	1	
Leamington Spa – Birmingham Moor Street	local	2	
West Midlands Trains, between Birmingham Moor Street and Leamington Spa
Service	Type	Trains Per Hour	Stations on Chiltern Main Line called at
Stratford-upon-Avon – Worcester Foregate Street via Dorridge	local	1	Lapworth, Dorridge, Widney Manor, Solihull, Olton, Acocks Green, Small Heath, Birmingham Moor Street
Stratford-upon-Avon – Kidderminster via Whitlocks End	local	1	Tyseley, Small Heath, Birmingham Moor Street
Whitlocks End – Kidderminster	local	1	Tyseley, Small Heath, Birmingham Moor Street
Dorridge – Worcester Foregate Street	local	1	Dorridge, Widney Manor, Solihull, Olton, Acocks Green, Tyseley, Birmingham Moor Street
Leamington Spa – Nuneaton	local	1	Leamington Spa
Cross Country, between Birmingham Moor Street and Leamington Spa
Bournemouth – Manchester Piccadilly	Inter-city	1	Banbury, Leamington Spa
Reading – Newcastle	Inter-city	4 tpd	Banbury, Leamington Spa
Birmingham New Street - Nottingham	Inter-city	1 southbound tpd	Banbury, Leamington Spa
GWR, between Banbury and Aynho Junction
Didcot Parkway to Banbury	local	1tp2h	Banbury

=== Rolling stock ===
Passenger trains are operated by:

Chiltern Railways
Class	Image	Type	Top speed		Cars per set	Built
Class	Image	Type	mph	km/h	Cars per set	Built
Class 165/0; Network Turbo		Diesel multiple unit	75	120	2 or 3	1990–1992
Class 168/0 Clubman		Diesel multiple unit	100	160	4	1998
Class 168/1 Turbostar Clubman		Diesel multiple unit	100	160	3 or 4	2000
Class 168/2 Turbostar Clubman		Diesel multiple unit	100	160	3 or 4	2004
Class 168/3 Turbostar Clubman		Diesel multiple unit	100	160	3 or 4	2000
Class 68		Diesel Locomotive	100	160	N/A	2013–2014
Mark 5A Coach		Passenger Coach	125	200	N/A	2017-2018
Mark 5A Coach		Driving Trailer	125	200	N/A	2017-2018
West Midlands Trains
Class	Image	Type	Top speed		Cars per set	Built
Class	Image	Type	mph	km/h	Cars per set	Built
Class 172/2 Turbostar		Diesel multiple unit	100	161	2	2011
Class 172/3 Turbostar		Diesel multiple unit	100	161	3	2011
Class 196/0 Civity		Diesel multiple unit	100	161	2	2019-2022
Class 196/1 Civity		Diesel multiple unit	100	161	4	2019-2022
CrossCountry
Class	Image	Type	Top speed		Cars per set	Built
Class	Image	Type	mph	km/h	Cars per set	Built
Class 220 Voyager		Diesel-electric multiple unit	125	200	4	2001
Class 221 Super Voyager		Diesel-electric multiple unit	125	200	4 or 5	2001
Great Western Railway
Class	Image	Type	Top speed		Cars per set	Built
Class	Image	Type	mph	km/h	Cars per set	Built
Class 165/1 Network Turbo		Diesel multiple unit	90	145	2 or 3	1992

=== Former rolling stock ===
Chiltern Railways
Class	Image	Type	Top Speed		Cars per set	Built	Year Withdrawn
Class	Image	Type	mph	km/h	Cars per set	Built	Year Withdrawn
Class 172/1 Turbostar		Diesel multiple unit	100	160	2	2011	2021
Mark 3 Coach		Passenger Coach	125	200	N/A	1975–1984	2026
Mark 3 Coach		Driving Van Trailer	125	200	N/A	1988	2026
Class	Image	Type	Top speed		Cars per set	Built	Year Withdrawn
Class	Image	Type	mph	km/h	Cars per set	Built	Year Withdrawn
Class 153 Super Sprinter		Diesel multiple unit	75	121	1	1987–1988	2020
Class 170/5 Turbostar		Diesel multiple unit	100	161	2	1999–2000	2021-2023
Class 170/6 Turbostar		Diesel multiple unit	100	161	3	1999–2000	2021-2023

=== Connections ===
These are available at:

- Birmingham Snow Hill, to Kidderminster and Worcester, and Midland Metro to West Bromwich and Wolverhampton.
- Birmingham Moor Street, to Stratford-upon-Avon
- Leamington Spa, to Stratford-upon-Avon, Coventry, Birmingham International, and The North
- Banbury, to Oxford, Reading, and Southampton Central
- Princes Risborough, to Aylesbury
- West Ruislip/South Ruislip, to the LU Central line to Oxford Circus
- London Marylebone, to Aylesbury and the LU Bakerloo line to Oxford Circus

Birmingham New Street, the city's main station, is a five-minute walk from Moor Street; Baker Street, where several London Underground lines call, is a five-minute walk from London Marylebone.

== Future ==
=== Battery/diesel trains ===
In September 2021, Class 168/3 HybridFlex battery/diesel trains were introduced, with lower emissions. The trains operate on batteries, giving zero emissions when in stations or sensitive urban areas. However, the trains were removed from service in September 2023 as the diesel engine emitted high pollutants in stations.

=== Electrification ===
No section of the line is electrified but, in 2010, the then chairman of Chiltern Railways, Adrian Shooter, indicated that electrification was being considered, though not in the immediate future. He added: "We could do some very interesting things with high-acceleration electric multiple units and possibly some further infrastructure work."

=== Other plans ===
There are several proposals:

- The restoration of the quadruple track between South Ruislip and West Ruislip, allowing trains to call at both stations without blocking the line. Triple track currently exists at West Ruislip, with the up platform loop still in situ, and at South Ruislip, with the Down Main through line in situ. This would involve the reconstruction of the down platform at West Ruislip, the reconstruction of the up platform at South Ruislip and the demolition of West Ruislip signal box.
- Building of a new combined West Hampstead Interchange, bringing together what are currently three close by, but physically separated stations to allow easy interchange with the London Overground (Mildmay Line), London Underground (Jubilee line) and Thameslink (Thameslink line) and Chiltern Railways, with new Metropolitan line platforms possible.
