= High Wycombe railway station =

Railway station in Buckinghamshire, England

Coordinates: 51.630°N 0.745°W

High Wycombe
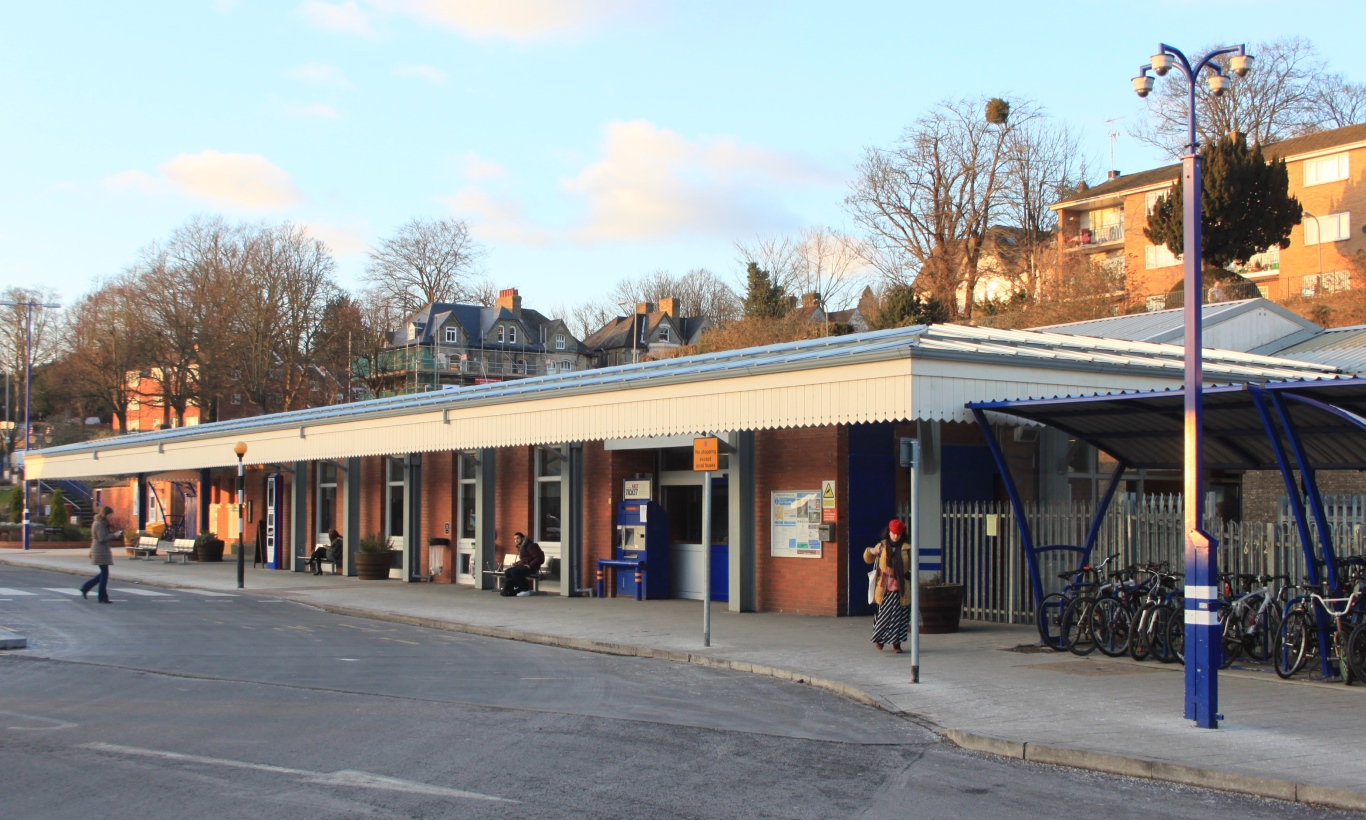
- High Wycombe station forecourt in February 2015

General information
- Location: High Wycombe, Buckinghamshire; England
- Grid reference: SU869930
- Manager: Chiltern Railways
- Platforms: 3

Other information
- Station code: HWY
- Classification: DfT category C1

History
- Original company: Wycombe Railway
- Pre-grouping: GW&GCJR
- Post-grouping: GW&GCJR

Key dates
- 1 August 1854: Terminus station opened
- 1 October 1864: Through station opened. Original terminus becomes a goods shed
- 2 April 1906: Through services along GW&GCJR begun
- 2 May 1970: Services to Bourne End withdrawn

Passengers
- 2020/21: ▼0.543 million
- Interchange: ▼13,716
- 2021/22: ▲1.624 million
- Interchange: ▲59,927
- 2022/23: ▲1.917 million
- Interchange: ▲91,589
- 2023/24: ▲1.971 million
- Interchange: ▼69,677
- 2024/25: ▲2.161 million
- Interchange: ▲75,476
Location
Notes
- Passenger statistics from the Office of Rail and Road

High Wycombe railway station is a railway station in the market town of High Wycombe in Buckinghamshire, England. The station is on the Chiltern Main Line between Beaconsfield and Saunderton stations. It is served by Chiltern Railways.

== History ==
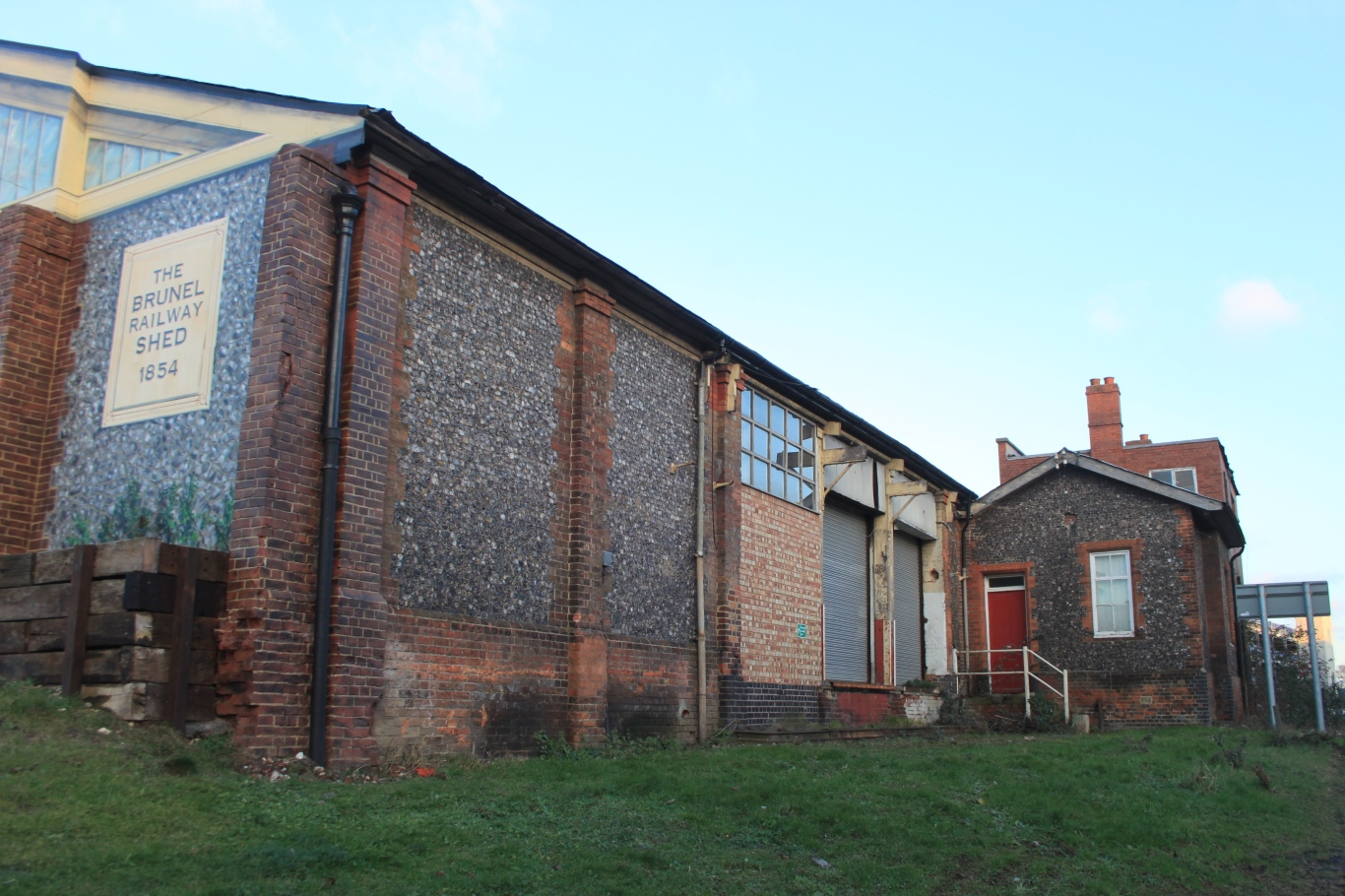
The remains of the 1854 station, photo taken in February 2015

The original terminus station was built in 1854 after an original design by Isambard Kingdom Brunel.

The station had one platform and a train shed that covered two broad gauge tracks. On one side of the train shed was a single road engine shed and on the platform side were a booking office and waiting rooms (on the Birdcage Walk side). The walls of the train shed, an engine shed and offices were constructed from brick and knapped flint with slate roofs. This building remained as a station in use until 1864 when it became a goods shed. Between the 1880s and 1940 various additions were made to the fabric of the old station. The building was Grade II listed in 1999 due to being one of only six remaining GWR train sheds. Following listing most of the later additions were removed, restoring the building to its original footprint, the only addition being the flat roof second floor extension added in 1940.

The dimensions and general design of the train shed, engine shed and office accommodation were repeated at Thame with only the building materials different; Wycombe was built with brick and knapped flint wall while Thame was constructed from timber.

A second through station was opened on the current location in 1864 with a second platform and, later, a footbridge. For two years prior to this date, after the extension to Thame had been made, all through trains had to reverse in and out of the old station which was not located on the new through lines. The design of the office accommodation on the newer station was a copy of the office accommodation on the old, with a canopy covering the platform rather than the train shed. The building was extended as least once at its west end.

With the building of the Great Western and Great Central Joint Railway in 1906 the station was again rebuilt to the design that is in use today, with four lines between two staggered platforms and a subway.

The station was originally the terminus of the Wycombe Railway line from Maidenhead, which was later extended to Aylesbury and Oxford, and then in 1867 was taken over by the Great Western Railway.

In 1906 the Great Western and Great Central Joint Railway line was opened through High Wycombe, linking London with the two companies' lines to the north. Much of the current Chiltern Main Line is formed from this joint line.

British Rail closed the original branch line to Maidenhead on 2 May 1970 and subsequently the track was lifted.

The station was transferred from the Western Region of British Rail to the London Midland Region on 24 March 1974.

In November 2005 a fire in the ticket office gutted the roof of the building. The restored station building reopened in September 2007.

In April 2015 the Northbound platform was lengthened. The subway was closed and has now been replaced with a footbridge with a lift at each end.

== Services ==
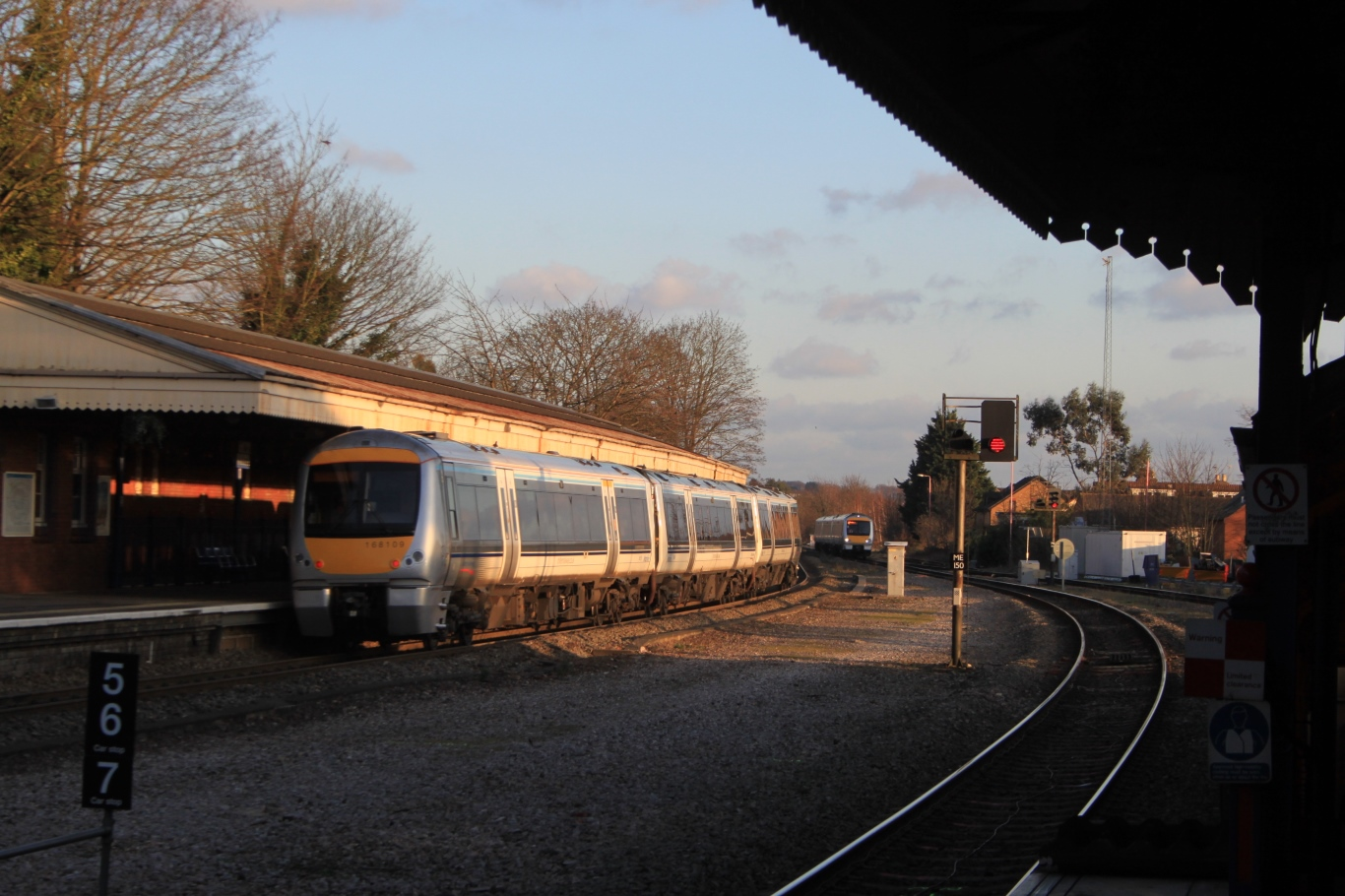
A Class 168 going to London calls at High Wycombe as a Class 168 sister unit on northbound service from London approaches, photo taken in February 2015

All trains are operated by Chiltern Railways. The current off-peak services are:

- 5 trains per hour to London Marylebone, of which:
  - 2 are non-stop to London Marylebone
  - 2 semi-fast, calling at Beaconsfield, Gerrards Cross and sometimes one other station.
  - 1 stopping service, calling at most intermediate stations, which originates from High Wycombe.
- 1 train per hour to Birmingham Moor Street
- 1 train per hour to Banbury, with 1 train per 2 hours extending to Birmingham Snow Hill
- 2 trains per hour to Oxford

Direct services to Aylesbury (1 train per hour) operate late weekday evenings and all day at weekends. At other times it is necessary to change at Princes Risborough.

=== Future ===
High Wycombe is to gain further rail links north of Aylesbury to Winslow and Milton Keynes by 2030 as part of the East West Rail project.

Preceding station	National Rail	Following station
London Marylebone	Chiltern Railways Chiltern Main Line; London Marylebone – Birmingham Snow Hill	Bicester North
London Marylebone	Chiltern Railways Chiltern Main Line; London Marylebone – Birmingham Snow Hill	Haddenham & Thame Parkway
London Marylebone	Chiltern Railways Chiltern Main Line; London Marylebone – Birmingham Snow Hill	Princes Risborough
Beaconsfield	Chiltern Railways London Marylebone – Oxford	Princes Risborough
Beaconsfield	Chiltern Railways London Marylebone – Oxford	Saunderton
Beaconsfield	Chiltern Railways High Wycombe - London Marylebone (Stopping service)	Terminus
	Disused railways	
Terminus	Great Western Railway; Wycombe Railway	Loudwater
