= Harrow tube station =

Harrow tube station could refer to one of a number of London Underground stations serving the Harrow area of north London:

- Harrow-on-the-Hill
- North Harrow
- South Harrow
- West Harrow
- Harrow & Wealdstone

National Rail station Sudbury Hill Harrow is a short walk from Sudbury Hill but is a separate station.
