= Sudbury & Harrow Road railway station =

British railway station

Sudbury & Harrow Road
- Interactive map of Sudbury & Harrow Road

General information
- Location: Sudbury
- Local authority: London Borough of Brent
- Managed by: Chiltern Railways
- Owner: Network Rail
- Station code: SUD
- DfT category: F1
- Number of platforms: 2
- Fare zone: 4

National Rail annual entry and exit
- 2021–22: ▲15,352
- 2022–23: ▲19,778
- 2023–24: ▼18,680
- 2024–25: ▲22,952
- 2025–26: ▲25,808

Key dates
- 1 March 1906: Opened

Other information
- External links: Departures; Facilities
- Coordinates: 51.554°N 0.3167°W

Sudbury & Harrow Road is a National Rail station served by Chiltern Railways in Harrow Road, Sudbury in Greater London. It was the least used railway station in Greater London in 2023/24 and is 400 m (1,300 ft) north of Sudbury Town Underground station.

== History ==
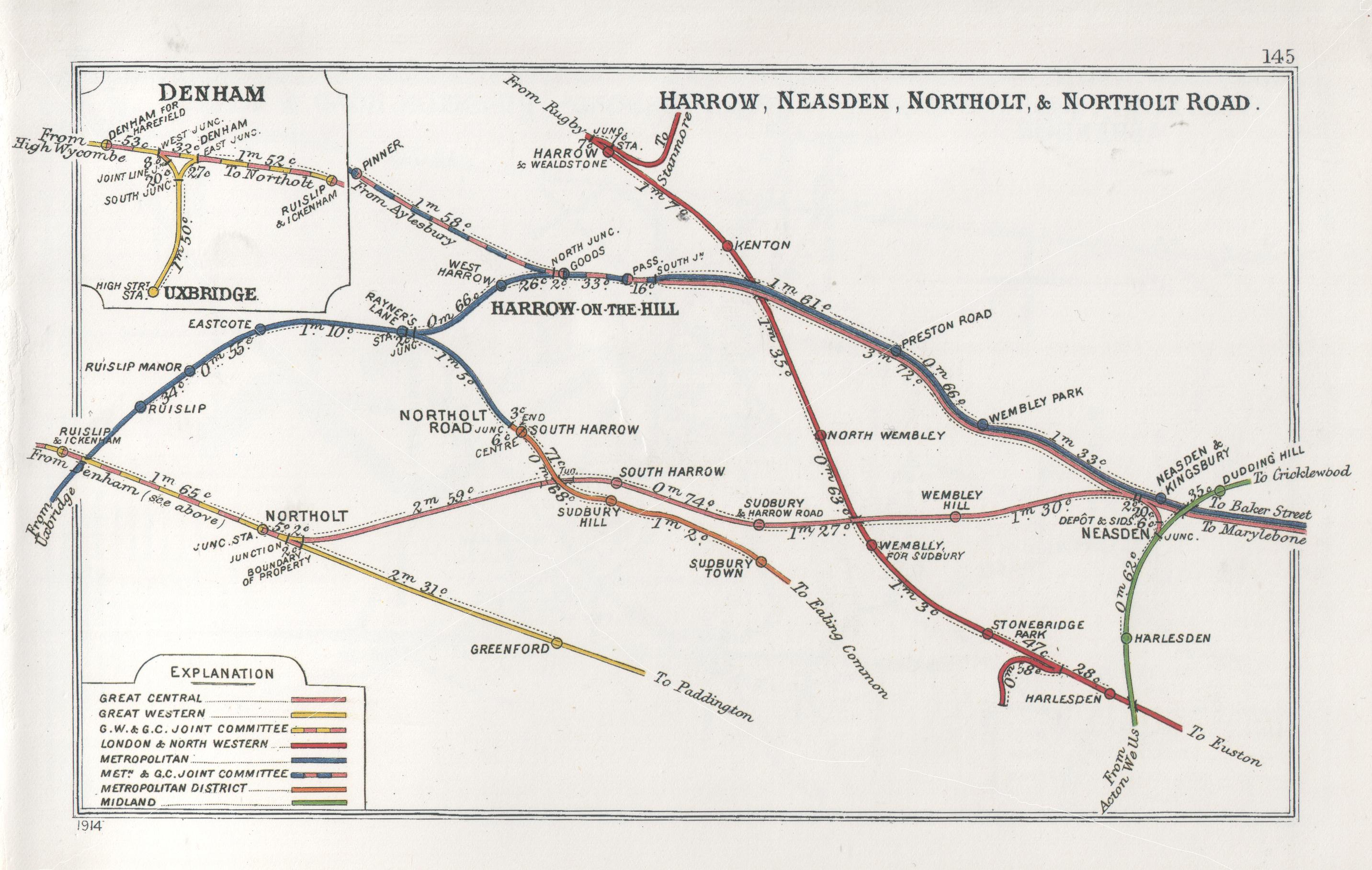
A 1914 Railway Clearing House map of railways in the vicinity of Sudbury & Harrow Road

On 20 November 1905 the Great Central Railway opened a new route for freight trains between Neasden Junction and Northolt Junction. Passenger services from Marylebone began on 1 March 1906, when three new stations were opened: Wembley Hill, Sudbury & Harrow Road and South Harrow. On 2 April 1906 these services were extended to Northolt Junction.

The film 'Mosque in the Park' made for Thames Television and first shown 5 June 1973 featured the daily routine of leading railwayman Mr. Siddiq who was originally from Delhi and who moved to London in 1960. The film shows him at work for British Rail at the Sudbury & Harrow Road railway station, a job that he did alone.

== Services ==
All services at Sudbury & Harrow Road are operated by Chiltern Railways.

The station is served by a limited service of four trains per day in each direction between London Marylebone, West Ruislip and Gerrards Cross during peak hours only. Trains run southbound into London Marylebone in the morning peak and northbound out of London Marylebone in the evening peak.

No services call at the station on weekends or Bank/Public Holidays.

Preceding station	National Rail	Following station
Sudbury Hill Harrow	Chiltern Railways Chiltern Main Line Limited Service	Wembley Stadium

== Connections ==
- London Buses routes 18, 92, 182 and 245 and night routes N18 and N118 serve the station.
- Sudbury Town Underground station is a 5-minute walk away for London Underground services.
