= Sudbury Hill Harrow railway station =

National Rail station in London, England

Sudbury Hill Harrow
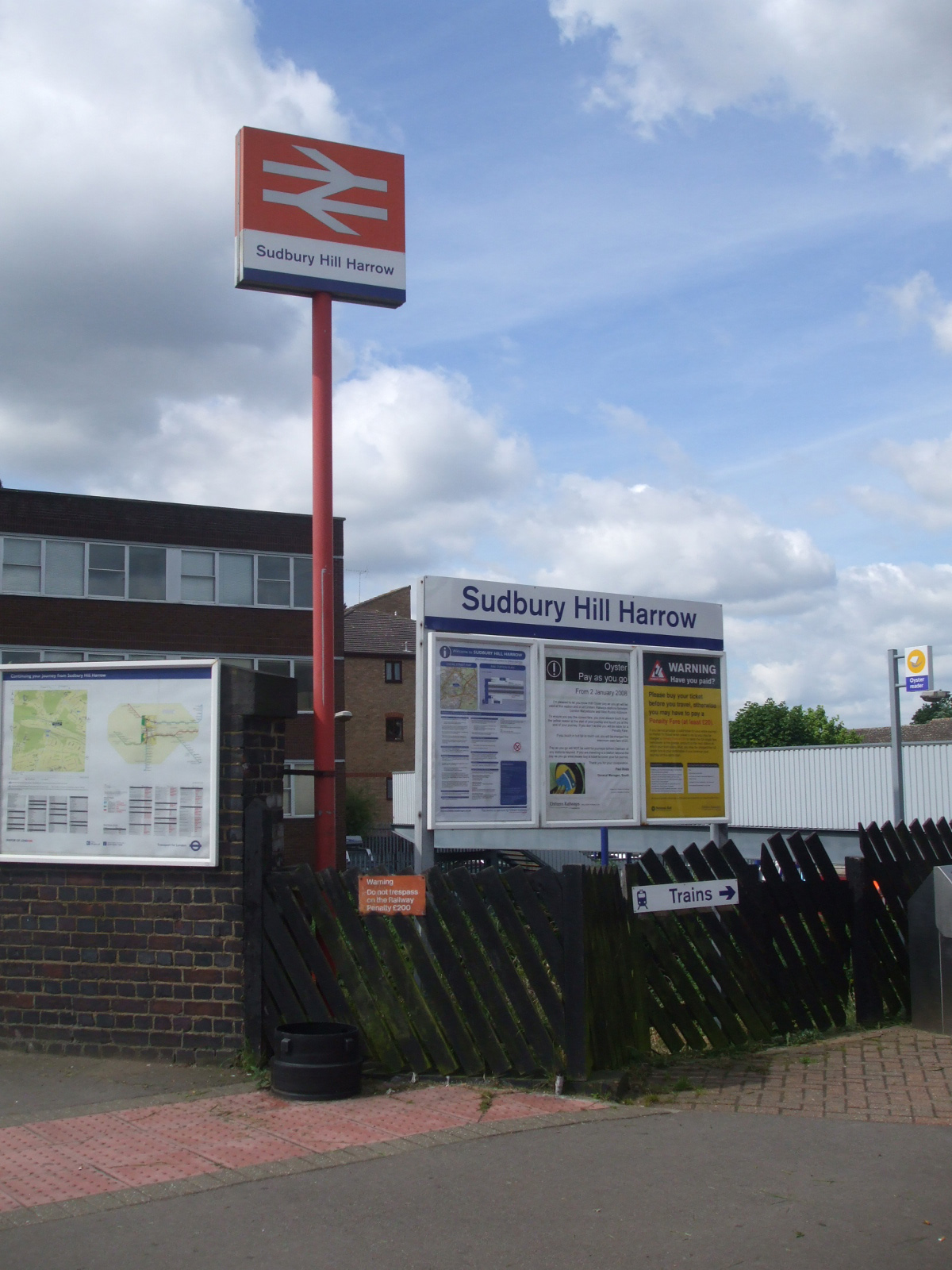
- Interactive map of Sudbury Hill Harrow

General information
- Location: Harrow on the Hill
- Local authority: London Borough of Harrow
- Managed by: Chiltern Railways
- Station code: SDH
- DfT category: F2
- Number of platforms: 2
- Fare zone: 4
- OSI: Sudbury Hill

National Rail annual entry and exit
- 2021–22: ▲35,292
- 2022–23: ▲47,630
- 2023–24: ▼41,460
- 2024–25: ▲53,868
- 2025–26: ▲63,526

Key dates
- 1 March 1906: Opened as South Harrow
- 19 July 1926: Renamed Sudbury Hill Harrow

Other information
- External links: Departures; Facilities
- Coordinates: 51.5589°N 0.3358°W

Sudbury Hill Harrow railway station is a National Rail station on the Chiltern Main Line in the London Borough of Harrow in northwest London.

The station is served by Chiltern Railways trains from Marylebone towards High Wycombe and Birmingham Snow Hill, and is in London fare zone 4. This station also has an Oyster card facility located at the entrance and exit. The station is situated between Northolt Park and Sudbury & Harrow Road stations. The station is close to Sudbury Hill Underground station on the Piccadilly line.

== History ==
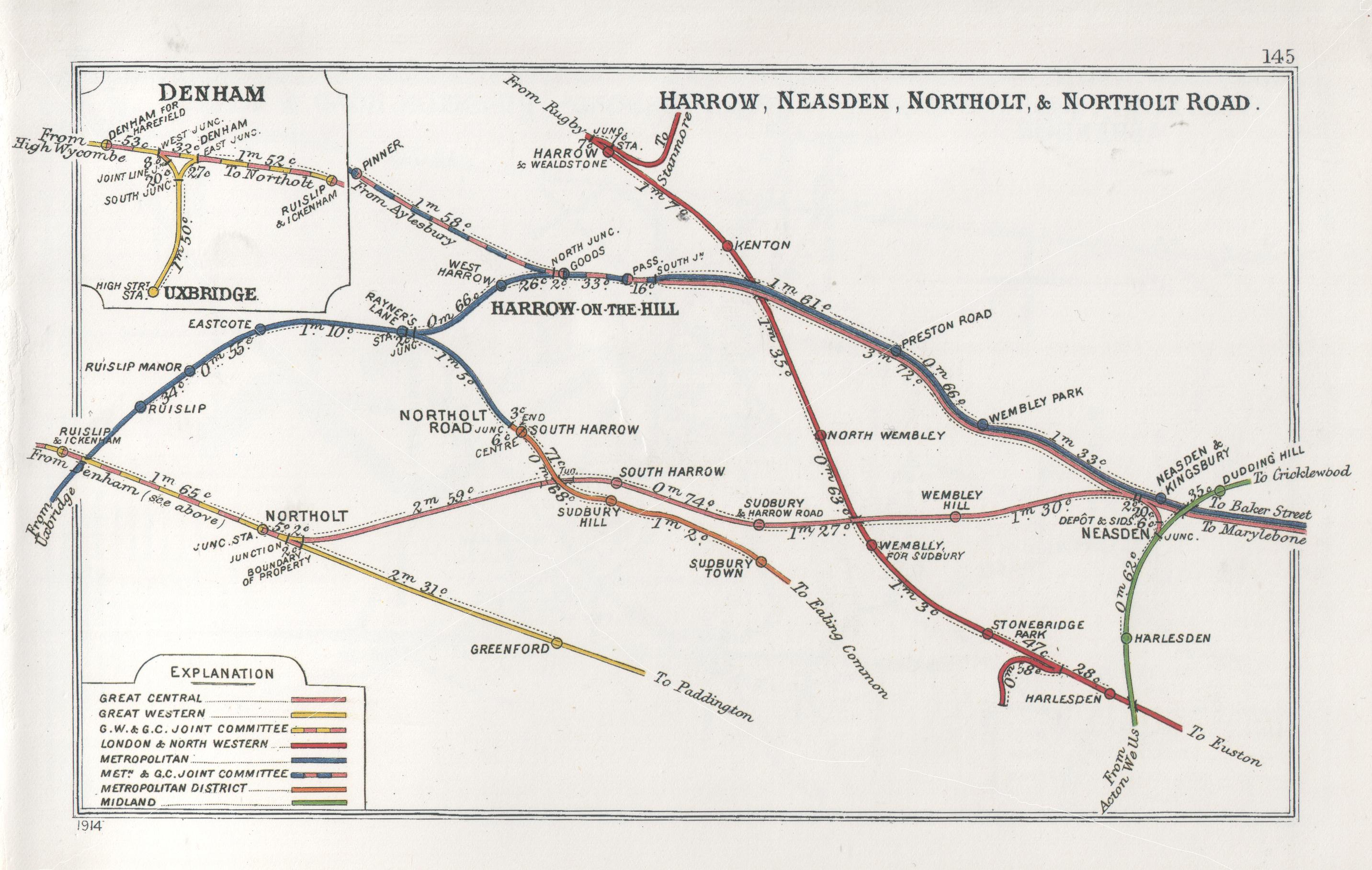
A 1914 Railway Clearing House map of railways in the vicinity of Sudbury Hill Harrow (shown here as South Harrow)

On 20 November 1905 the Great Central Railway opened a new route for freight trains between Neasden Junction and Northolt Junction. Passenger services from Marylebone began on 1 March 1906, when three new stations were opened: Wembley Hill, Sudbury & Harrow Road and South Harrow. On 2 April 1906 these services were extended to Northolt Junction. On 19 July 1926 South Harrow station was renamed Sudbury Hill Harrow.

The service was reduced to peak hours only from 7 September 1964, due to a lack of demand. There was a temporary closure from 22 September 1990 to 7 October 1990. In November 2004, however, following concerted efforts by the London Transport Users Committee (now known as London TravelWatch) an hourly off-peak service was introduced.

== Services ==
All services at Sudbury Hill Harrow are operated by Chiltern Railways.

The typical off-peak service is one train per hour in each direction between London Marylebone and High Wycombe. Additional services call at the station during the peak hours.

No services call at the station on weekends.

Preceding station	National Rail	Following station
Northolt Park	Chiltern Railways Chiltern Main Line Monday-Friday only	Wembley Stadium
Northolt Park	Chiltern Railways Chiltern Main Line Monday-Friday only	Sudbury & Harrow Road Limited Service

== Connections ==
London Buses routes 92 and H17 serve the station.

== Gallery ==
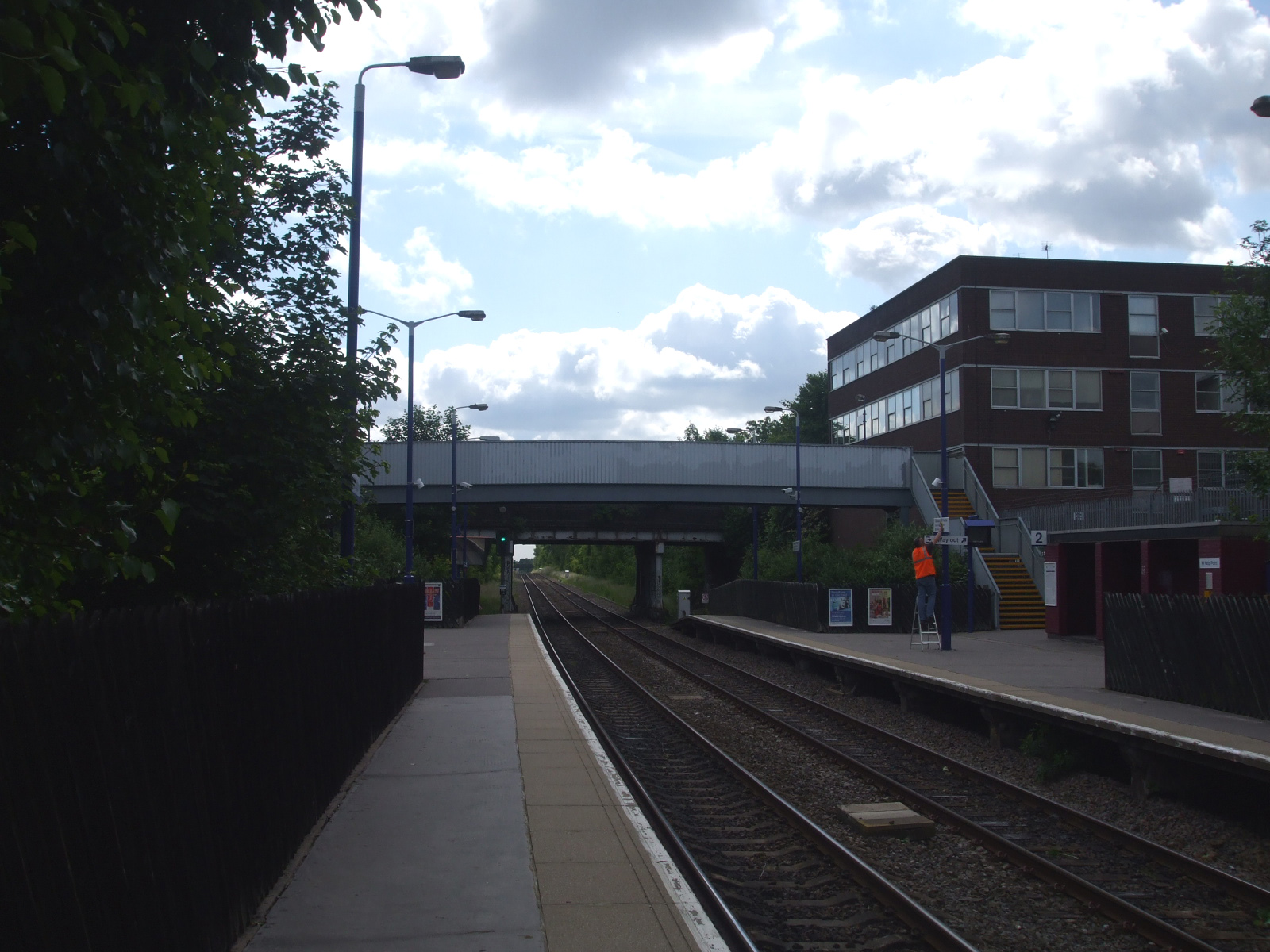
Looking eastbound

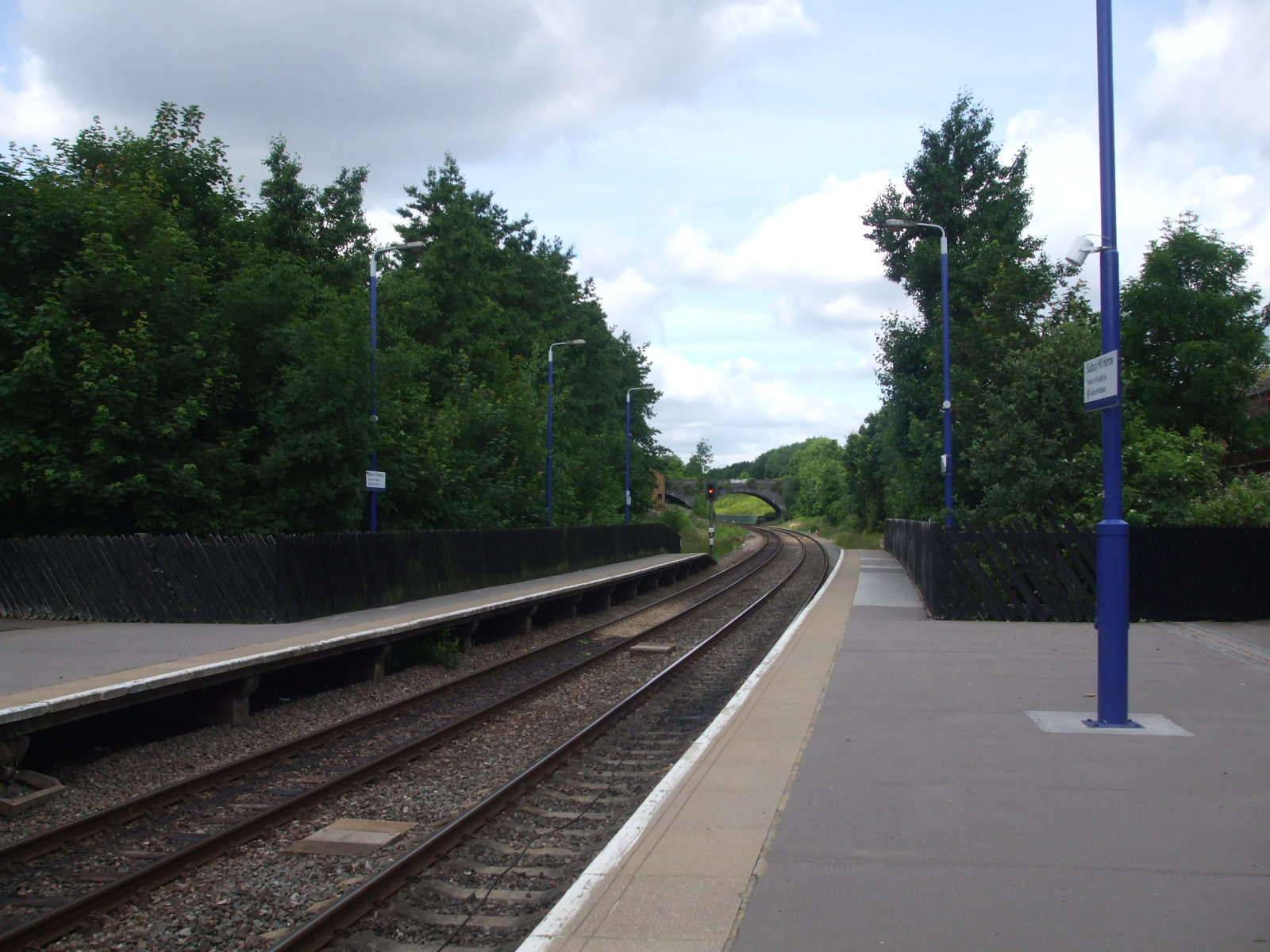
Looking westbound

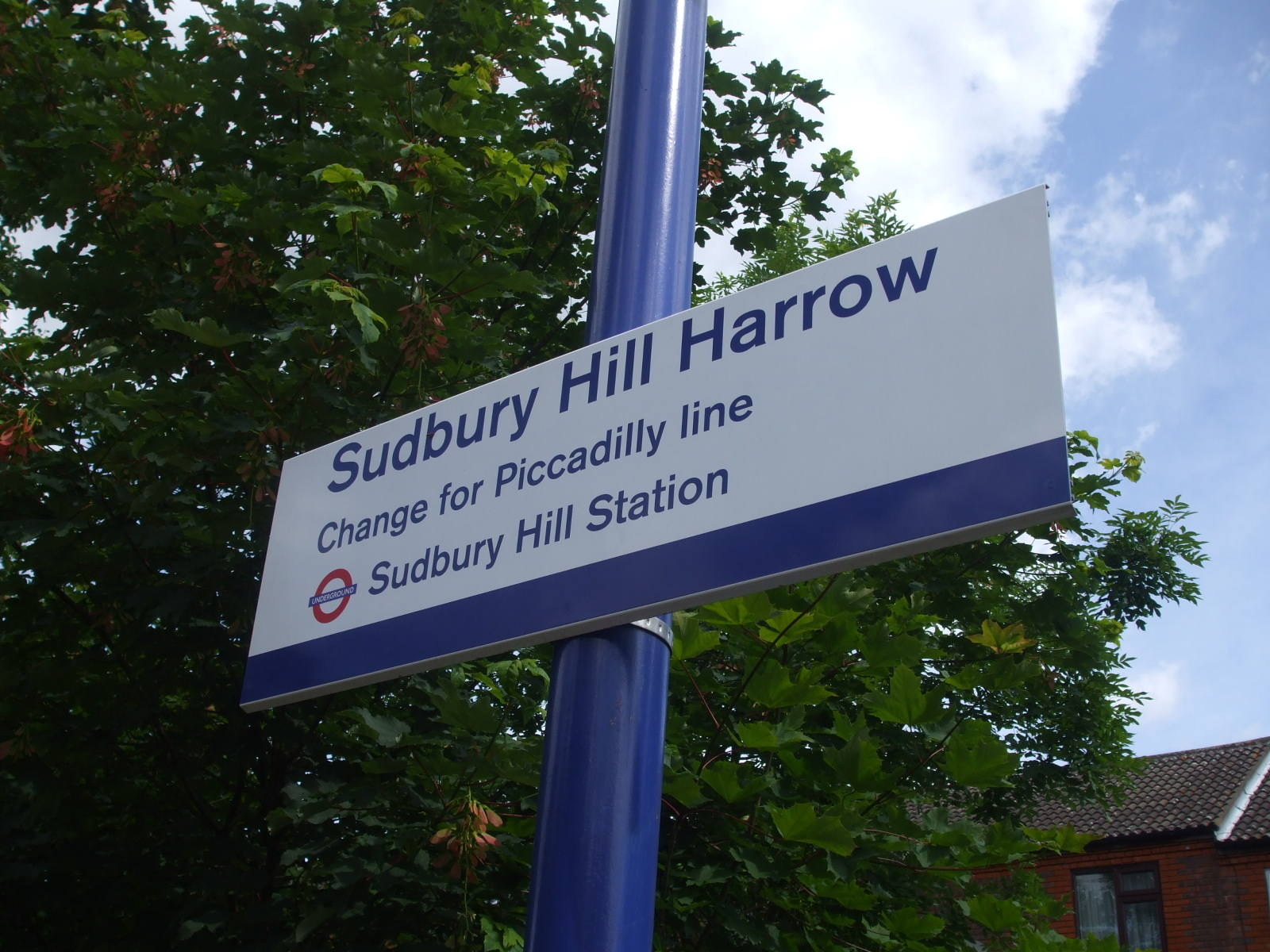
Signage on eastbound platform, indicating proximity to Sudbury Hill Underground station
