= Wembley Exhibition railway station =

Former railway station in England

Wembley Stadium
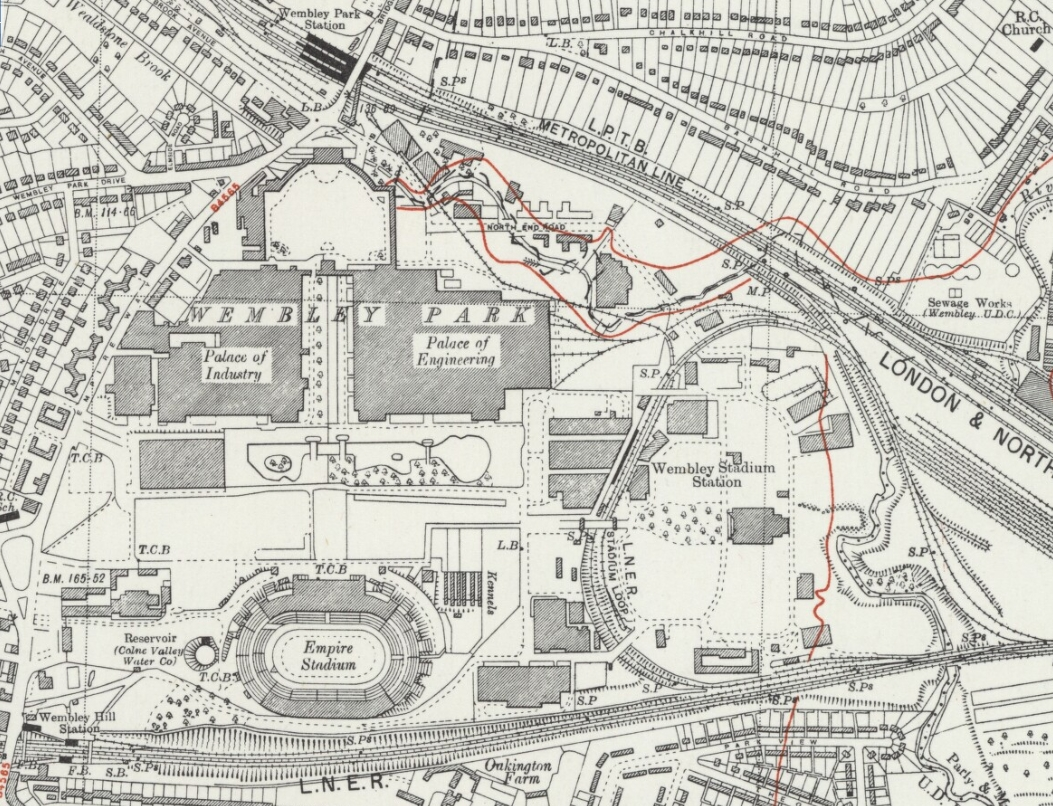
- Marked as Wembley Stadium station (centre-right), 1938
- Interactive map of Wembley Stadium

General information
- Location: Wembley
- Local authority: London Borough of Brent

Railway companies
- Original company: London and North Eastern Railway

Key dates
- 28 April 1923: Opened as Exhibition Station, Wembley
- ?: Renamed Wembley Exhibition
- by February 1928: Renamed Wembley Stadium
- 18 May 1968: Last train
- 1 September 1969: Officially Closed

Other information
- Coordinates: 51.5581°N 0.2735°W

Exhibition Station (Wembley) was a railway station in Wembley Park in what is now the London Borough of Brent. It was built on a spur to connect the 1924-5 British Empire Exhibition to London Marylebone.

Exhibition Station opened on 28 April 1923, the day of Wembley Stadium's first FA cup final. It was later renamed Wembley Exhibition, and then, in February 1928, Wembley Stadium (now the name of the former Wembley Hill station to the southwest) of Exhibition Station (Wembley).

It was only really used to transport spectators to Wembley events. It stopped carrying passengers in May 1968 and officially closed on 1 September 1969.

== Services ==
Preceding station	Disused railways	Following station
Terminus	London & North Eastern Railway; Wembley Exhibition Loop	London Marylebone
