= Wembley Stadium railway station =

National Rail station in London, England

Wembley Stadium
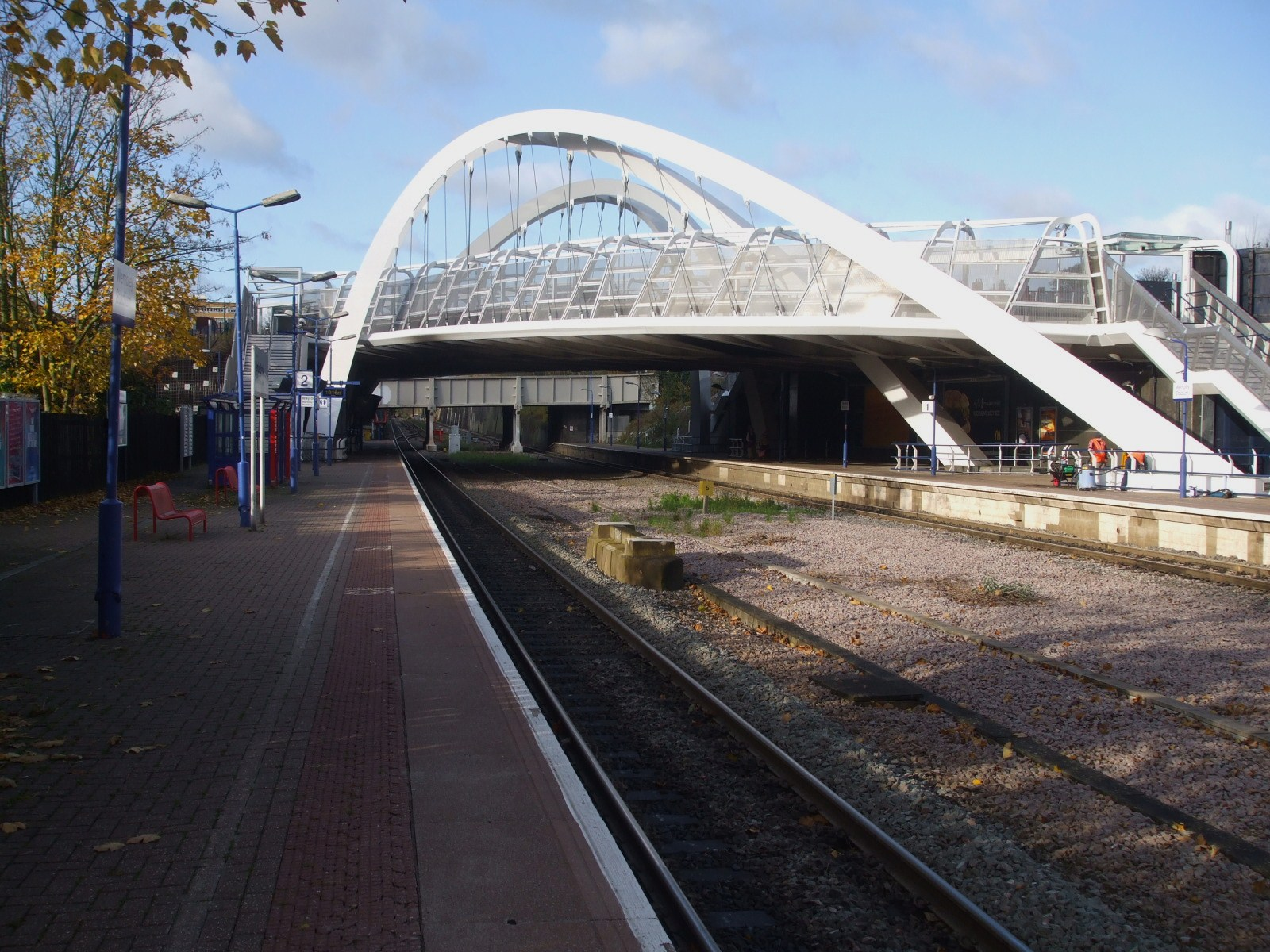
- Station platform with White Horse Bridge above
- Interactive map of Wembley Stadium

General information
- Location: Wembley
- Local authority: London Borough of Brent
- Managed by: Chiltern Railways
- Station code: WCX
- DfT category: F1
- Number of platforms: 2
- Fare zone: 4

National Rail annual entry and exit
- 2020–21: ▼72,036
- 2021–22: ▲0.357 million
- 2022–23: ▲0.657 million
- 2023–24: ▲0.677 million
- 2024–25: ▲0.885 million

Key dates
- 1 March 1906: opened as Wembley Hill
- 8 May 1978: renamed Wembley Complex
- 11 May 1987: renamed Wembley Stadium

Other information
- External links: Departures; Facilities
- Coordinates: 51.5543°N 0.2863°W

Wembley Stadium railway station is a National Rail station in Wembley, Greater London, on the Chiltern Main Line. It is the nearest station to Wembley Stadium, and is located a quarter of a mile (400 m) south west of the sports venue. It is in London fare zone 4.

== History ==
=== First Wembley Stadium station ===
The first station to bear the name Wembley Stadium, at (51.558638°N 0.273010°W), about one-half mile (800 m) east-north-east of the present station, was opened by the LNER on 28 April 1923 as The Exhibition Station (Wembley). It had one platform, and was situated on a loop which forked off the Chiltern Main Line between Neasden Junction and Wembley Hill station (now Wembley Stadium station, see below). It then curved round in a clockwise direction to regain the Chiltern Main Line at a point slightly closer to Neasden Junction. The connections faced London to allow an intensive service with no reversing. The station was renamed several times, becoming Wembley Stadium station in 1928. The station was last used on 18 May 1968 for the 1968 FA Cup final between Everton v West Bromwich Albion, and was officially closed on 1 September 1969.

Traces of the line can be seen on maps and in aerial photographs. It was normally used only for passenger services for events at the stadium or the Empire Pool within the estate, built for the 1924-25 British Empire Exhibition. Temporary sidings led into the "Palace of Engineering" exhibition hall where both the Great Western Railway's locomotive Caerphilly Castle and the London and North Eastern Railway's Flying Scotsman were displayed, with each claimed by its owners to be the most powerful passenger locomotive in Britain.

=== Present station ===
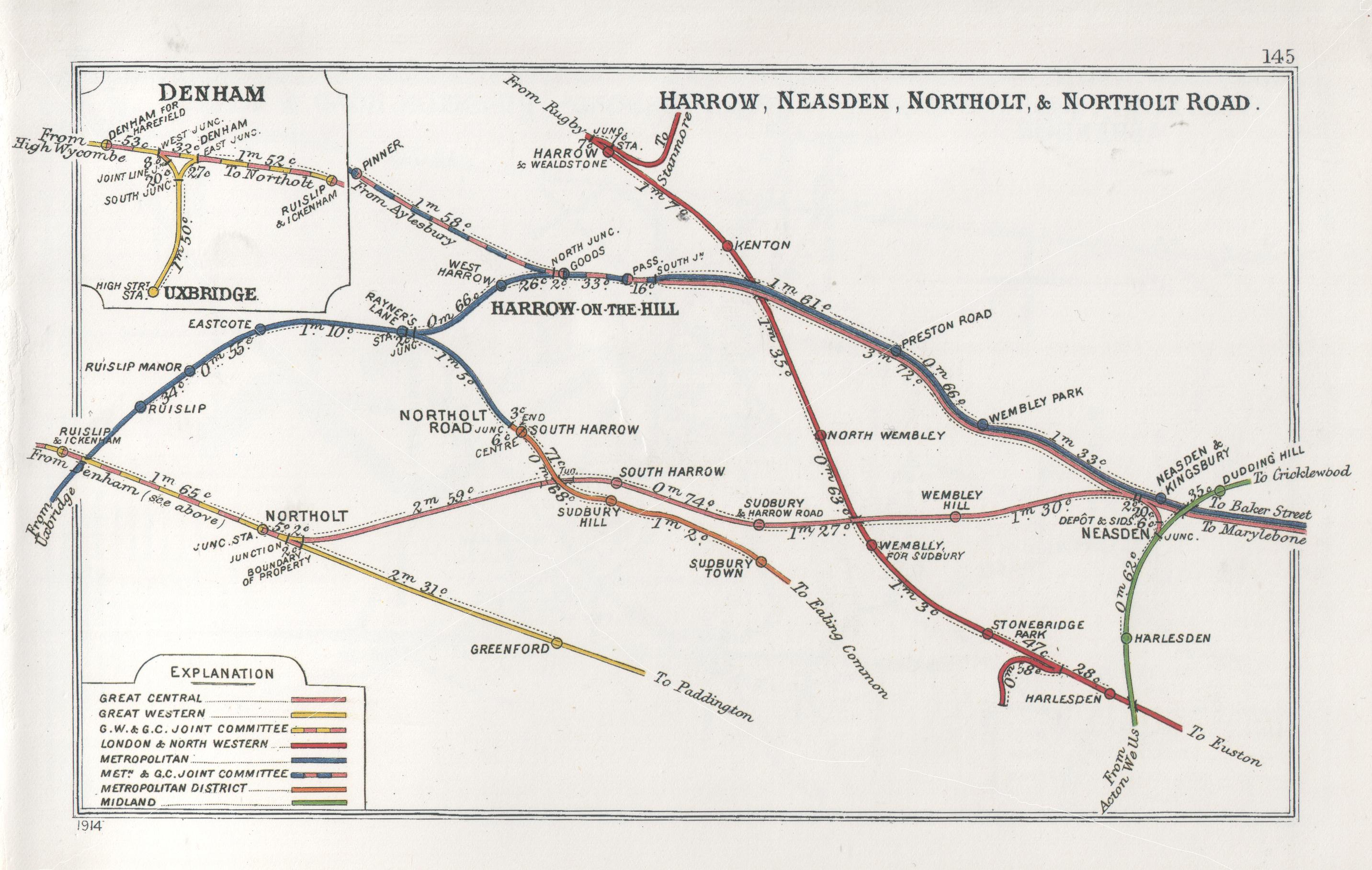
A 1914 Railway Clearing House map of railways in the vicinity of Wembley Stadium (shown here as Wembley Hill)

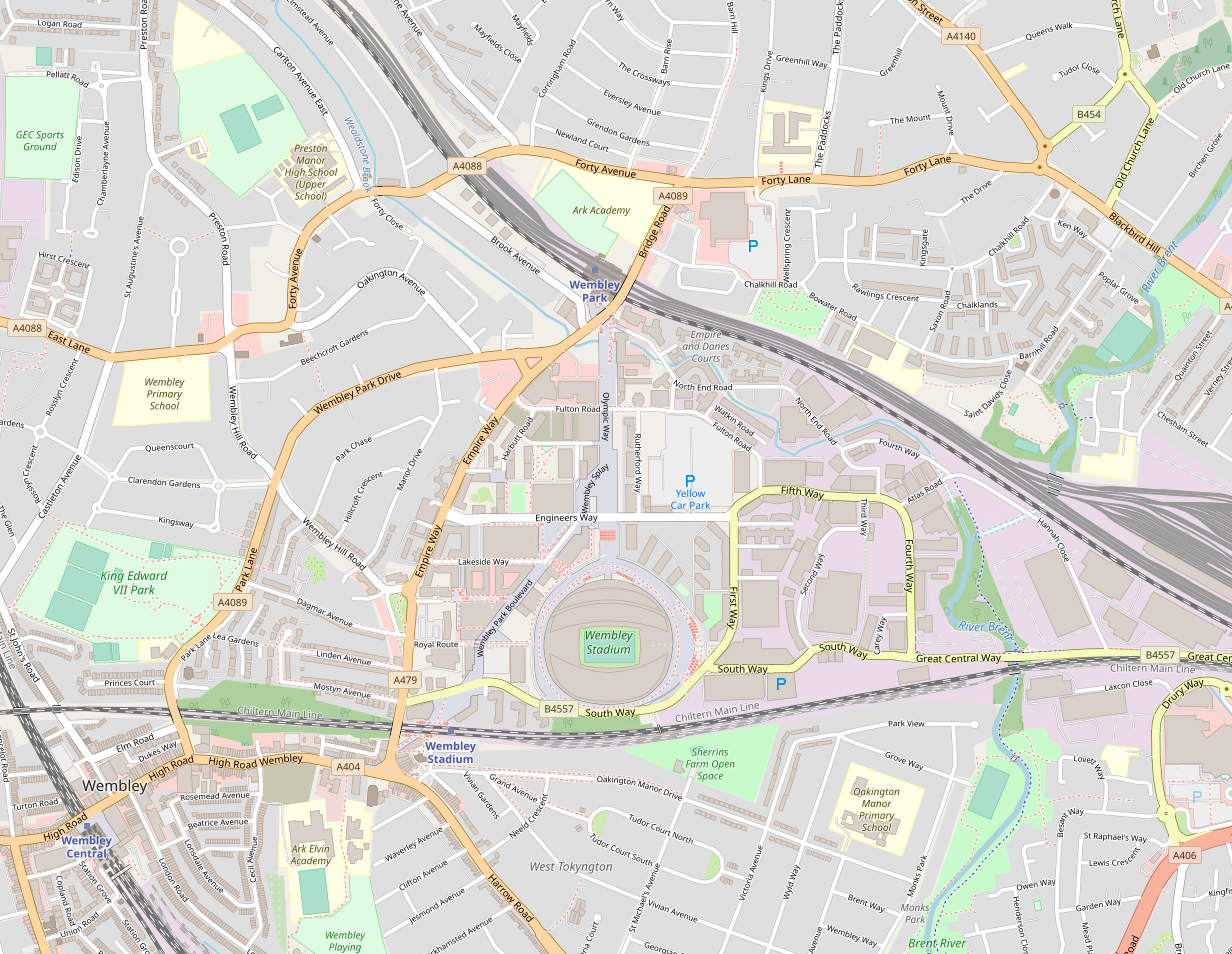
A map of Wembley Stadium in relation to Olympic Way, Wembley Central, Wembley Stadium and Wembley Park stations, and the A406 North Circular road (bottom right)

On 20 November 1905, the Great Central Railway opened a new route for freight trains between Neasden Junction and Northolt Junction. Passenger services from Marylebone began on 1 March 1906, when three new stations were opened: Wembley Hill, Sudbury & Harrow Road and South Harrow. On 2 April 1906 these services were extended to Northolt Junction.

Wembley Hill station was renamed Wembley Complex on 8 May 1978 in order to indicate its proximity to the nearby sports facilities, as well as to a recently opened conference centre, before getting its present name Wembley Stadium on 11 May 1987. There were originally four tracks with the two platforms on passing loops outside the inner non-stop running lines; the current two-track layout dates from the 1960s. The 4 tracks were closed for a week by a 200 yards (180 m) landslide in a cutting near the station from 18 February 1918.

== Services ==
All services at Wembley Stadium are operated by Chiltern Railways.

The typical off-peak service in trains per hour is:

- 2 tph to London Marylebone
- 1 tph to High Wycombe (stopping)
- 1 tph to Oxford (semi-fast)

Additional services, including trains to and from Aylesbury and Banbury call at the station during the peak hours. In addition, during events at Wembley Stadium, longer distance services make additional calls at the station.

Preceding station	National Rail	Following station
Sudbury Hill Harrow	Chiltern Railways Chiltern Main Line	London Marylebone
Sudbury & Harrow Road Limited Service	Chiltern Railways Chiltern Main Line	London Marylebone

== Connections ==
London Buses routes 83, 92, 182, 223, 440, 483 and night route N83 serve the station.

It is bounded to the south by the Harrow Road (A404 road).

== Gallery ==
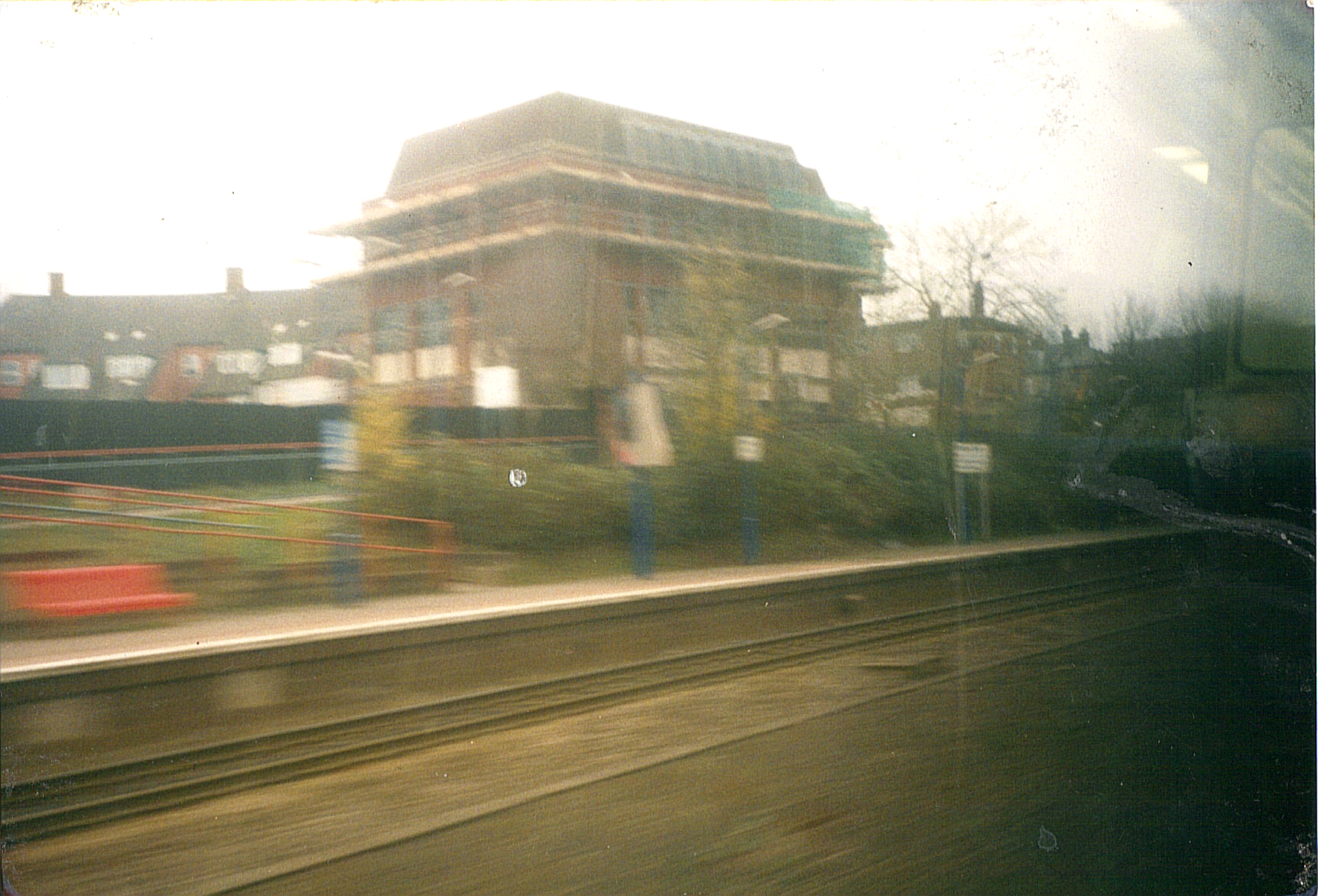
Wembley stadium station in 2001, before it was modernised

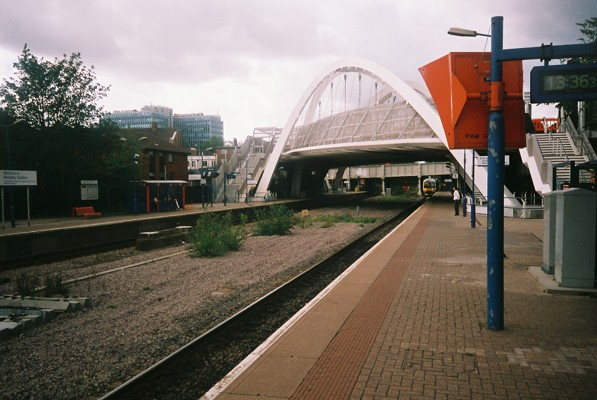
The station with the 'White Horse Bridge' above it
