= Marylebone station =

National Rail terminus and London Underground station

Marylebone
- London Marylebone
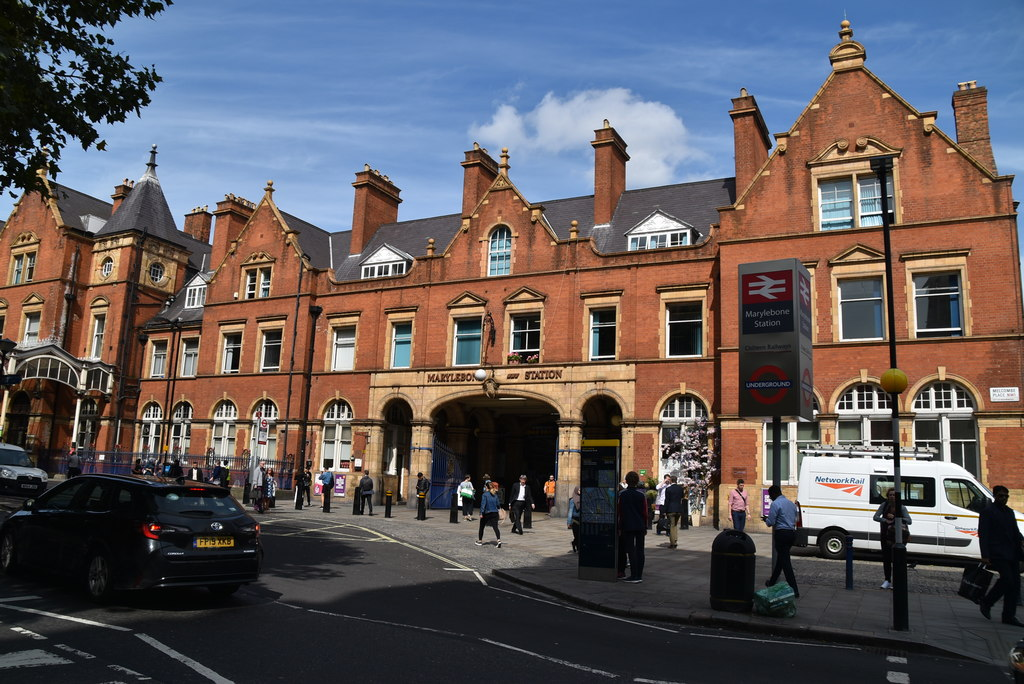
- Main entrance
- Interactive map of Marylebone

General information
- Location: Marylebone
- Local authority: City of Westminster
- Managed by: Chiltern Railways; London Underground
- Owner: Network Rail
- Station code: MYB
- DfT category: A
- Number of platforms: 6
- Accessible: Yes
- Fare zone: 1
- OSI: Baker Street; Edgware Road (CDH); Paddington (NR); Marylebone

National Rail annual entry and exit
- 2020–21: ▼2.035 million
- Interchange: ▼0.111 million
- 2021–22: ▲7.488 million
- Interchange: ▲0.514 million
- 2022–23: ▲10.308 million
- Interchange: ▲0.742 million
- 2023–24: ▲10.966 million
- Interchange: ▲1.125 million
- 2024–25: ▲11.773 million
- Interchange: ▼1.036 million

Railway companies
- Original company: Great Central Railway
- Pre-grouping: Great Central Railway
- Post-grouping: London & North Eastern Railway

Key dates
- 15 March 1899: Opened

Other information
- External links: Departures; Facilities
- Coordinates: 51.5223°N 0.1634°W

Marylebone station (/ˈmɑːrlɪbən/ MAR-li-bən, also /ˈmɑːrlɪbəʊn/) is a Central London railway terminus and connected London Underground station in the Marylebone area of the City of Westminster. On the National Rail network, it is also known as London Marylebone and is the southern terminus of the Chiltern Main Line to Birmingham. The London Underground station is on the Bakerloo line between Edgware Road and Baker Street stations, in London fare zone 1.

The station opened on 15 March 1899 as the London terminus of the Great Central Main Line (GCML), the last major railway to open in Britain for 100 years, linking the capital to the cities of Leicester, Sheffield and Manchester. Marylebone was the last of London's main line termini to be built and is one of the smallest, opening with half of the platforms originally planned. There has been an interchange with the Bakerloo line since 1907, but not with any other lines.

Traffic declined at Marylebone from the mid-20th century, particularly after the GCML closed. By the 1980s, the station was threatened with closure, but was reprieved because of commuter traffic on the London to Aylesbury Line (a remaining part of the GCML) and from High Wycombe. In 1993, the station found a new role as the terminus of the Chiltern Main Line. Following the privatisation of British Rail, the station was expanded with two additional platforms in 2006 and improved services to Birmingham Snow Hill. In 2015, services began between Marylebone and Oxford Parkway, via a new chord connecting the main line to the Oxford to Bicester Line and an extension to Oxford following in 2016. As of 2020, it is the only main London terminus to host only diesel trains, as none of the National Rail lines into it are electrified.

Marylebone is one of the four station squares on the British Monopoly board and is a popular film-making location because of its relative quietness compared to other London termini.

== Location ==
The station stands on Melcombe Place just north of Marylebone Road, a straight west-to-east thoroughfare through Marylebone in Central London; Baker Street is close by to the east and south-east. It is in the northern, Lisson Grove, neighbourhood of the district, in a northern projection of the Bryanston and Dorset Square ward immediately south of St John's Wood. North-east is Regent's Park, north in a network of mostly residential streets is Lord's Cricket Ground and south, south-west and south-east are a mixed-use network of streets. Other nearby London termini are Euston and Paddington.

A number of TfL bus routes serve the station.

== National Rail ==
The main line National Rail station has six platforms: two built in 1899, two inserted into the former carriage road in the 1980s and two added in September 2006. It is the only non-electrified railway terminus in London. Marylebone is operated by Chiltern Railways, making it one of the few London terminus stations not to be managed by Network Rail.

Chiltern Railways operates all services at the station, accessing the Chiltern Main Line and London to Aylesbury Line routes; these serve High Wycombe, Aylesbury, Bicester, Banbury, Leamington Spa, Warwick, Solihull, Birmingham Moor Street, Birmingham Snow Hill, and (at peak hours) Stourbridge Junction. There are services to Oxford, via the Oxford to Bicester Line, and some services to Stratford-upon-Avon, via the Leamington to Stratford branch line.

=== History ===
==== GCR and LNER ====
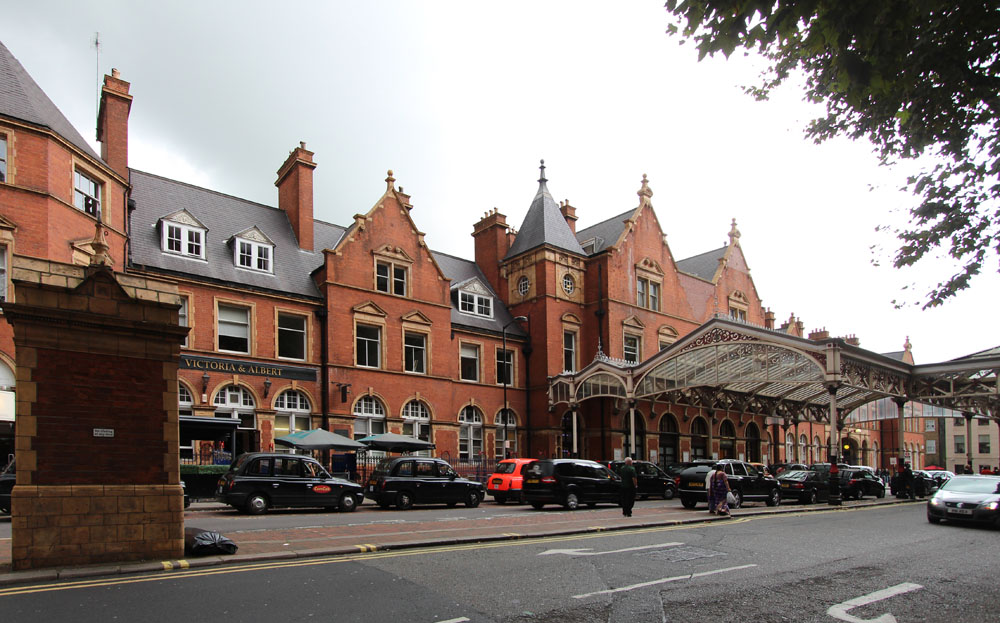
The facade of Marylebone station, designed by Henry William Braddock

The early history of Marylebone is tied into the Great Central Railway (GCR)'s Great Central Main Line (GCML) extension into London. When Sir Edward Watkin became chairman of the Manchester, Sheffield and Lincolnshire Railway (MS&LR) in 1864, the line was not particularly lucrative as it had no direct connection to London. Watkin was unhappy about transferring traffic to the Great Northern Railway and, when he became chairman of the Metropolitan Railway in 1872, he decided to build a dedicated line between the MS&LR and Central London.

The approach to Marylebone was the last section of the Great Central Main Line to be built. Progress was delayed in the 1890s because of objections, particularly as the line would pass through Lord's, the principal cricket ground in London and home of Marylebone Cricket Club. Watkin promised that Lord's would not be disrupted by the railway construction and an act of Parliament to complete the line was passed on 28 March 1893. The station was built on a 51-acre (21 ha) site around Blandford and Harewood Squares, west of Regent's Park. More than 4,000 working-class people were evicted from their homes to turn Harewood Avenue and Rossmore Road into approach roads; around 2,600 of them were rehomed in new apartments near St. John's Wood Road. Watkin resigned the chairmanship in 1894, following ill-health, and was replaced by Lord Wharncliffe. The approach to the station through Lord's was achieved by a cut-and-cover tunnel constructed between September 1896 and May 1897, avoiding the cancellation of any cricket.

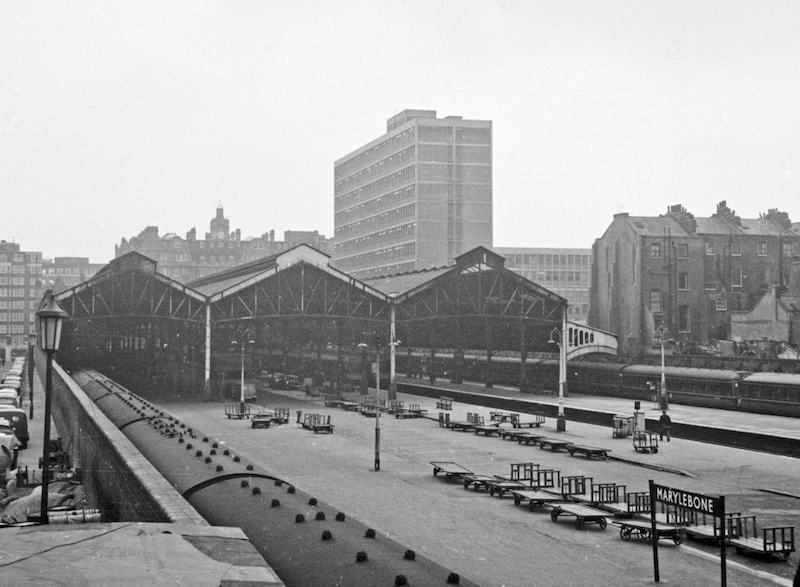
Marylebone station in 1966; it has since been redesigned with two replacement platforms

The station opened to coal traffic on 27 July 1898 and to passengers on 15 March 1899. It was the terminus of the GCR's London extension main line – the last major railway line to be built into London until High Speed 1. The Great Central Railway linked London to stations in High Wycombe, Aylesbury, Rugby, Leicester, Nottingham, Sheffield and Manchester. Local services from north-west Middlesex, High Wycombe and Aylesbury also terminated at Marylebone. The GCR moved its headquarters to Marylebone from Manchester in 1905.

The station was designed by Henry William Braddock, a civil engineer for the GCR. It has a modest design owing to the GCR's lack of money. The main booking hall is 63 feet (19.2 m) by 40 feet 6 inches (12.3 m). It is a domestic version of the Wrenaissance revival style that fits in with the residential surroundings with Dutch gables, employing warm brick and cream-coloured stone. The GCR crest was worked into the wrought iron railings in numerous places.

The original plan was for eight platforms, but half were designated as a "possible future extension" and the cost of building the GCML was greater than expected. The line leading to the station cut through 70 acres (28 ha) of middle-class housing, including the Eyre Estate in St John's Wood and the area around Lord's, drawing protests and requiring a relocation of the track and station facilities. There was never enough money for the extra platforms and only four were built: three inside the train shed and one to its west (platform 4). As a result, the concourse is unusually long and had three walls for most of the 20th century. The northern wall was missing, as the GCR anticipated that the other four platforms, under an extended train shed, would be built later on. An office block was later built on the vacant site. The cost of the London Extension meant that the adjoining Great Central Hotel, designed by Sir Robert William Ellis, was built by a different company. The hotel operated for a relatively short time and was converted to offices in 1945, becoming the headquarters of British Rail from 1948 to 1986. The offices were restored as a hotel in 1993.

The GCR constructed an engine shed at the site in 1897, but it was short lived. A locomotive servicing area, consisting of a turntable and coaling stage remained in use until the end of steam traction at the station in 1966.

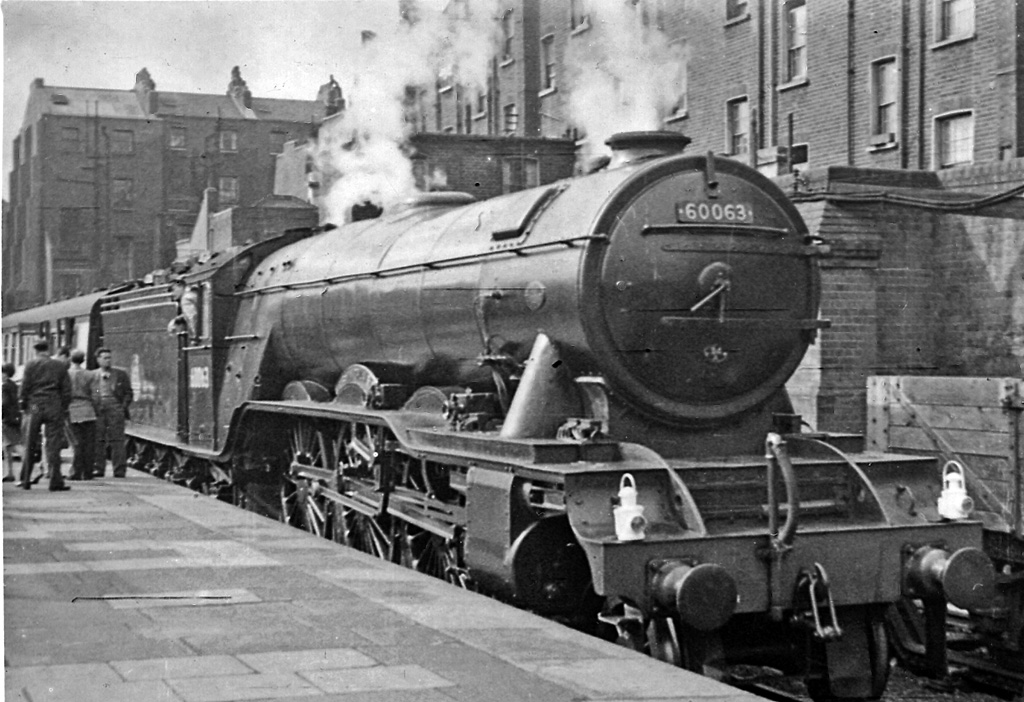
A Manchester-bound express waiting at Marylebone in 1956, headed by an A3 Pacific

Passenger traffic on the GCR was never heavy because it was the last main line to be built; it therefore had difficulty competing against longer-established rivals, especially the Midland Railway from its terminal at St Pancras, for the lucrative inter-city passenger business. Low passenger traffic meant Marylebone was the quietest and most pleasant of London's termini. The GCR was unhappy about having to use part of the Metropolitan Railway's route to reach Marylebone and opened a new line to High Wycombe on 2 April 1906. The additional suburban services generated traffic for the station, which had previously been so empty on occasion that the staff outnumbered passengers. While passenger traffic remained relatively sparse, the line was heavily used for freight, especially coal; in 1914, 67% of traffic was goods-related. Trains ran from the north and East Midlands to the freight depot adjoining the station, which was marginally the largest in London.

The heyday of the line was between 1923, when the GCR was absorbed into the London and North Eastern Railway (LNER) and 1948, when the LNER was nationalised to form the British Rail Eastern Region. As a result, many prestigious locomotives were frequent visitors to the line; these included Flying Scotsman, Sir Nigel Gresley and Mallard which ran on the East Coast Main Line. Special trains ran on the line to destinations such as Scotland. The station's busiest use came after the construction of Wembley Stadium in 1923, when it was used to contain large crowds wishing to see the FA Cup Final. Special services ran from Marylebone to the British Empire Exhibition at Wembley Park the following year.

Unlike other London termini, Marylebone saw little direct damage during the Blitz. It was closed between 5 October and 26 November 1940, after the approach tunnels were breached and the goods depot was bombed on 16 April 1941.

==== British Rail ====
After the nationalisation of British Railways in 1948, Marylebone was initially kept open as a long-distance station. New services were introduced, including the Master Cutler service to Sheffield and the South Yorkshireman to Bradford, but they were not well-used. From 1949, all local services towards High Wycombe and Princes Risborough were routed into Marylebone, although the frequency of trains was reduced two years later.

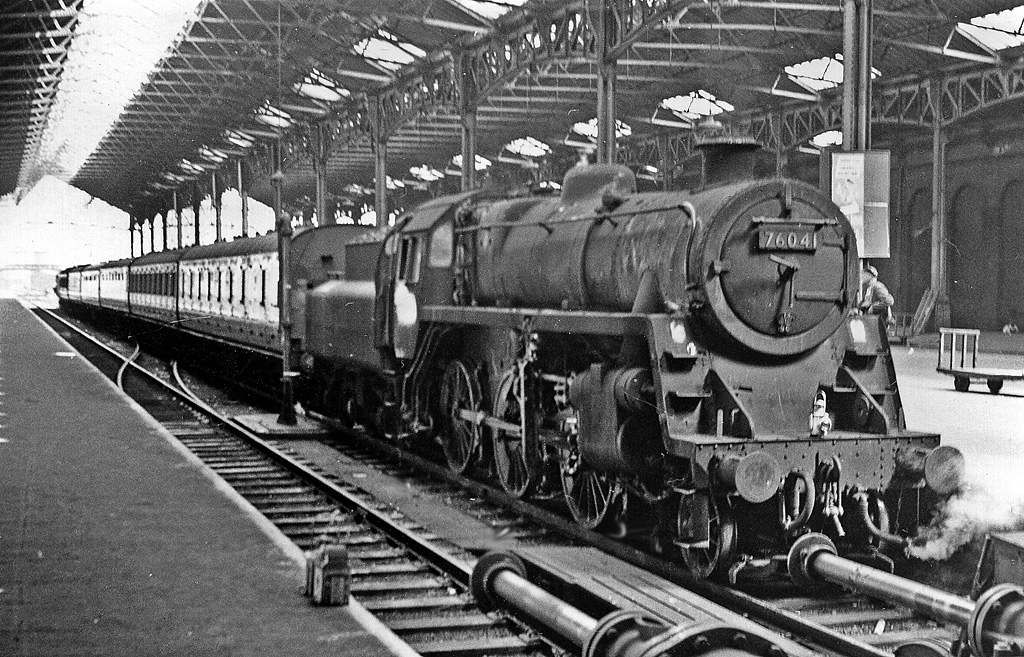
A local train facing London in 1961

The Great Central Main Line duplicated the route of the Midland Main Line and long-distance trains from Marylebone were scaled back from 1958, leading to the closure of the Great Central Main Line north of Aylesbury as part of the Beeching Axe. The rundown of services began after the line was transferred from British Railways' Eastern Region to the London Midland Region, although the station and the first few miles of its route had been part of the Western Region from 1950. In 1958, the Master Cutler was diverted to London King's Cross and the East Coast Main Line. In 1960, all express services were discontinued, followed by freight in 1965. From then until closure, only a few daily long-distance semi-fast services to Nottingham remained. Marylebone's large goods yard was closed and sold to the Greater London Council for housing. The last long-distance service ran on 4 September 1966, except for a brief reprieve the following year when Paddington was undergoing signal works.

Marylebone was then the terminus for local services to Aylesbury and High Wycombe only, with some services extended to Banbury. They were switched to diesel multiple unit (DMU) operation following the phasing out of steam. British Rail Class 115 DMUs were introduced to local services in 1962. The station was transferred from the Western Region to the London Midland Region in 1973.

===== Closure proposals =====
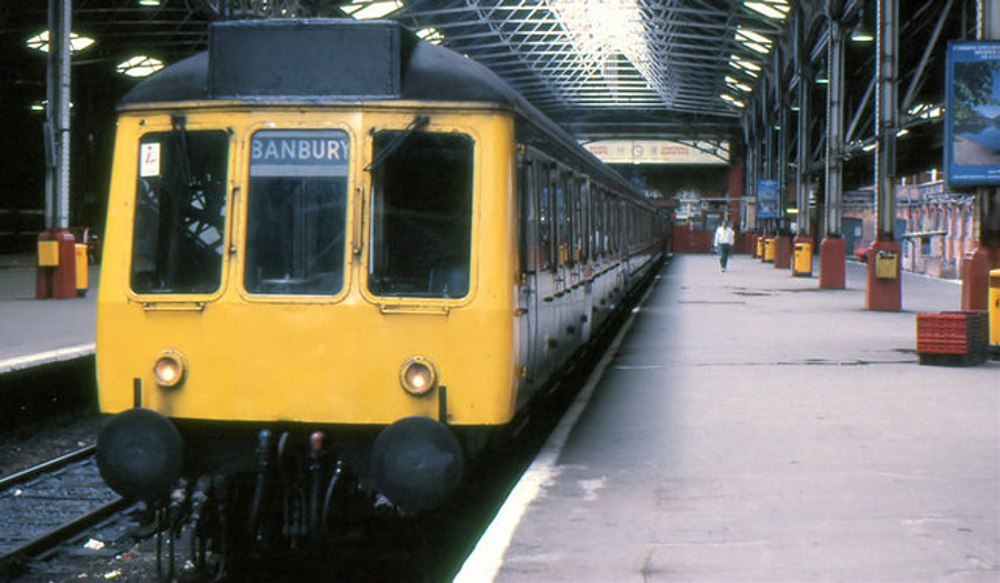
A Class 115 diesel multiple unit at Marylebone in 1986

After the 1960s, lack of investment led to local services and the station becoming increasingly run down. By the early 1980s, Marylebone was under serious threat of closure. In 1983, British Rail chairman Peter Parker commissioned a report into the possibility of converting Marylebone into a high-speed busway, whereby Marylebone would be converted into a coach station. The tracks between Marylebone, Harrow-on-the-Hill and South Ruislip would have closed, and been converted into a road for the exclusive use of buses and coaches. British Rail services via High Wycombe would have been diverted into Paddington and the Aylesbury services would have been taken over by London Underground on an extended Metropolitan line, and then routed to Baker Street.

British Rail formally announced plans to close Marylebone on 15 March 1984, pending a statutory consultation process and closure notices were posted at the station. The proposals proved controversial and faced strong opposition from local authorities and the public, leading to a legal battle which lasted for two years. Despite the pending closure, passenger numbers only dropped by about 400 per day from 1968 levels. The conversion project proved impractical due to the headroom limitations on the line and the closure was quietly dropped.

===== 1986 onwards – revival =====
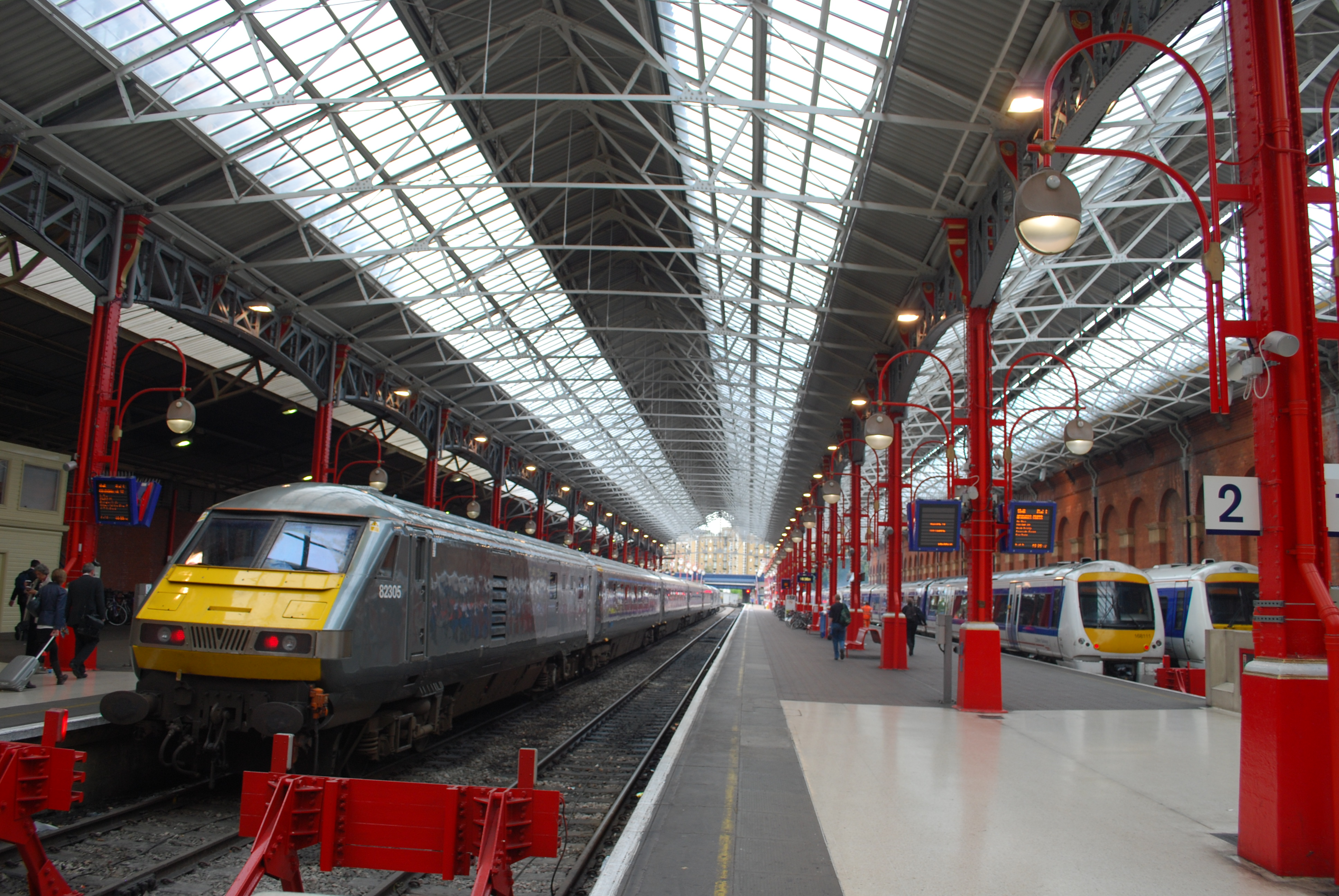
The main trainshed at Marylebone in 2012, with platforms 3–1

The station was revived under the control of the Network SouthEast sector of British Rail. The introduction of the inter-modal and unlimited use Capitalcard (now known as the Travelcard) led to a sharp rise in commuters into London, absorbing the spare capacity at Paddington and Baker Street, eliminating the possibility of Marylebone's services being diverted.

Marylebone was reprieved from the threat of closure on 30 April 1986, and an £85 million modernisation and refurbishment programme of the station and its services was granted. This was funded by selling part of the station to developers, including two of the original four platforms at the west of the station and the third span of the train shed. In order to replace these, the central cab road was removed, and two new platforms numbered 2 and 3 were created in its place. The run-down lines into Marylebone were modernised with new signalling and higher line speeds. In 1991, the fleet of Class 115 trains on local services was replaced by Class 165 Turbo trains and service frequencies were increased. Services to Banbury were extended to the reopened Birmingham Snow Hill station in 1993, creating the first long-distance service into Marylebone since 1966. Initially, this service ran at two-hourly intervals, but it proved popular and was increased to an hourly frequency in 1994.

==== Privatisation ====
After rail privatisation, Chiltern Railways took over the rail services in 1996 and developed the interurban service to Birmingham Snow Hill. In 2002, a service to Kidderminster was opened. The line was restored to double track the same year and Marylebone was expanded in 2006, with two extra platforms in Chiltern's Evergreen 2 project. A new platform (platform 6) was inaugurated in May 2006 while Platform 5 and the shortened platform 4 opened in September. Platforms 5 and 6 were built on the site of the goods sidings and a depot was opened near Wembley Stadium railway station.

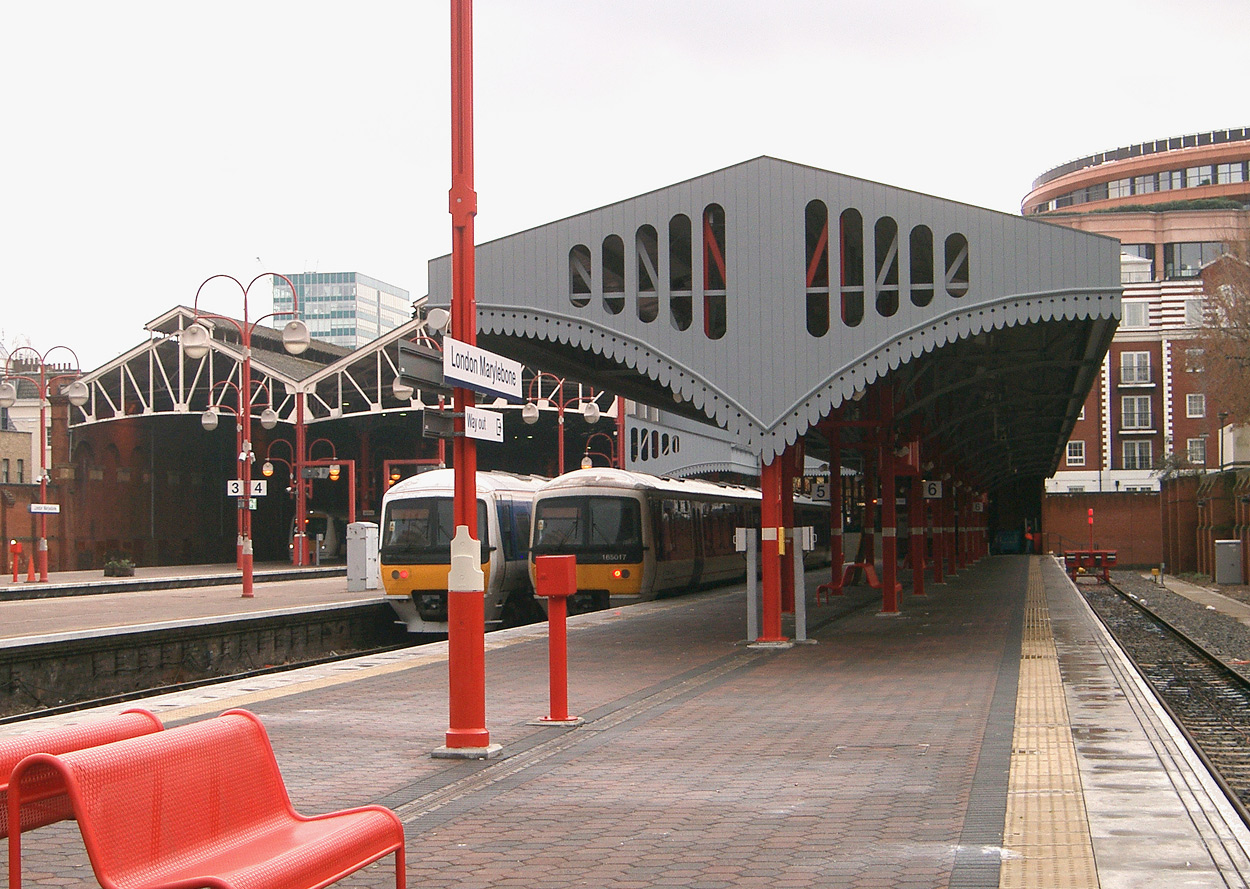
Platforms 5 and 6 were added in 2006 as part of Chiltern Railways' Evergreen 2 project

In September 2007, the Office of Rail Regulation granted the Wrexham Shropshire & Marylebone Railway (WSMR) Company permission to operate services from Wrexham in North Wales via Shrewsbury, Telford and the West Midlands to Marylebone; they started in early 2008, restoring direct London services to Shropshire (Wrexham already being served by a Virgin Trains service to Euston), with five return trips per day on weekdays. This was reduced to four trains a day in March 2009. These services ceased in January 2011, after passenger numbers reduced; the closure was blamed on the Great Recession.

In December 2008, it was proposed to restart direct services between Aberystwyth in mid-Wales and London, which last ran in 1991, with Marylebone as the London terminus. Arriva Trains Wales announced a consultation for two services a day, following the route of the WSMR connecting with the Cambrian Line at Shrewsbury. This idea was abandoned following objections by Wrexham & Shropshire.

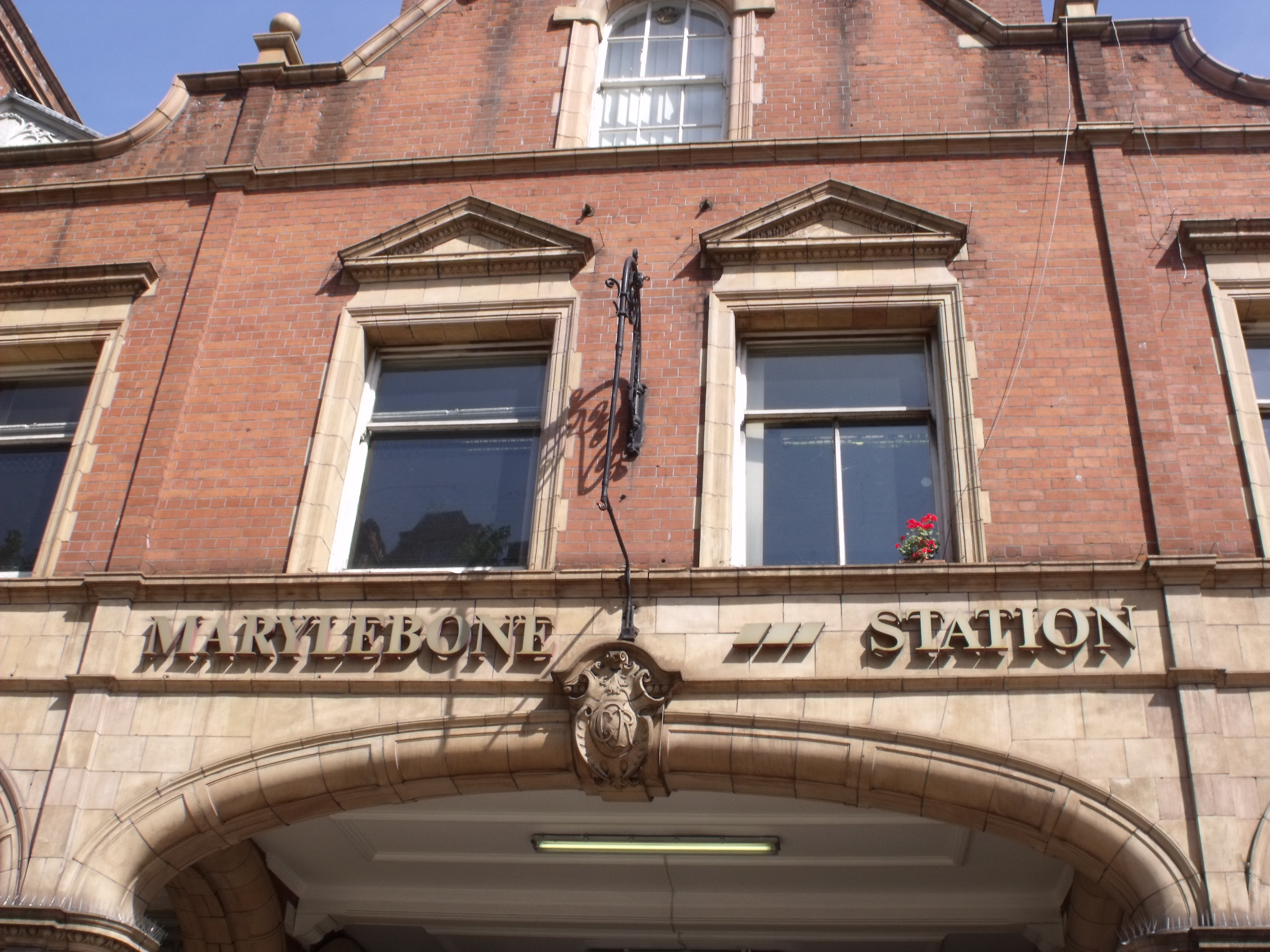
Frieze over the entrance to the station. The logo of the Great Central Railway is just visible in the centre, while that of Network SouthEast (uncoloured) is clearly visible on the right

In 2011, Chiltern Railways took over the Oxford to Bicester Town route from First Great Western; this was in preparation for the opening of a link from the Chiltern Main Line to the Varsity Line, on which Bicester Town station is located, which would see twice-hourly services from Marylebone to Oxford. Construction was expected to start in 2011, but was delayed until the following year after bats were found roosting in one of the tunnels on the Varsity line. Services to Oxford Parkway started in October 2015 and services to Oxford began in December 2016. In 2018, a survey found that commuters from Oxford preferred the Chiltern route to Marylebone over the Great Western route to Paddington via Reading.

In 2017, Network Rail proposed an upgrade of Marylebone with 1,000 extra seats on trains approaching the station. These improvements were planned to be completed by the mid-2020s. Beyond this, improvements to Old Oak Common station are planned to relieve congestion at Marylebone. A Network Rail study reported that any expansion of the station could cost up to £700 million, with Old Oak Common a more feasible alternative for capacity increase.

=== Services ===
Service map of destinations served from Marylebone.

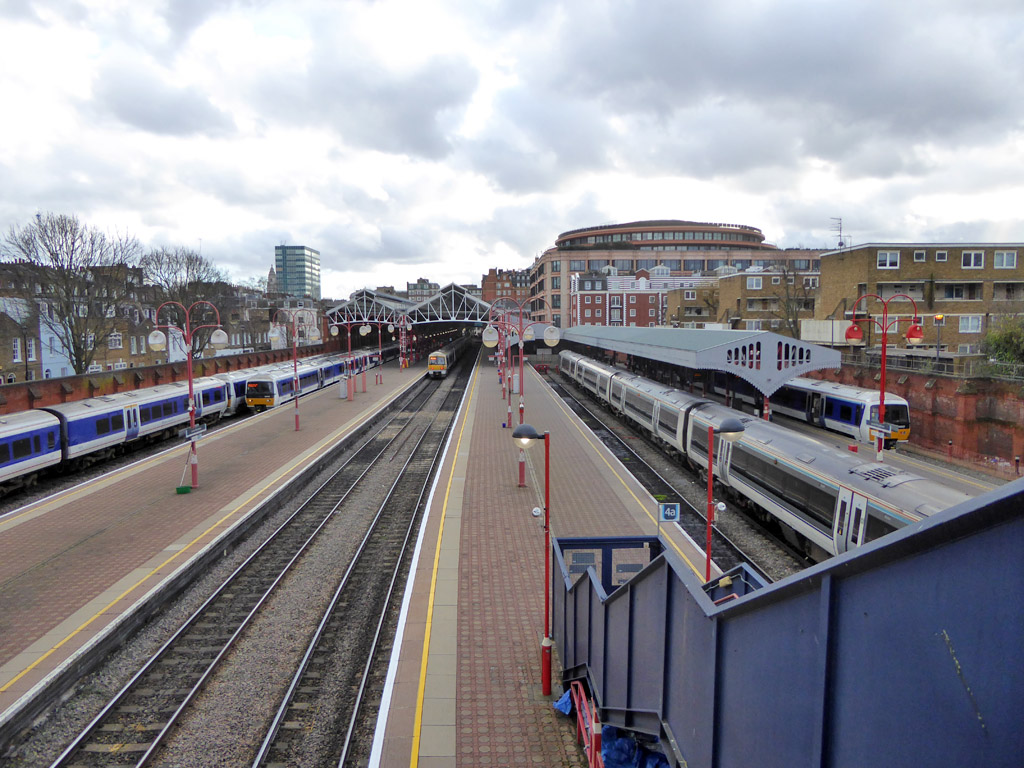
Overview of platforms; from left to right, platforms 1–6

The typical off-peak weekday service pattern from Marylebone is:

- 1 train per hour to Birmingham Moor Street
- 1 train per hour to Banbury, with 1 train per 2 hours extending to Birmingham Snow Hill
- 2 trains per hour to Oxford
- 1 train per hour to High Wycombe (stopping)
- 2 trains per hour to Aylesbury via Amersham, one of which continues to Aylesbury Vale Parkway (stopping)

Additional services run in the peak hours and some Birmingham trains extend to Stourbridge Junction.

Preceding station	National Rail	Following station
Terminus	Chiltern Railways Chiltern Main Line; London–Birmingham	High Wycombe
Terminus	Chiltern Railways Chiltern Main Line; London–Birmingham	Bicester North
Terminus	Chiltern Railways London–Oxford	Gerrards Cross
Terminus	Chiltern Railways London–Oxford	Wembley Stadium
Terminus	Chiltern Railways Chiltern Main Line; Stopping service	Wembley Stadium
Terminus	Chiltern Railways London–Aylesbury	Harrow-on-the-Hill
Terminus	Chiltern Railways London–Aylesbury	Amersham
	Historical railways	
Terminus	Great Central Railway; Great Central Main Line	Harrow-on-the-Hill; Line and station open
Terminus	Great Central Railway; Great Western and Great Central Joint Railway	Wembley Stadium; Line and station open
Terminus	London & North Eastern Railway; Wembley Exhibition Loop	Wembley Exhibition; Line and station closed

=== Station facilities ===
The station opened with a dining restaurant and a buffet. The restaurant was changed to a self-service operation when British Rail took over in 1948. The Victoria and Albert bar opened on 14 December 1971. In the 21st century, the concourse contains a small selection of shops.

=== Accidents ===
On 28 March 1913, a train leaving for High Wycombe collided with another arriving from Leicester, killing one passenger and injuring 23 people on the incoming train. The cause was blamed on the intermediate starter signal being lowered before the main starter was ready; the view of the latter was obscured by the smoke.

On 11 December 2015, a train pulling into the station caught fire, causing it to be evacuated. The cause was believed to be a fault in its air conditioning unit.

== London Underground ==
Marylebone
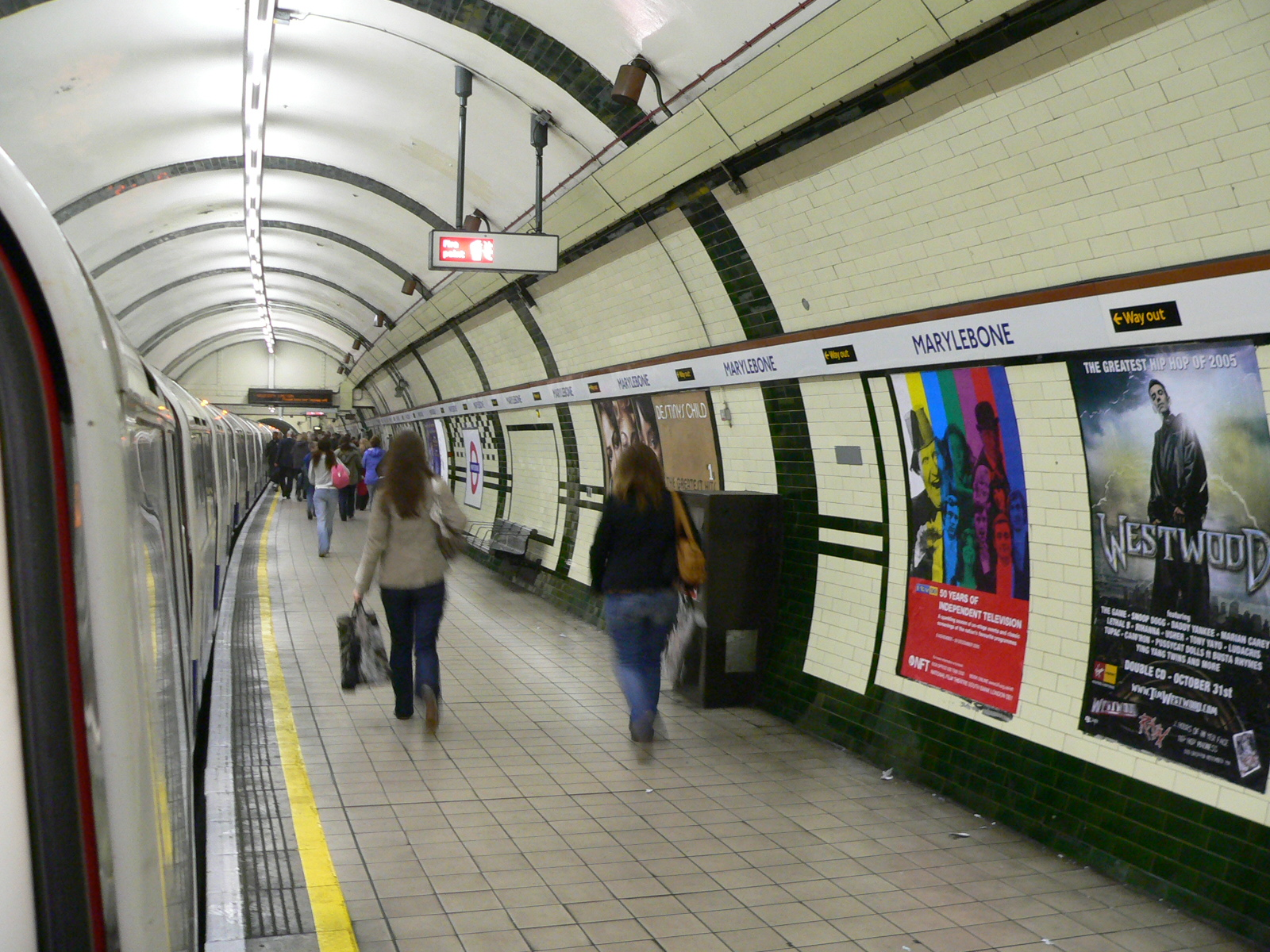
- Bakerloo line northbound platform at the London Underground station
- Interactive map of Marylebone

General information
- Location: Marylebone
- Local authority: City of Westminster
- Managed by: London Underground
- Number of platforms: 2
- Fare zone: 1
- OSI: Marylebone

London Underground annual entry and exit
- 2021: ▲4.60 million
- 2022: ▲8.72 million
- 2023: ▼8.22 million
- 2024: ▲8.49 million
- 2025: ▼8.33 million

Key dates
- 1907: Service extended (BS&WR)

Other information
- External links: TfL station info page
- Coordinates: 51.52222°N 0.16306°W

On the London Underground, Marylebone is on the Bakerloo line between Edgware Road and Baker Street stations, along with its mainline station above. It is situated in London fare zone 1. Access is via escalators from the main line station concourse, which houses the Underground station's ticket office. Until 2004, a wooden escalator led into the station, one of the last on the London Underground system that had not been replaced as a consequence of the King's Cross fire in 1987.

Marylebone has direct connections with just a single Tube line, unlike many other London termini such as Euston and Paddington. There is no direct interchange with the Circle line, which predates the station by more than 30 years and bypasses it to the south. The nearest stations on the Circle line are Edgware Road and Baker Street 550 metres (1,800 ft) away.

=== History ===
The underground station was opened on 27 March 1907 by the Baker Street and Waterloo Railway under the name Great Central, following a change from its intended name Lisson Grove. The railway terminated here until the extension to Edgware Road opened on 15 June. The station was renamed Marylebone on 15 April 1917. The original name still appears in places on the platform wall tiling, although the tiling scheme is a replacement designed to reflect the original scheme.

The present entrance opened on 1 February 1943, following wartime damage to the original station building that stood to the west at the junction of Harewood Avenue and Harewood Row, and after the introduction of the escalators. The old building, designed by the Underground Electric Railways Company of London's architect, Leslie Green, used lifts to access the platforms. It was demolished in 1971 and the site is occupied by a budget hotel.

In August 2020, work began to install a third escalator in place of the present staircase, followed by replacement of the 1943 built escalators. The work is expected to be completed in 2023.

=== Services ===
The weekday off-peak and Sunday service on the London Underground (Bakerloo line) consists of:

- 16 tph southbound to Elephant & Castle
- 8 tph northbound to Queen's Park
- 4 tph northbound to Stonebridge Park
- 4 tph northbound to Harrow & Wealdstone

Preceding station	London Underground	Following station
Edgware Road towards Harrow & Wealdstone	Bakerloo line	Baker Street towards Elephant & Castle

== Cultural references ==
As one of the quietest London termini, Marylebone has been popular as a filming location. In particular, several scenes in The Beatles' film A Hard Day's Night were filmed there in April 1964, as was the opening scene of the 1965 film of The IPCRESS File and the 1978 film of The Thirty-Nine Steps (standing in for St Pancras). The plague outbreak scenes in the 1970 Doctor Who serial Doctor Who and the Silurians were filmed at Marylebone in November 1969. The station continues to be used as an occasional filming location up to the present day, according to Film London.

Marylebone is one of four London termini depicted on the British version of the Monopoly board game, along with King's Cross, Fenchurch Street and Liverpool Street. During the time the board was designed in the mid-1930s, all the stations were being operated by the LNER.

== See also ==
- The Landmark London – the present name of the former Great Central Hotel
